= Jisi Incident =

Military conflict between the Later Jin dynasty and the Ming dynasty

- Part of the Ming-Qing transition
Date	Winter 1629 – Summer 1630
Location	Hebei, Beijing, China
Result	Later Jin victory

Belligerents
Later Jin	Ming dynasty

Commanders and leaders
Hong Taiji; Ajige; Dorgon; Dodo; Hooge; Manggūltai; Abatai; Amin; Jirgalang; Yoto; Sahaliyan	Yuan Chonghuan; Man Gui †; Zu Dashou; Zhao Shuaijiao †; Sun Zushou †; Liu Zhilun †; Hou Shilu; You Shiwei; Hei Yunlong (POW); Ma Dengyun (POW); Ma Shilong; Sun Chengzong; Qin Liangyu; Cao Wenzhao

Strength
More than 100,000	Unknown

Casualties and losses
Unknown, but heavy	Unknown, but heavy

The Jisi Incident (simplified Chinese: 己巳之变; traditional Chinese: 己巳之變) was a military conflict between the Later Jin dynasty and the Ming dynasty, named because it happened in 1629, a jisi year according to the Chinese sexagenary cycle. In the winter of 1629 Hong Taiji bypassed Ming's northeastern defenses by breaching the Great Wall of China west of the Shanhai Pass and reached the outskirts of Beijing before being repelled by reinforcements from Shanhai Pass. The Later Jin secured large amounts of war material by looting the region around Beijing. This was the first time Later Jin forces had broken through the Great Wall since they rose up against the Ming dynasty.

== Course of battle ==
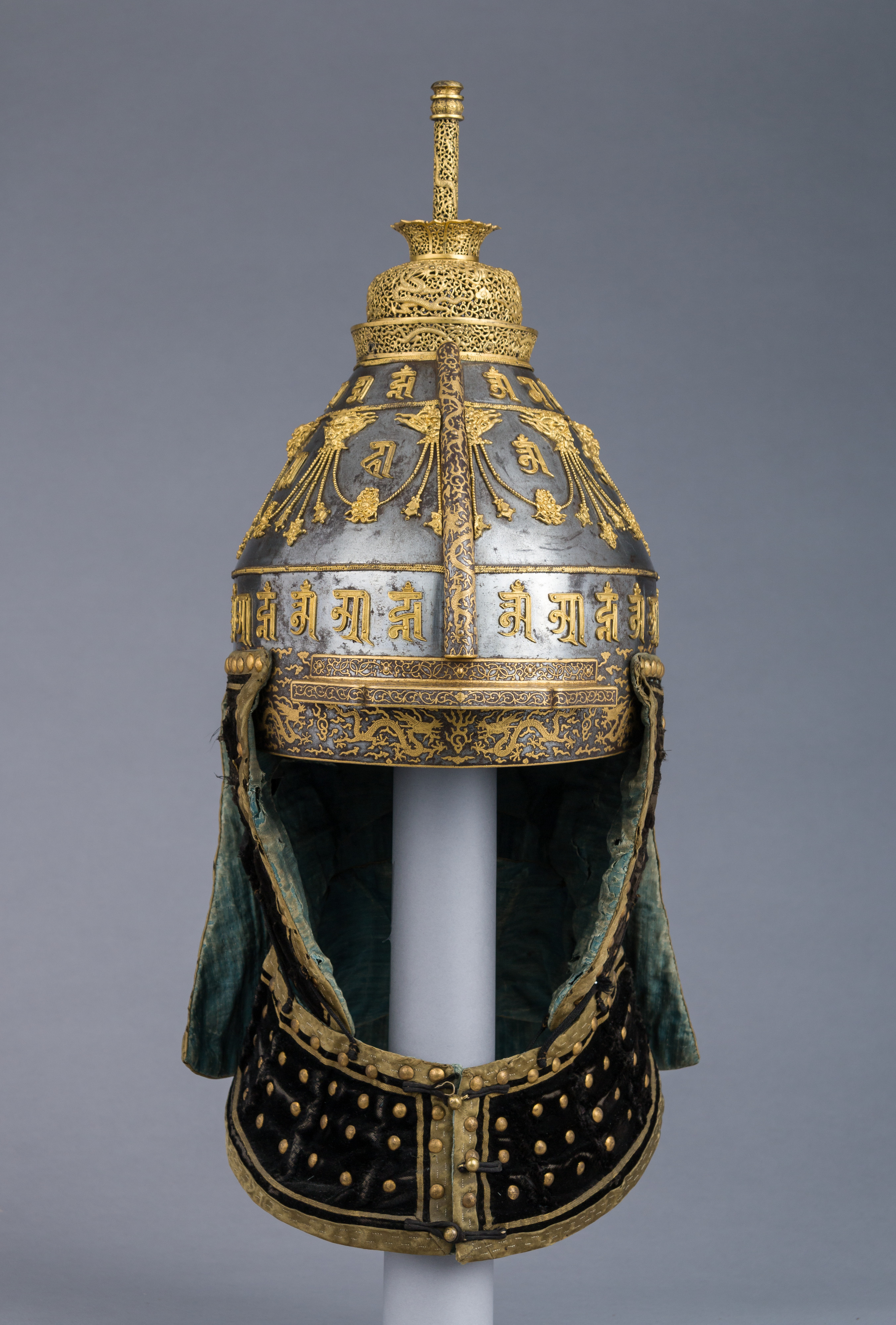
Qing ceremonial helmet

In the winter of 1629 the Jin army broke through the Great Wall at Longjing Pass and Da'an Pass, west of Shanhai Pass. The Jin first secured Jizhou by encircling it and then advanced towards Zunhua, which fell easily with the help of defectors. The Ming official Liu Zhilun attempted to thwart the Jin invaders with two units of gunners, but his men mutinied and they died under a volley of arrows. Zhao Shuaijiao also died at Zunhua.

Ming general Man Gui rushed to intercept the Jin army with 5,000 troops, but they were repulsed and driven toward Beijing's Desheng Gate, Man Gui was severely injured in close-quarters combat. Beijing's garrisons tried to support Man Gui with cannon fire, but ended up hitting Man Gui and his troops. Man Gui was forced to retreat into Beijing after losing 40 percent of his men. Another Ming general Hou Shilu attempted to intervene, but his forces were routed. At that point the Chongzhen Emperor started pleading the high officials in the capital to use their own personal funds and horses to supply the army.

As the Jin army was about to assault the northern wall of Beijing, Yuan Chonghuan and Zu Dashou arrived from the northeast with reinforcements and drove back the invaders. After that Yuan was assigned the defense of the Guangqu Gate.

Man Gui's army attempted to fortify the outskirts of Beijing with palisades, but an elite Jin army attacked, crushing his forces, Sun Zushou tried to save Man Gui from Jin encirclement but was injured by an arrow shot in his forehead, in the end both of them died, Man Gui's deputy generals Hei Yunlong and Ma Dengyun were captured by the Jin army. Zu Dashou attempted similar operations, but was also defeated by Jin cavalry and forced to flee east. Another contingent of Ming forces was defeated at the Marco Polo Bridge. More reinforcements were called in from the west, which contributed to the general mayhem as they looted their way to Beijing.

Yongping fell to the Jin in early 1630, and the invaders captured some 22,000 taels as well as large amounts of food supplies. The Jin army attempted to advance further but was repulsed by Yuan Chonghuan and his commanders who personally fought against the Jin army at close quarters.

Hong Taiji attempted to negotiate with the Chongzhen Emperor, but his envoys elicited no response. The Jin army retreated to Shenyang in the spring of 1630, but commanders and garrisons were left behind to occupy the cities they had captured.

The Ming managed to retake these cities by mid-spring of 1630.

== Aftermath ==
While the Jin had not managed to capture Beijing, they acquired significant amounts of war booty in the form of taels, grain, supplies, weapons, and captives.

Hong Taiji released accusations through captured eunuchs implicating Yuan Chonghuan of colluding with him. Believing these claims, Chongzhen ordered the arrest and imprisonment of Yuan. Yuan was accused of having fired cannons at Man Gui's troops and injured Man Gui, colluding with the Jin, and executing Mao Wenlong on false charges. He was executed on 22 September 1630.

Banditry in the Ming countryside continued. Hong Chengchou was called in to suppress rebels, but his subordinates, in particular the brothers Cao Wenzhao and Cao Bianjiao were reckless. Soldiers slaughtered rebels as well as civilians alike to turn in heads for rewards. At one point an official even submitted female heads, claiming they were bandits. He was demoted. It was estimated that by 1631 there were roughly 200,000 rebels separated into 36 groups.

Among the rebels that popped up, Zhang Xianzhong and Li Zicheng would play major roles in the fall of the dynasty in the next 15 years.

Zhang Xianzhong was a native of Yan'an, Shaanxi. He was said to be strong, valiant, but also hairy and had a lust for killing. In his official biography, it is said that "if a single day went by and he did not kill someone, then he was really unhappy." Kenneth Swope suggests that he may have been mentally unstable and a psychopath. When his family disowned him for getting into repeated fights with his peers, he joined the army, which sentenced him to death for breaking military law. An officer named Chen Hongfan spared him due to being impressed by his valiance. Zhang Xianzhong then joined the rebellion and followed Ma Shouying, who made him a petty officer and named him the "Yellow Tiger". Eventually hardship struck in the winter of 1631 and Zhang was forced to surrender with Luo Rucai, the first of several times he would do so out of expedience.

Li Zicheng was the second son of Li Shouzhong and hailed from Mizhi, Shaanxi. Li showed an aptitude for horse archery at an early age but was forced to become a shepherd at the age of ten due to poverty. He became an orphan when his mother died three years later. Li joined the army at the age of 16 but later left and entered the postal service in 1626. At some point Li became an outlaw for killing a man he was found in bed with his wife after returning from an extended business trip. He was arrested and jailed until his nephew Li Guo freed him, and together they fled the area. In Gansu, Li Zicheng joined the army again and became a squad commander of 50 men. After taking part in the suppression of the rebel Gao Yingxiang, Li himself became a rebel due to charges of stealing rations.

By 1632 Shaanxi was experiencing mass famine. Food supplies could not be delivered due to heavy snows and banditry spread to Sichuan, Shandong and Shanxi.

== Bibliography ==
- Mote, Frederick W. (1999), Imperial China: 900-1800, Cambridge, MA: Harvard University Press, ISBN 0-674-01212-7
- Swope, Kenneth (2014), The Military Collapse of China's Ming Dynasty, Routledge
- Wakeman, Frederic (1985), The Great Enterprise: The Manchu Reconstruction of Imperial Order in Seventeenth-Century China, vol. 1, University of California Press
