= Late Ming peasant rebellions =

Revolts in China (1628–1644)

- Part of the Ming-Qing transition
- Late Ming peasant rebellions 1628–1636
Date	1628–1644
Location	Shaanxi, Shanxi, Sichuan and Henan
Result	Rebel victory Li Zicheng captures Beijing; End of the Ming dynasty

Belligerents
Various peasant rebels: White Lotus remnants; Shun dynasty; Xi dynasty	Ming dynasty

Commanders and leaders
Wang Jiayin; Wang Er; Gao Yingxiang; Li Zicheng; Lao Huihui; Luo Rucai; Zhang Xianzhong; Li Dingguo; Sun Kewang	Yang He; Hong Chengchou; Chen Qiyu; Lu Xiangsheng; Cao Wenzhao; Cao Bianjiao; Sun Chuanting; Huang Degong; Qin Liangyu; Yang Sichang; Ding Qirui; Fu Zonglong; You Shiwei; Ma Shilong

Strength
600,000+	~100,000

The late Ming peasant rebellions (Chinese: 明末民變) occurred during the last decades of the Ming dynasty lasting from 1628 to 1644. They were primarily caused by natural disasters in Shaanxi, Shanxi, and Henan. The rebels also composed from the followers of Xu Hongru, the leader of the White Lotus Societies who had been executed in 1622.

At the same time, the She-An Rebellion and Later Jin incursions forced the Ming government to cut funding for the postal service, which resulted in the mass unemployment of men in the provinces hit hard by natural disasters. Unable to cope with three major crises at the same time, the Ming dynasty collapsed in 1644.

== Background ==
By 1627, the war with the Later Jin dynasty as well as the eruption of the She-An Rebellion in 1621 had drained Ming treasuries to dangerously low levels, with just seven million taels left in the Taicang Vault.

Furthermore, the Little Ice Age also caused the destruction of Ming's Tuntian or military farm system, thus increased military expenditure and also exarcebate national fiscal crisis. Holistically, the Little Ice Age phenomenon caused temperature in the Central Plains and the rainfall in the northern agricultural and pastoral areas reached their lowest point since the Qin and Han Dynasties. China experienced a period of extremely cold weather from the 1620s until the 1710s. The Ming realm was also suffering from natural disasters in Shaanxi, Shanxi and Henan. In 1627 widespread drought in Shaanxi resulted in mass starvation as harvests failed and people turned to cannibalism. Natural disasters in Shaanxi were not unusual but in the last 60 years of the Ming, they were especially bad, and there was not a single year in which Shaanxi did not experience a natural disaster. The entire region was a natural disaster zone. Shanxi too suffered from windstorms, earthquakes, and famines. In the south, Henan also experienced starvation and it was said that "grains of rice became as precious as pearls." This difficult situation was compounded by the harsh policies of the imperial court.

The Chongzhen Emperor's petty and mercurial ways exacerbated the situation by constantly switching grand secretaries, which prevented a coherent government response from coalescing. Chongzhen's reign alone saw around 50 grand secretaries appointed to the post, representing two-thirds of all holders of that post throughout the entire Ming dynasty.

To prevent further depletion of the imperial treasury, Chongzhen cut funding for the Ming postal service, which saw the mass unemployment of large numbers of men from the central and northern provinces around the Yellow River region. This contributed to the overall deterioration of government control, and the formation of bandit groups which became endemic in the last decades of the Ming.

== Precursor rebellion ==
The uprisings from this period were recorded in some local chronicles recorded that local uprisings emerged. The Sichuan Governor Yin Tonggao once said that "Shaanxi bandits entered Sichuan from Baoning and ravaged Guangyuan and Shenxuan. In the year 1622, Xu Hongru, leader of the White Lotus Societies (Kenneth Swope said Xu Hongru was a Catholic convert) conspired with Yu Hongzhi, a peasant rebels leader from Jingzhou (now Jingxian County, Hebei Province) and a rebel named Zhang Shipei from Caozhou (now Caoxian County, Shandong Province) to launch the uprising on the Mid-Autumn Festival. However, due to the leak of the plan, Xu Hongru revolted three months earlier out of fear of a preemptive action by the government. He declared himself zhongxing fuliedi (lit. Lucky, Devoted lord of the restoration), with regnal title Dacheng Xisheng (Chinese: 大成興勝). The followers of Xu Hongru wore red turban, and launched attacks capturing Yuncheng city, Zou County, Teng County and other places, controlling both sides of the Grand Canal and cutting off the grain transport. The rebel army quickly captured Yuncheng, Zouxian, Tengxian and Yixian, and about 100,000 people submitted and joined them. At the same time, Yu Hongzhi raised troops in Wuyi, Zaoqiang and Hengshui in Hebei Province. Liu Yongming also gathered 20,000 people and soon joined Xu Hongru's rebels alliance. They planned to connect their movements from Xuhuai, Chen, Ying, Qi and Huang in the south, intercept the grain transport in the middle, and finally reach the capital in the north. In November of the same year, Xu Hongru was betrayed by his subordinates, arrested in Zou County, and taken to the capital, where he was executed.

The peasant uprising initiated and led by Xu Hongru lasted for more than half a year and shook Shandong and the imperial court. Although the main force was defeated, the remaining forces continued to fight until August 1624. Due to the severe drought, the peasants in Zou County had no source of income. Hundreds of peasant soldiers gathered in Sizhou and started a struggle against the Ming rulers again. When Li Zicheng rose up to rebel in Mizhi, the so-called "Dongling Fumang" who joined him refers to Xu Hongru's followers and its remnants. Gu Yingta testified that there was a direct line of succession from Xu Hongru to Li Zicheng's uprising is correct. When Li Zicheng marched into Henan. This suggests that the White Lotus Sect members organized by Xu Hongru constituted many from Li Zicheng's followers.

== Rebellion ==
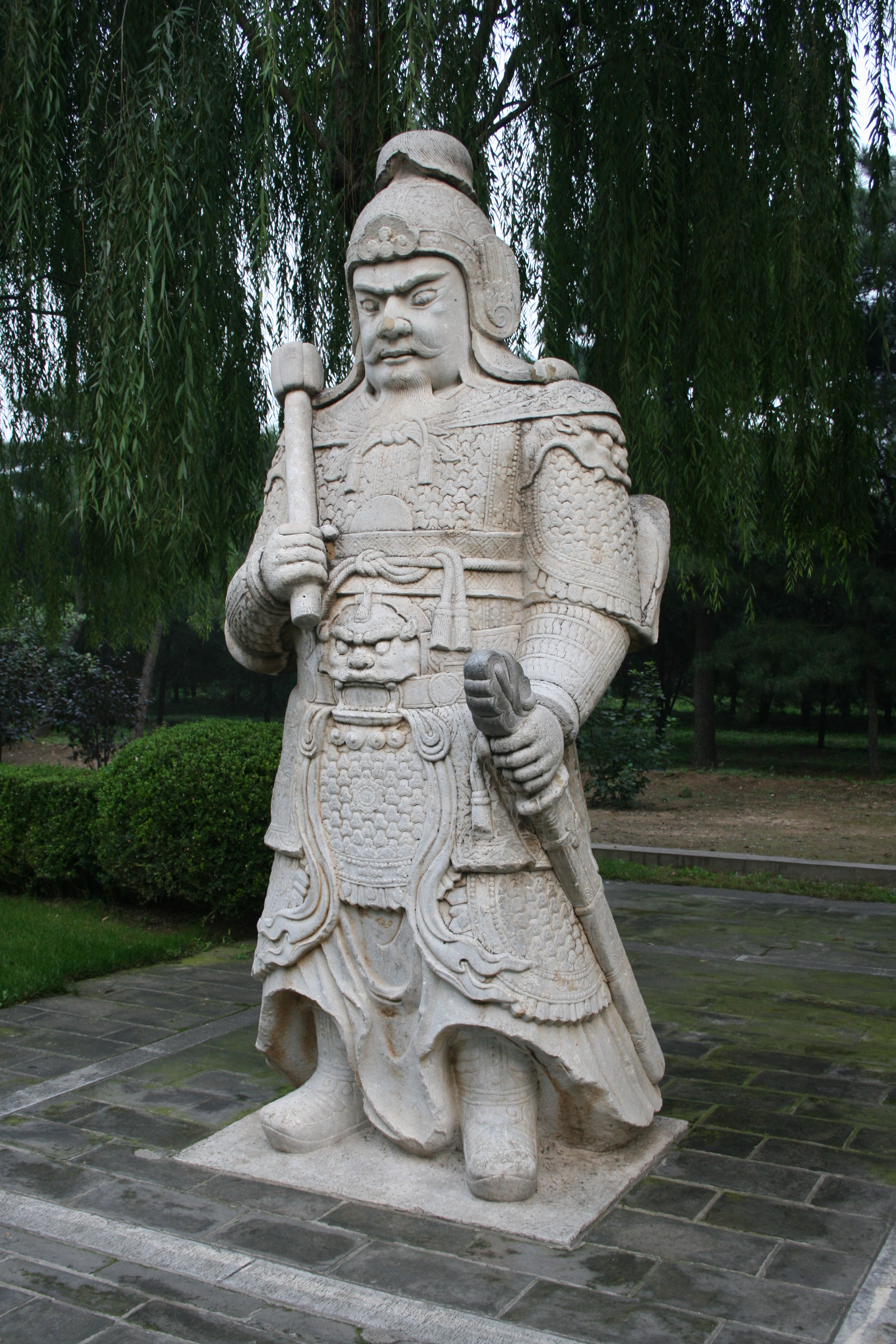
A Ming dynasty tomb guard in mountain pattern armour wielding a mace

During this period of the late Ming dynasty, Confucian values such as "morality" (daoli) and "fairness" (gongli) concepts of virtue started to be used in growing frequency by outlaws and rebels. It was attested by citation from Perry Link, that during the By the end of Ming dynasty period, bandits in Hebei used slogans such as "killing the rich to help the poor" and "carrying out the Dao on behalf of Heaven.", which popularized by both Water Margin and Romance of the Three Kingdoms as a form of "remedial protest".

In the spring of 1628, Wang Jiayin started a revolt in Shaanxi with some 6,000 followers. The rebellion posed no threat to the Ming army, but due to the rugged mountain terrain of Shaanxi, the Ming pacification army of 17,000 was unable to effectively root out the rebels.

Another bandit leader Gao Yingxiang rose up in revolt and joined Wang Jiayin soon after. In early 1629 the veteran anti-rebel leader Yang He was called into service and made Supreme Commander of the Three Border Regions. What he found was that situations were even more dire than they appeared. Salaries for soldiers of Shaanxi were three years in arrears, and their own soldiers were deserting to join the rebels. Yang was unable to suppress Wang Jiayin's rebels, who took several isolated fortresses as late as 1630.

Yang's policy of amnesty for surrendered peasants was generally ineffective. Once surrendered, the peasants would go back to their homes and join other rebel bands. Despite Ming victories in battle, peasant rebellions would remain a major problem for the remainder of the Ming dynasty. Yang He was eventually impeached and arrested for ineffectiveness. He was replaced with Hong Chengchou who would later defect to the Qing dynasty.

His subordinates, in particular the brothers Cao Wenzhao and Cao Bianjiao were reckless. Soldiers slaughtered rebels as well as civilians alike to turn in heads for rewards. At one point an official even submitted female heads, claiming they were bandits. He was demoted. It was estimated that by 1631 there were roughly 200,000 rebels which separated into 36 groups. In April; You Shilu, Cao Wenzhao, and Wei Yunshen led three armies to attack the rebels army led by Wang Jiayin at Hequ. In this campaign, Cao Wenzhao dared not pursue Wang's defeated army. He hurried to Daizhou (present-day Daixian) and Xinzhou (present-day Xin County). Taiyuan was surrounded by peasant armies. Cao Wenzhao intended to defend Taiyuan from the north. However, large numbers of peasant armies were also active in Dai and Xin, engaging Cao Wenzhao's forces in another numerous battles. His forces killed more than 1,500 rebels, and later managed to kill Wang Jiayin during their final confrontation at Yangcheng. According to one source, on June 2, Wang Jiayin was killed by his own men after Cao Wenzhao defeated them. The assassin was reportedly sent by Cao Wenzhao. He planted Wang Jiayin's brother-in-law Zhang Liwei as a spy. Zhang Liwei colluded with Wang Jiayin's wife Zhang and his general Wang Guozhong, and got Wang Jiayin drunk and assassinated him in June of the fourth year of Chongzhen. After the deaths of Wang Jiayin, the rebels elected Wang Ziyi as their new leader.

=== Wang Er ===
In July 1627, a rebel leader named Wang Er launched an uprising in the Guanzhong Plain of Shaanxi Province. He initiated it along with Zhong Guangdao and other peasants from Bai Shui,

After Wang Er and others revolted, they captured Yijun County, released the prisoners, and then went north to join Wang Jiayin. Their numbers reached five or six thousand, and they gathered in Huanglong Mountain in Yan'an and Qingyang. Soon after, they were defeated by Hong Chengchou, the Ming Dynasty's Shaanxi Grain Commissioner, and retreated into the valley. Gao Yingxiang, a native of Ansai, led a revolt in the first year of Chongzhen's reign and led a force to join Wang Jiayin.

=== Zhang Xianzhong ===
Zhang Xianzhong was a native of Yan'an, Shaanxi. He was said to be strong, valiant, but also hairy and had a lust for killing. In his official biography, it is said that "if a single day went by and he did not kill someone, then he was really unhappy." When his family disowned him for getting into repeated fights with his peers, he joined the army, which sentenced him to death for breaking military law.

An officer named Chen Hongfan spared him due to being impressed by his valiance. Zhang Xianzhong then joined the rebellion and followed Ma Shouying, who made him a petty officer and named him the "Yellow Tiger". Eventually hardship struck in the winter of 1631 and Zhang was forced to surrender with Luo Rucai, the first of several times he would do so out of expedience.

In 1647, adoptive sons of Zhang Xianzhong; Sun Kewang, Li Dingguo and others, declared themselves kings, with Sun Kewang became the overall ruler of the land.

=== Li Zicheng ===
Li Zicheng was the second son of Li Shouzhong and hailed from Mizhi, Shaanxi. Li showed an aptitude for horse archery at an early age but was forced to become a shepherd at the age of ten due to poverty. He became an orphan when his mother died three years later. Li joined the army at the age of 16 but later left and entered the postal service in 1626.

At some point Li became an outlaw for killing a man he found in bed with his wife after returning from an extended business trip. He was arrested and jailed until his nephew Li Guo freed him, and together they fled the area. In Gansu, Li Zicheng joined the army again and became a squad commander of 50 men. After taking part in the suppression of the rebel Gao Yingxiang, Li became a rebel due to charges of stealing rations.

Li Zicheng rebels group's call for the"equalization of land" (jun tian) are thought to be proto-socialism aspiration from the peasant class during Ming dynasty, decries the lands possession By Land lord and gentry class. According to historian Roland Mousnier. Li Zicheng's rebels group, which composed of salt smugglers, convoymen, and professional soldiers, at first were feared by ordinary peasants just like the Écorcheurs bandits which active during Hundred Years' War in France".

=== Rebel movements ===
By 1633, the rebels had spread into Huguang, Sichuan, Shanxi. Chen Qiyu was made Supreme Commander of Shaanxi, Shanxi, Henan, Huguang, and Sichuan. He drove out Zhang Xianzhong and Luo Rucai from Sichuan. The rebels in Henan were driven west until they were bottled up in the southwestern corner of Henan in Chexiang Gorge. Heavy rains battered the rebels for 40 days. After weeks of deprivation, 13,000 rebels, including Li Zicheng, surrendered to Chen Qiyu. They were returned to their homes under supervision. When 36 rebels were killed and their heads hung up on the city walls, a full-scale revolt broke out again.

Li Zicheng besieged Longzhou but was driven away by Zuo Guangxian. Despite the inability of the rebels to take well-defended cities, the Ming army was also unable to decisively defeat them, so the Ming started building blockhouses in towns to fortify the countryside. In 1635, a meeting between major rebel groups took place at Rongyang in Central Henan. Zhang Xianzhong and Gao Yingxiang were tasked with taking Southern Zhili, Luo Rucai with defending the Yellow River, and Ma Shouying with leading the mobile division.

Zhang and Gao sacked Fengyang, the ancestral home of the Hongwu Emperor and the location of his tomb. Over 4,000 Ming officials were killed and 2,600 structures were burned down. During the operation, a dispute occurred between Li Zicheng and Zhang Xianzhong on whether or not to kill the eunuchs, which led to the dissolution of the rebel alliance. They split up with Li moving west and Zhang to the east.

Zhang Xianzhong failed to take the city of Luzhou, which was heavily defended with cannons that dealt heavy casualties to the rebels, killing 1,100. Li Zicheng continued his rebel activity throughout 1635 and 1636 with modest success. However, his lieutenant defected to the Ming and took Li's girlfriend along with him. Li lost Xianyang to the Ming after that. To the north, a 43,000 strong Ming army arrived in Henan under the command of Hong Chengchou. He failed to rout the rebels and suffered a defeat. Lu Xiangsheng was put in charge of rebel pacification in Huguang. Meanwhile, the Ming suffered a major defeat when rebel forces surrounded Cao Wenzhao, when he overextended and ran into rebel cavalry forces. Cao killed himself.

In 1635, the rebel forces felt that only by fighting together could they be strong. The various rebel factions met in Xingyang, Henan, totaling 13 clans and 72 camps, and discussed strategies to fight the enemy. Li Zicheng in paricular brought about 70–80,000 followers.

By 1636, the rebels had become better organized and had heavy cannons Gao Yingxiang moved towards Taozhou and crushed a Ming army on his way to Nanjing. Gao was then defeated in a series of battles against Lu Xiangsheng but escaped. Lu was unable to follow up on his victories and he was called back to the northern frontier to deal with the Qing dynasty's invasion. Sun Chuanting was made Grand Coordinator of Shaanxi. Sun captured Gao Yingxiang when he invaded Shaanxi and sent him to Beijing where he was dismembered. His followers joined other rebel leaders such as Li Zicheng and Lao Huihui.

The rebel situation deteriorated even further as the Chongzhen Emperor raised taxes in 1637 to fund the military. A new Vice Minister of War, Xiong Wencan, was put in charge of overall rebel pacification activities, but Hong Chengchou and Zuo Liangyu basically ignored all his orders. Hong defeated Li Zicheng in Sichuan, but victory in battle meant little against the rebel forces, and sometimes the army looted and raped in the area evicted of rebels. Ming forces continued to score victories against Li Zicheng and Zhang Xianzhong without being able to kill or capture them. At one point Zhang Xianzhong surrendered and was awarded troops and supplies on the promise that he would fight against Li Zicheng.

Throughout 1638 and 1639, earthquakes rattled Sichuan and locusts ravaged Suzhou. The rebel movement gained momentum as more refugees joined them to increase their odds of survival. Li Zicheng kept losing battles and fled into the mountains. Luo Rucai surrendered to the Ming. It appeared for a time that ultimate victory was within grasp for the Ming forces. The Qing invaded again in 1638, exacerbating the Ming's already depleted resources.

In 1639, Zhang Xianzhong rebelled again after having recuperated in Gucheng. He opened the prisons of Gucheng and killed the local officials. Joining forces, Zhang and Luo attacked the nearby town of Fangxian and then moved towards the heavily forested mountains of the Shaanxi border. Zuo Liangyu was sent against the renewed rebellion. He was ambushed near Mount Luoying and suffered 10,000 losses. Xiong Wencan was impeached and replaced by Yang Sichang.

Although Yang Sichang and Zuo Liangyu clashed on policy, they scored a number of victories against the rebels from 1639 to 1640. It appeared once again that the Ming were turning the tide. Zuo inflicted a major defeat on Zhang Xianzhong near Mount Manao, killing 3,500 and capturing several commanders. Zhang escaped to western Sichuan. Yang became wary of Zuo's successes and tried to promote another general, He Renlong, as his equal. When that didn't work, both generals were alienated. By the winter of 1640, Sichuan was being ravaged by Zhang Xianzhong, and Ming forces were deserting on a daily basis. Yang requested to be relieved from his post. The Chongzhen Emperor refused and instead sent him more funds for medicine and famine relief.

== Fall of Ming ==
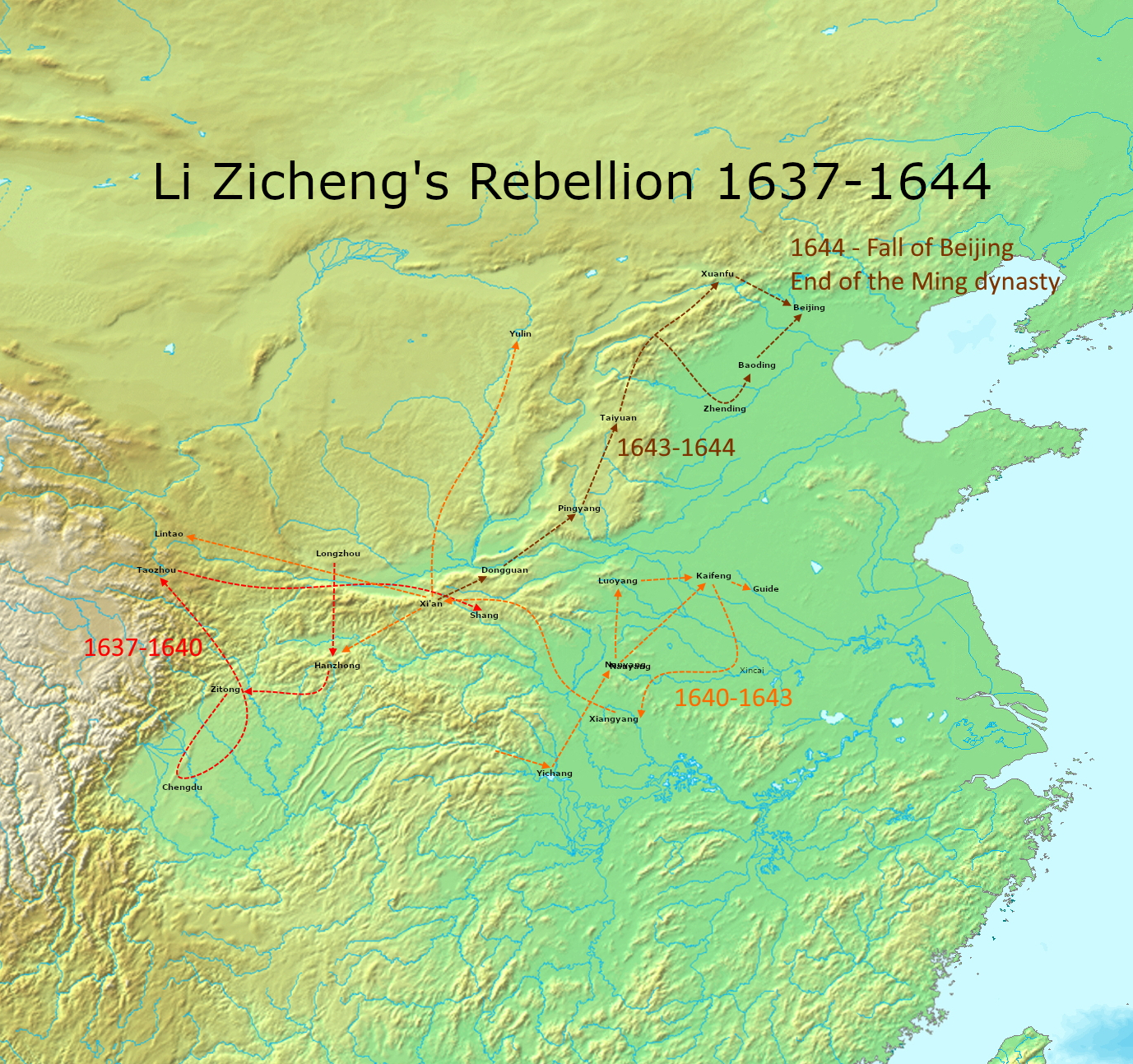
Li Zicheng's rebellion 1637–1644

Kill your oxen and sheep
And prepare your wine and spirits
Open your gates and welcome the Dashing Prince
When the Dashing Prince comes
You won’t be paying taxes

— Li Zicheng

In 1641, Zhang Xianzhong captured Xiangyang and Li Zicheng captured Luoyang. Li soon lost Luoyang to Ming forces but he was recognized by then as the foremost rebel leader. With his large following he besieged Kaifeng. Upon hearing this, Yang Sichang stopped eating and died in spring. He was replaced by Ding Qirui. Meanwhile, Zhang Xianzhong was beaten back and forced to move west from Yunyang. Even as the Ming armies collapsed from 1641 to 1644, they were still scoring local victories over the rebels.

Ding Qirui was unable to control his starving men who looted the towns they crossed. Some simply deserted to scrounge for food. Ding was impeached and replaced by Fu Zonglong. Zhang Xianzhong's army had swelled upward of 100,000 but he was unable to score any major victories against Ming forces except in the taking of cities in Sichuan, which they slaughtered. Luo Rucai left Zhang and joined Li Zicheng. Li captured both Xincai and Nanyang, and in the process killed Fu Zonglong and Meng Ruhu. He Renlong was executed for being suspected of aiding the rebels.

In 1642, Xiangcheng, Shucheng, Runing, Xiangyang, De'an, and Chengtian all fell to Li Zicheng. Zhang Xianzhong took Luzhou. Li's siege of Kaifeng went badly as he tried again and again to take the heavily defended city. During one attack, he lost an eye to an arrow. The city was taken on 7 October 1642, by diverting a river and flooding the city, killing 270,000 people. The rebels looted whatever was left of the city and retreated.

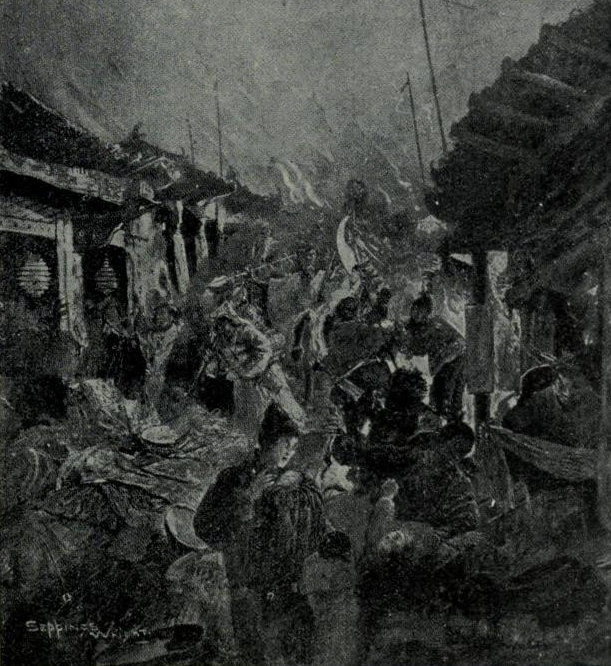
A 20th-century illustration of the Li's army looting Beijing.

By 1643, the rebels had coalesced into two major factions in Li Zicheng in Central China and Zhang Xianzhong in Sichuan. Li declared himself Prince of Shun. Zhang declared himself Prince of the Xi. Wuchang, Hanyang, and Changsha fell to Zhang, who declared the formation of the Xi dynasty. Li felt threatened by Zhang's growing success so he put a bounty on his head. Li consolidated power within his own faction by eliminating Luo Rucai and other local bandits. In the autumn, the Chongzhen Emperor ordered Sun Chuanting to attack Li. This turned out to be the last Ming offensive as the Ming army was completely destroyed and Sun killed in battle. Li followed up the victory by capturing Xi'an, which surrendered without a fight.

=== Fall of Li Zicheng ===
In 1644, Li Zicheng declared the formation of the Shun dynasty. In Beijing, Chongzhen made a last-ditch effort to raise an army from the civilian population and sent them out against Li. More than half the army deserted before they were 100 li away from Beijing. Li advanced on the Ming capital in two directions, taking Taiyuan, Datong, and Changping in the process.

On 24 April, one of Chongzhen's eunuchs ordered the gates to be opened for the rebels, but the guards refused. The defense shot off their cannons in a large show of force, but they had no ammunition. When the rebels realized that only powder was being fired, they attacked in force and took the city gates in a brief struggle. The Chongzhen Emperor ordered the imperial family to commit suicide. Before hanging himself, Chongzhen cut off the arm of one of the princesses who could not bring themselves to suicide. She was still alive the next day when the rebels found her.

Li Zicheng's victory was short-lived. The next month the northern general Wu Sangui defected to the Qing Dynasty. It was said when Li Yan asked Liu Zongmin to stop punishing those who voiced complaints about rebel misconduct, Liu rejected the request and countered by accusing Li Yan of persistently criticizing fellow rebel leaders, including Li Zicheng. Upon hearing from Li Mou that Wu Sangui was still undecided about the Manchus, Li Yan suggested dispatching Wu's father, Wu Xiang, and his concubine Chen Yuanyuan to sway him, but Niu Jinxing rejected the plan, arguing that Wu was already determined to crush the rebels and that Li Yan's motive was simply to expel Liu's forces from the city. As popular backing for the rebels eroded, Niu Jinxing and Li Zicheng faulted Li Yan for having no viable strategy of his own, with Niu persuading Li Zicheng that Li Yan was blaming him for the dwindling support—at which point Li Zicheng first resolved that Li Yan had to be killed. Later, the combined forces of Wu Sangui and the Qing defeated Li's army at the Battle of Shanhai Pass. Li's Shun dynasty was dismantled the following year, with Li disappearing in the chaos.

=== Death of Zhang Xianzhong ===
In January 1647, Zhang and the Qing forces met in Xichong where Zhang had set up camp, and he was killed in the confrontation. According to one account, he was betrayed by one of his officers, a native of Sichuan named Liu Chin-chung (Liu Jinzhong) who resented his policy of terror in Sichuan. Zhang was alerted to their presence and decided to confront them with only 8-10 men. Liu pointed Zhang out to the Qing when Zhang rushed out from his tent on learning of the betrayal, and he was then shot and killed by a skilled Manchu archer.

== Historical evaluation ==
Historian Yuan Tingdong believes that the peasant uprising at the end of the Ming Dynasty was the longest, largest, most intense, and most far-reaching peasant uprising in Chinese history.

The tremendous influence of the Water Margin novel on for this uprising also noteworthy. Historian James Bunyan Parsons argues that Water Margin may have had some influence on Zhang Xianzhong's rebellion. Based on Parsons' hypothesis, Mark R. E. Meulenbeld points out that Zhang Xianzhong was recorded using the novels as a source for emulation, as he quoted an early Qing observer who ascribes Zhang's fondness with the novel, "The shrewdness of Zhang Xianzhong included him making people read books like Three Kingdoms and Water Margin every day..."

== Bibliography ==
- Swope, Kenneth (2014), The Military Collapse of China's Ming Dynasty, Routledge
- Wakeman, Frederic (1985), The Great Enterprise: The Manchu Reconstruction of Imperial Order in Seventeenth-Century China, vol. 1, University of California Press
