= Great Plague in the late Ming dynasty =

Disease outbreak in China

- Disease: Plague
- Pathogen: Yersinia pestis
- Location: China
- First outbreak: Shanxi
- Index case: 1633
- Deaths: 200,000+ (only in Beijing)

The Great Plague in the late Ming dynasty (Chinese: 明末大鼠疫; pinyin: Míngmò Dàshǔyì), also known as the North China Plague in the late Ming dynasty (明末华北鼠疫; 明末華北鼠疫; Míngmò Huáběi Shǔyì), or the Great Plague of Jingshi (京师大鼠疫; Jīngshī Dàshǔyì), was a major epidemic between 1633 and 1644, the last phase of the Ming dynasty in China, during the Chongzhen Emperor's reign (1627–1644). The epidemic started in Shanxi in 1633 and reached Beijing in 1641, where the plague caused the deaths of more than 200,000 people in 1643, directly contributing to the collapse of the Ming dynasty in 1644.

== History ==
Plague first broke out in Shanxi in 1633, corresponding to the sixth year of the Chongzhen Emperor's reign . In 1641, the plague arrived in Beijing, the Ming capital. At the same time, historical records indicate that more than half of the population in northern Zhejiang fell ill in 1641, and 90% of the local people died in 1642. Such claims are corroborated by other contemporary sources from the region, who described corpses laying openly in the streets resulting in missed harvests due to lack of manpower, further exacerbating the crisis.

In 1643, the epidemic reached its peak, killing more than 200,000 people in Beijing alone, accounting for 20–25% of the local population. The “pimple plague” and “vomit blood plague” recorded in Chinese literature at the time, were possibly bubonic plague and pneumonic plague caused by Yersinia pestis.

In March 1644, Beijing was under siege by Li Zicheng's troops, whereas the defending force in Beijing was weakened significantly due to the plague, with some 50,000 soldiers remaining of the original 100,000. Soon, Li won the Battle of Beijing and the Chongzhen Emperor committed suicide, marking the end of the Ming dynasty, although Li was subsequently defeated in the Battle of Shanhai Pass by the allied forces of the former Ming general Wu Sangui and the Manchu-led Qing dynasty.

Wu Youke (1582–1652) developed the idea that some diseases were caused by transmissible agents, which he called Li Qi (戾气 "violent qi") when he observed various epidemics rage around him between 1641 and 1644. His book Wen Yi Lun (瘟疫论, "Treatise on Pestilence") can be regarded as the first etiological work on warm-pathogen diseases in Chinese medical history.

== See also ==
- Second plague pandemic
- List of epidemics and pandemics
- Shun dynasty
