= Zuo Liangyu =

Ming dynasty general (1599–1645)

Zuo Liangyu (Chinese: 左良玉) (1599–1645) was a Ming dynasty general. He was born in Linqing, Shandong Province.

He started his military career in Liaodong. In 1628, after the Ningyuan mutiny, he was briefly demoted and then reinstated in his post. That same year, he led a successful expedition in Liaodong against the Later Jin. Zuo was eventually transferred to Hunan to fight the nascent peasant rebellions.

== Fighting against the rebels ==
Zuo Liangyu, along with Cao Wenzhao, scored a few victories against the rebels in 1632, but were unable to fully defeat the rebels, who simply left a place when defeated to raid another area. In 1633 he turned back some bandit incursions into Shandong, thanks to his collaboration with Deng Qi.

In 1635, after the sack of Fengyang by rebel forces, Zuo Liangyu managed to defeat a bandit group outside the city of Nanyang. Then, in the last months of the same year, he held Lingbao under repeated assaults by Zhang Xianzhong.

In 1636, government forces scored a notable victory by capturing and executing the renowned bandit leader Gao Jingxiang. However, after his death the bandits continued their activities, with Lao Huihui surrounding and almost killing Zuo Liangyu in one engagement that year.

The next year, Zuo Liangyu and Hong Chengchou managed to score more victories, although they did so while ignoring Xiong Wencan (appointed by the emperor to lead the campaign against the rebels in late 1637). Zuo scored some victories against rebel groups in Sichuan in the early part of the year, and then defeated and killed the bandit Ma Shouying in the summer. In the tenth month he forced Zhang Xianzhong back into Huguang, after the bandit leader unsuccessfully sieged Chengdu for 20 days. Then he defeated Zhang again near Nanyang, in a battle in which the rebel was wounded. After that battle, Zuo was forced by Xiong Wencan to accept a surrender offer by Zhang Xianzhong, who rebelled again in mid 1639.

Xiong Wencai then ordered Zuo Lianygyu to engage Zhang in the Shaanxi border, and he suffered a defeat. The vanguard of his army, under the command of Luo Dai (killed in the fighting), was ambushed by the rebels at Mount Luoying, and lost 10.000 men. For this defeat, Zuo Liangyu was demoted three ranks and was ordered to redeem himself through meritorious service.

In late 1639, Xiong Wencan was impeached and relieved from command, and Yang Sichang began his campaign to end the rebels once and for all, while Zuo Liangyu was invested as "Bandit-Pacifying General". After some victories, Zhang Xianzhong was forced to flee to Sichuan in 1640, hotly pursued by Zuo. Yang Sichang ordered Zuo Liangyu to stop the pursuit and stay defensive, but the general ignored that order. He went on to win a great victory at Mount Manao, killing between 2200-3500 rebels (more were wiped out in follow-up operations by He Renlong), capturing various commanders and Zhang's wives and concubines, and reclaiming many supplies and weapons as loot. Zhang Xianzhong and a few followers barely escaped by rappelling down a mountainside.

In the 5th month of 1641, Zhang Xianzhong and Luo Rucai moved north from Sichuan to relieve pressure on Li Zicheng, who was bottled up for a brief time in the mountains of Shaanxi by He Renlong. Zuo Liangyu intercepted and defeated them at Xishan. Then, after Zhang took Yunyang in the 8th month of 1641, Zuo Liangyu surprised and defeated him east of Yunyang at Xinyang, capturing 10.000 horses and forcing thousands of rebels to surrender. Zhang was wounded again and fled to the mountains under the cover of the night.

After that, Luo Rucai left Zhang Xiangzhong and joined Li Zicheng, and in the 10th month of 1641 they attacked Zuo Liangyu and forced the Ming general to retreat to Yancheng, Henan.

During the third siege of Kaifeng, in June 1642, various commanders, including Zuo, tried to defeat the besiegers under the command of Li Zicheng. The armies clashed at Zhuxianzhen, with the rebels positioned on high ground. Zuo Liangyu and Hu Dawei were to the west of the rebel lines, and Yan Wenyue and Ding Qinrui to the east. The rebel units were able to prevent the four Ming armies from coordinating with each other and managed to sever the Ming supply lines. Yan Wenyue took the worst of the fighting, and initially he gained the advantage. However, when he ran out of ammunition after two days of fighting, his units collapsed. After this, there was a standoff. The Ming armies run out of supplies, and they were reduced to eating their horses and foraging wild plants. On the eleventh day of the standoff, the rebels attacked, and broke the Ming armies, with Zuo Liangyu retreating first.

In early 1643, finding himself outnumbered, Zuo withdrew from Xiangyang, which he was supposed to defend, and in Xiangyang tried to extort the local Ming prince. When the prince refused, Zuo let his men loot the area. After regathering his strength in Jiangxi, Zuo Liangyu's army moved southwest, striking at Zhang Xianzhong. Some of Zuo's subordinates defeated Zhang at Dazi in the 7th month of 1643, and caused 7000 casualties. Zhang Xianzhong fled west, and he lost some more 10.000 men in battle with the pursuing Ming troops. This forced him to abandon the districts between Wuhan and Hanyang that he had taken.

The rest of the fighting against Zhang's forces that year was inconclusive, although the rebel took heavy casualties. Eventually, Zhang moved to Sichuan in 1643, with the objective of establishing his own kingdom there. Also, in late 1643 Zuo ignored Sun Chuanting's order to move from Jiangxi to Runing, to catch Li Zicheng in a pincer in the desperate last Ming offensive against the rebels.

Zuo Liangyu remained at Huguang to pacify the region, which he accomplished to a certain degree, and to shield the Jiangnan region from Zhang Xianzhong's depredations.

== Service under Southern Ming ==
When the Chongzhen Emperor died in 1644, and the Southern Ming court was formed in Nanjing, Zuo Liangyu was persuaded to accept the allegiance of the Hongguang Emperor, although he remained inactive in Huguang and didn't interfere in court politics. Already predisposed to sail down the Yangzi River by strategic considerations, as Shun remnants could sweep down on Huguang fleeing from the Qing, Zuo accepted Hou Fangyu's plea to intervene on behalf of a group of prosecuted scholars against Ma Shiying and Ruan Dacheng. Although Zuo was very ill by that point, his forces started moving towards Nanjing on 19 April, 1645, with a significant amount of initial popular support. His physical condition worsened by the day, and eventually died of internal bleeding in late April, unable to control his men which were already looting along the way. His son inherited his army, and kept moving downstream until he was halted by Southern Ming forces. Finally, on May 13, 1645, his forces surrendered to the Manchu general Ajige at Taiping Prefecture, Anhui Province.
