= Cao Wenzhao =

Ming dynasty general (d. 1635)

Cao Wenzhao 曹文诏

Personal details
- Born: ? Datong, Shanxi
- Died: 1635 Zhenning county, Guizhou

Cao Wenzhao (Chinese: 曹文诏) (?–1635) was a Ming dynasty military general during the Transition from Ming to Qing period. He was active in the suppression of the Late Ming peasant rebellions until his death at the hand of the rebels.

== Early career ==
Cao Wenzhao was a native of Datong city in Shanxi. In his youth, he served in the Liaodong military, successively serving as a sergeant under the military governors Xiong Tingbi (1569–1625) and Sun Chengzong (1563–1638). He later served under General Ma Shilong and was promoted to lieutenant general for his meritorious service.

In 1629, Jisi Incident occurred, as the Jurchen army incursion almost reached Beijing. Hong Chengchou was called in to suppress rebels, but his subordinates, in particular the brothers Cao Wenzhao and Cao Bianjiao were reckless. Soldiers slaughtered rebels as well as civilians alike to turn in heads for rewards. At one point an official even submitted female heads, claiming they were bandits. He was demoted.

In 1630, Cao Wenzhao was appointed deputy commander of the Yansui East Route, leading Lieutenant General Wang Chengyin, Zhang Shujia, and Commander Zuo Liangyu in an ambush at Kushu and Hongqiao in Yutian County, Xinjiang. For his contribution in this operation, he was promoted to Lieutenant General. He then moved from Daqian Mountain to the vicinity of Zunhua, where he followed general Ma Shilong and his men in capturing Da'an City and the Niuyu Pass. For his achievements in recaptured the four cities, the court further promoted him to Deputy Commander-in-Chief. In July, the uprising in Shaanxi was on the rise, and Cao Wenzhao was appointed deputy commander of the Yansui East Route, leading the Guanning Army into the pass to suppress it.

== Peasant rebels suppression ==
Map of the 17th century Late Ming peasant rebellions, where Cao Wenzhao involved heavily in its suppressiom

In 1631, the Late Ming peasant rebels broke again. This time, it was estimated that the rebels were composed to roughly 200,000 men which separated into 36 groups. In April; You Shilu, Cao Wenzhao, and Wei Yunshen, led three armies to attack the rebels army led by Wang Jiayin at Hequ. In this campaign, Cao Wenzhao did not dare to pursue Wang's defeated army, as he instead immediately departed to Daizhou (present-day Daixian) and Xinzhou (present-day Xin County). Taiyuan was surrounded by peasant armies. Cao Wenzhao intended to defend Taiyuan from the north. However, large numbers of peasant armies were also active in Dai and Xin, engaging Cao Wenzhao's forces in another numerous battles. His forces killed more than 1,500 rebels, and later managed to kill Wang Jiayin during their final confrontation at Yangcheng. According to one source, in June 2, Wang Jiayin was killed by his own men after Cao Wenzhao defeated them. The assassin was reportedly sent by Cao Wenzhao. He planted Wang Jiayin's brother-in-law Zhang Liwei as a spy. Zhang Liwei colluded with Wang Jiayin's wife Zhang and his general Wang Guozhong, and got Wang Jiayin drunk and assassinated him in June of the fourth year of Chongzhen. After the deaths of Wang Jiayin, the rebels elected Wang Ziyi as their new leader.

Later, Cao Wenzhao and other generals continues to defeat the rebels repeatedly and forcing them to flee northeast. In this campaign, the combined forces of the governor-general and the four garrisons pursued them relentlessly for half a month, engaging in dozens of battles. The rebels ultimately defeated and fled into the mountains and valleys and not disturbed within a thousand miles of Yan'an and Qingyang for a mean time.

=== Guanzhong suppression ===
In 1632, Cao Wenzhao and Yang Jiamo followed and defeated the rebels again. Soon after, Cao Wenzhao, Yang Jiamo, and Yang Qi, the General of Guyuan, and He Huchen, the General of Ningxia, defeated the rebels at Husi'ao in Ganquan. Cao Wenzhao routed rebels at Xihao, killing more than 1,000 and capturing Du San and Yang Laochai. Remnants joined others to raid Wu'an Prison, seize Huating, and threaten Zhuanglang. Cao Wenzhao and Zhang Jiamo crushed the rebels at Zhangma Village and driven the remnants to flee to the mountains. Cao Bianjiao, Feng Ju, Liu Chenggong, and Ping An pursued and scattered them, while reinforcements under Wang Xingshan, Li Hongsi, and Mo Yujing killed more 520 rebels. Ming forces triumphed at Xianning Pass, Guanshang, Long'an, and beyond—blocking 1,000s with Zhao Guangyuan and routing a Qingshui force via Jiang Yiyang (capturing Li Gongyong). Cao Wenzhao's followed suit by launching espionage opetation which caused fratricide among the rebel leaders, followed by a Shuiluo City assault. The rebels at Tangmao Mountain at Jingning then annihilated by Cao Bianjiao. After Wang Cheng'en victory, the rebels under Man Tianfei, Hao Lin'an, Liu Daojiang, Du Xinglang, and Li Dusi retreated to Tiejiaocheng and besieged Heshui. Cao Wenzhao responded to this by leading his troops to relieve the city, ambushing the rebels at Namwon with 1,000 cavalry bait by faking his own death amid 10,000 enemy's encirclement. The remnants of the rebels fled to Tongchuan Bridge, only to be crushed by the pursuing forces led by Cao Wenzhao, his brother Bianjiao, Feng Ju, Zhang Jiamo, and Fang Maogong. Cao Wenzhao, He Huchen, and Yang Qi won at Husi'ao and Ganquan, while Hong Chengchou killed Man Tianfei in Pingliang, subduing Bai Guangen. Cao Wenzhao went further pursued the retreating rebels through Longzhou, Pingliang, and Fengxiang, securing three October victories. At Mountain Yaozhou, the rebel soldiers killed their own leaders, Du Xinglang and Hao Lin'an, yielding mass surrenders from the rebels. In a memorial submitted to the court, the provincial governor and imperial censor Fan Fucui listed more than 36,600 heads captured in battles, with Cao Wenzhao being ranked first, Zhang Jiamo second, and Wang Chengen and Yang Qi third. When Wenzhao was in Shaanxi, he participated in dozens of battles, making the most contributions, but Hong Chengchou did not give him any credit. The provincial censor Wu Shengsheng highly praised Wenzhao, and Fucui also submitted a memorial to the court, but the Ministry of War still downplayed his achievements and ultimately did not reward Cao Wenzhao. The suppression campaign by Cao Wenzhao and Zuo Liangyu which undergoes until the autumn was largely successful. However, the rebellions kept spreading.

Between 1632 and 1633 CE; Cao Wenzhao, Hong Chengchou, and other Ming generals continues to push the rebels in Shaanxi, until the end of the year they finally surrounded the main force of the rebels army in a narrow area between the Taihang Mountains and the Yellow River in northern Henan.

At some point of his career, Cao Wenzhao was impeached From his position, after Imperial censor Liu Lingyu accused him for being inefficient during operation, uncooperative conducts with other generals, being arrogant, and lied about his own military achievements. Cao Wenzhao was soon dismissed from his post for investigation. After interrogation, he was ordered to relocate to Datong with the rank of general, while military power was handed over to Li Bei, the deputy general of Gushan. Within two months, two counties around Datong were lost, and Cao Wenzhao was sentenced to exile.

=== Shaanxi suppression ===
In the first month of 1633, Cao Wenzhao arrived in Huozhou and defeated the peasant army at Fenhe and Yuxian. He then pursued the enemy to Shouyang. Governor Xu Dingchen dispatched his advisor Zhang Zai to engage the peasant army in advance of the main army's arrival, frightening them into retreat. In February, Cao Wenzhao pursued them and killed their leader, Hunshi Wang, at Bixia Village. The remaining peasants, driven away by Meng Ruhu, met Cao Wenzhao's forces at Fangshan and were defeated again. The peasant armies in Wutai, Yuxian, Dingxiang, and Shouyang were pacified. Xu Dingchen ordered Cao Wenzhao to station his troops in Pingding to defend the eastern part of Taiyuan, and ordered Zhang Yingchang to station his troops in Fenzhou to defend the western part. However, his troops were defeated at Mingqianyi. Cao Wenzhao subsequently defeated the rebels army in Taigu, Fancun, and Yushe, virtually wiping out the Taiyuan peasant army. Due to Cao Wenzhao's extraordinary contributions to the pacification campaign, the emperor issued a special decree to all parts of Shanxi, urging them to store up food and fodder to supply Cao Wenzhao wherever he passed through. Upon learning that some areas not only withheld food and fodder from Cao Wenzhao's troops but also somewhat deliberately used artillery to injure Cao Wenzhao's soldiers, he issued a strict order directing the Imperial censors to investigate and impose severe penalties.

In 1634 Cao Wenzhao, together with Hong Chengchou, and He Renlong (zh:賀人龍), fought against rebel leader Li Zicheng and Zhang Xianzhong. In July, the Qing dynasty army entered the Great Wall to march westward to Chahar. On their return, they casually entered Datong and captured Desheng Fort. Lieutenant General Li Quan committed suicide, leading to the siege of Huairen County, Jingping Fort, Yingzhou, and other areas. Cao Wenzhao and Governor-General Zhang Zongheng initially stationed in Huairen to defend the city. In August, after the siege was lifted, they moved their troops to Zhencheng in order to resist Qing army. However, they were defeated in Datong, followed by Lingqiu and most other forts where troops were stationed fell, and the Qing army returned victorious. In November, the court convicting Cao Wenzhao, Zhang Zongheng, and Governor Hu Zan'en of exile to a border garrison for their failure. Immediately after the order was issued, Shanxi Governor Wu Shengsheng submitted a letter recommending Wenzhao's military expertise and requested that he be transferred to Shanxi. The court then appointed him commander-in-chief of the supporting and suppressing forces, allowing him to atone for his sins through meritorious service. The emperor agreed with the Ministry of War's opinion and ordered Cao Wenzhao to lead his troops to Henan to suppress the bandits. Wu Shengsheng again protested and wrote a letter to Cao Wenzhao, requesting that Cao Wenzhao first pacify the peasant army in Shanxi and then march into Henan. Zhu Youjian did not agree. However, Cao Wenzhao finally took the route to Taiyuan first as gratitude for Wu Shengsheng. In the winter, Cao Wenzhao , Qin Yiming, and Deng Qi rushed to the frontline again. But they only had a few thousand soldiers. They hoped the emperor would mobilize elite troops from Guanning and Tianjin to relieve the threat. The emperor accepted Chang Ziyu's suggestion and asked the Ministry of War to make arrangements. Minister of War Zhang Fengyi, acting on the facts, proposed withdrawing 3,000 troops from the Guan Ning Iron Cavalry troops and 2,000 from Tianjin.

In 1635, he fought against Li Zicheng at Zhengning County. Cao Wenzhao eventually returned to Shanxi and participated in further rebels pacification campaign. Cao Wenzhao's Shanxi troops arrived in Runing on the third day of the third lunar month. Hong Chengchou then ordered his deputy general Liu Chenggong to divide his forces into 2,000 to attack Ciyang. Cao Wenzhao led 3,000 troops, joined by Deng Wei's army, and pursued them towards Zao and Sui. Zhang Xianzhong and his men, frustrated by their resistance, heard that Gao Yingxiang's army had entered the pass, so they joined forces with Lao Hui with over ten battalions and marched towards Zhechuan and Shangnan, all the way to Shangzhou. In April Zhang Yingchang, and others were assigned to defend the key routes north and south of the Han River. They also requested an imperial decree to the emperor to defend the northern part of the river. Hong Chengchou personally led He Renlong, Cao Wenzhao, and Liu Chenggong into Shaanxi to fight. However, even at the outset of the deployment, numerous loopholes were discovered. Officers and soldiers, lacking food and pay, became restless, and Deng Bi was killed by soldiers demanding food and pay. Fortunately, Cao Wenzhao's assistance prevented Hong Chengchou from being completely helpless. Cao Wenzhao and Zhang Quanchang lead 6,000 troops joining the suppression efforts from Shangzhou and Languan. Orders were issued to the prefectures and counties of Shaanxi, as well as the troops remaining in Shaanxi, to hold their cities and await the arrival of the main force, allowing for a coordinated attack while Hong Chengchou deploying over 100,000 troops, and encircling the entire Shaanxi border area.

Cao Wenzhao and Zuo Liangyu took the opportunity to tighten the encirclement. In May, Cao Wenzhao defeated the rebels in Qinshui and Liaocheng. In response to Cao Wenzhao's fierce advance, the rebels sought refuge and moved to northern Henan to join forces. Gao Yingxiang, Li Zicheng, Zhang Xianzhong, Cao Cao, and others arrived and defeated Deng Bi's army in Lin County, which had led Sichuan troops and Shizhu Tusi troops to the northern Henan front. Tusi Ma Fengyi was killed in the battle. Upon learning of this, Emperor Chongzhen immediately ordered Cao Wenzhao to move his troops to the northern Henan battlefield. In July, Cao Wenzhao led five battalions of troops to launch a surprise attack at night, killed the rebel leader.

== Death ==
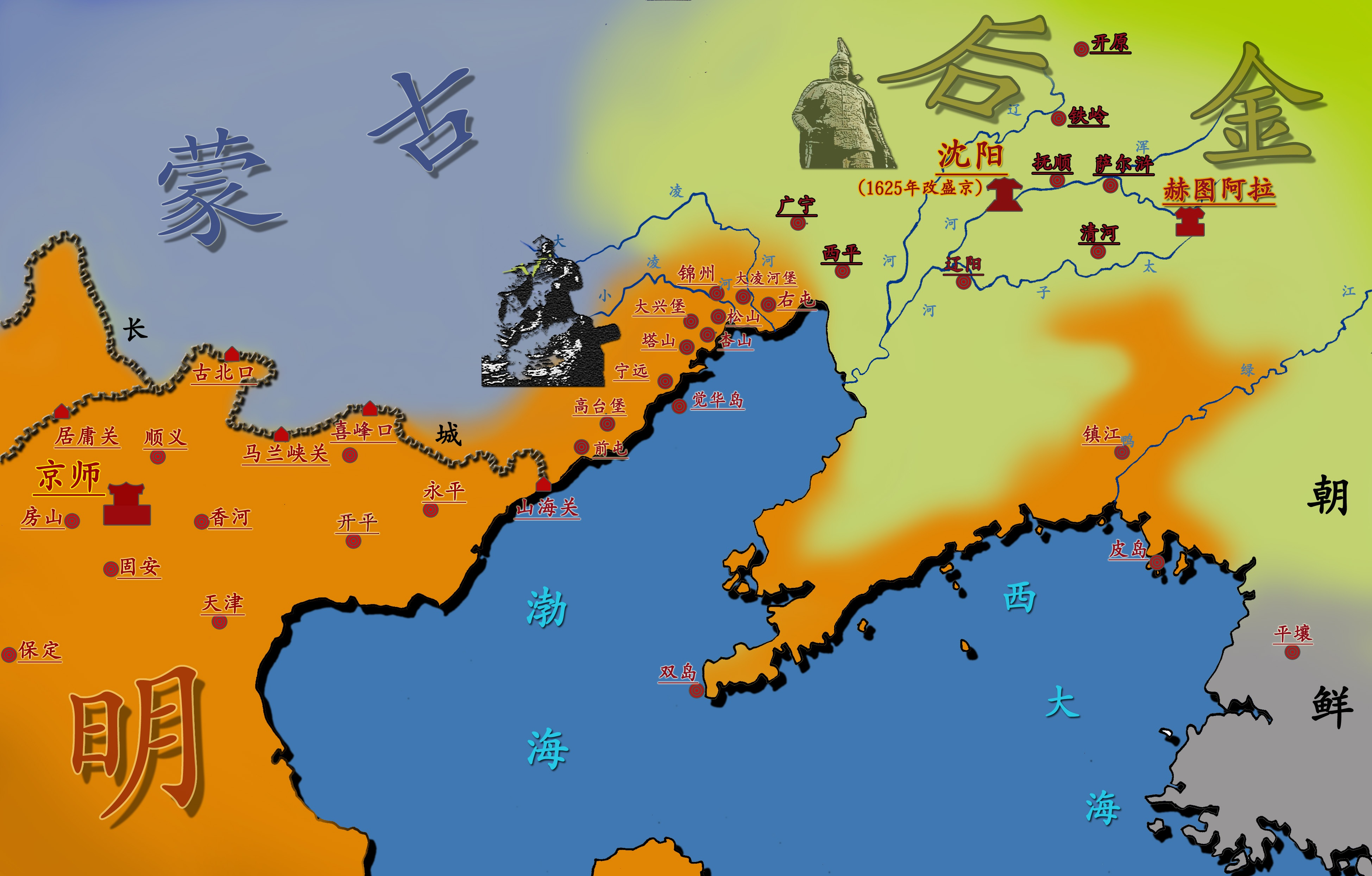
The Guanningjin fortifications from Shanhai through Ningyuan to Jinzhou, which garrisoned Cao Wenzhao's elite Guan Ning cavalry

Following this, various peasant rebels led by Gao Yingxiang, and Zhang Xianzhong, with total number almost 200,000 men attacked Fengxiang and advanced towards Weiyang and Longzhou. Cao Wenzhao rushed from Hanzhong to intercept them as the rebels on their way to Jingning, Qin'an, Qingshui, and Qinzhou. Because the combined forces of Wenzhao, Zhang Quanchang, and Zhang Waijia only numbered 6,000, and the disparity in strength between the two sides was significant, Hong Chengchou appealed to the imperial court for help, but received no instructions. In June, the Ming army encountered the peasant army at Luanmachuan. Liu Honglie, the vanguard commander, was captured, and soon after, his lieutenants Ai Wannian and Liu Guozhen were killed in battle. Later, Cao Wenzhao arrived at Hong Chengchou's encampment, upon learning of his fellow general Ai Wannian's death, Chao Wenzhao flew into a rage, "drawing his sword and slashing the ground, glaring and cursing." He then pleaded with Hong Chengchou to lead an army for revenge. Hong Chengchou, already exhausted from a series of defeats, was overjoyed and immediately encouraged him.

Cao Wenzhao then led 3,000 men from Ningzhou and encountered the peasant army at Qiutou Town in Zhenning (present-day Zhengning County, Gansu Province). His brother, Cao Bianjao, led the assault and scaling the city walls and killed 500 enemies. Cao Wenzhao continued his advance pursuing the enemy for 30 miles, with Cao Wenzhao following behind with his infantry. As he led his famous Guan Ning cavalry pursuing the retreating rebels, Suddenly as they reached Qiutou town in Zhenning (present day Zhenning Buyei and Miao Autonomous County), tens of thousands rebel cavalry led by Li Zicheng ambushed and surrounded them. Cao Wenzhao fought heard to break through the encirclement, personally slaughtering dozens of peasant soldiers and run from his pursuers for several miles, until he became exhausted, he drew his sword and committed suicide. The rebels celebrated his death.

== Character evaluation ==
Due to Cao Wenzhao's outstanding performance in the pacification of rebels in Shanxi, Shaanxi, and Guanzhong; Ming's Imperial Censor official Zhang Chenji wrote to the court, wrote in his letter of recommendation to the court to promote Cao Wenzhao into bigger military authority in Shanxi, as Zhang Chenji felt that his reputation alone could terrify the rebels who were native of Shaanxi province.

Cao Wenzhao and his brother Cao Bianjiao were known to be ruthless during the pacification of rebels, as their soldiers slaughtered rebels as well as civilians alike to turn in heads for rewards. At one point an official even submitted female heads, claiming they were bandits.

Cao Wenzhao was posthumously named Zhongguo by the Qing dynasty.

Qianlong Emperor praised Cao Wenzhao as a courageous man who was well-versed in military.

Zhang Tingyu praised Cao Wenzhao as wàn rén dí (萬人敵) (Lit. a warrior with strength rqual to ten thousand men) for his military prowess.

== Bibliography ==
- Fang, Xiuqi; Su, Yun; Zheng, Jingyun; Xiao, Lingbo; Wei, Zhudeng; Yin, Jun (2024). The Social Impacts of Climate Change in China Over the Past 2000 Years. Springer Nature Singapore. ISBN 9789819702022.
- Swope, Kenneth (2014). The Military Collapse of China's Ming Dynasty. Routledge, Taylor & Francis. ISBN 9781134462094.
