= Yuan Shizhong =

Chinese Rebel leader

Yuan Shizhong (died 1643) was a rebel leader in the 1640s, the later Ming dynasty, China. A Henan native, he gathered a peasant army against the Ming government. In 1643, he briefly joined Li Zicheng, but left before the Battle of Kaifeng. He was killed by Li Guo, a general of Li Zicheng.

== See also ==
- Li Zicheng
