= Ningzhou =

Ningzhou may refer to:

- 18843 Ningzhou, a main-belt asteroid discovered in 1999
- Ningzhou Town, a town in Huaning County, Yuxi, Yunnan, China
- Ningzhou (historical prefecture), a former prefecture in modern Gansu, China between the 6th and 20th centuries
