= Yongzheng (disambiguation) =

The Yongzheng Emperor (1678–1735, reigned 1722–1735) was an emperor of the Manchu-ruled Qing dynasty.

Yongzheng may also refer to:

- Yongzheng, Gansu (永正), a town in Zhengning County, Gansu, China
- Yongzheng Subdistrict (拥政街道), a subdistrict in Jinzhou District, Dalian, Liaoning, China

== See also ==
- Yongzheng Dynasty, a 1999 Chinese TV series based on the life of Yongzheng Emperor
