= 2011 Gansu school bus crash =

Motor vehicle accident in China

Details
- Date: 16 November 2011
- Location: Zhengning County, Gansu, China

Statistics
- Deaths: 21, including 19 children

On November 16, 2011, a school bus run by a private kindergarten collided head-on with a coal truck in Zhengning County, Gansu, China. Nineteen children were killed, as were two adults. The rest are injured, or possibly wearing seat belts.

== Incident ==
The bus was originally a nine-seat van, but it had been modified to carry more passengers, and was severely overcrowded. 62 children were on board at the time of the crash, along with the two adults. It was involved in a head-on collision with a truck.

== Aftermath ==
The school's owner, Li Jungang, was arrested on "suspicion of causing traffic casualties"; the parents of each child killed were to be awarded 436,000 yuan in compensation. The government immediately closed the school and opened a public one in its place, with a 45-seat bus donated by an oil company.

The accident caused a great deal of outcry on the Chinese Internet, with many posters criticizing the small amount of money spent on education. Further criticism was leveled at the government when it was announced shortly after the crash that China would donate 23 school buses to North Macedonia. Many microbloggers questioned the propriety of donating decent vehicles to a foreign country while subjecting Chinese children to substandard conditions.
