= Battle of Nanyang =

1641–1642 battle in Nanyang, Henan, China

Date	1641–1642
Location	Nanyang, Henan, China
Result	Rebel victory: Nanyang sacked and massacred
Territorial changes	Li Zicheng captures Neixiang, Biyang, Yuzhou, etc.

Belligerents
Rebels	Ming dynasty

Commanders and leaders
Li Zicheng	Zhu Yuqi †; Qiu Maosu †

Casualties and losses
Unknown	Thousands

The Battle of Nanyang (Chinese: 南陽之戰) took place in 1641 and 1642 in Nanyang, an important city in China's Henan Province. This city is an ancient original place of the Silk Road. At the end of the Ming dynasty, many battles took place in Nanyang. In 1641, Li Zicheng attacked Nanyang and finally took control of the west of this city from the Ming dynasty. In 1642, he attacked Nanyang again and took control of the whole city. And that war was called Battle of Nanyang, which lasted nearly a year.
