= Sun Chuanting =

Chinese Ming dynasty politician (1593–1643)

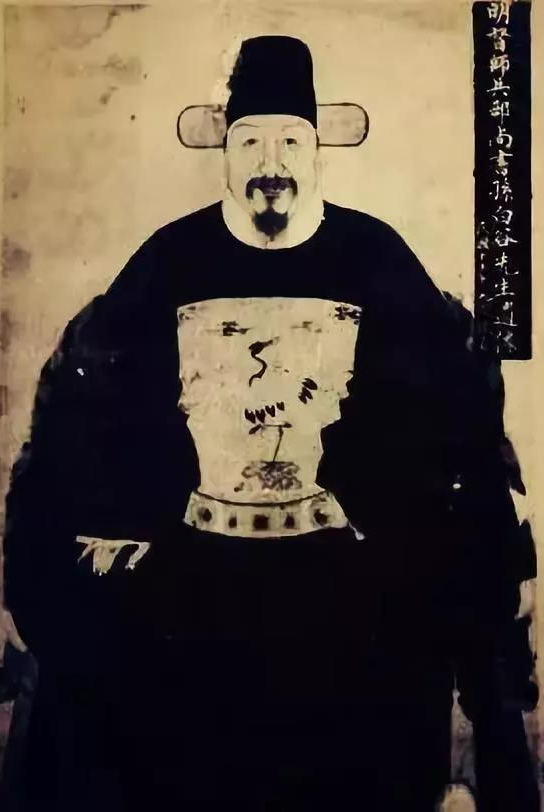
- Sun Chuanting's portrait
- Born: 1 January 1593; Dai County, Shanxi, Ming dynasty
- Died: 3 November 1643 (aged 50); Tongguan County, Shaanxi, Ming dynasty
- Military career
- Allegiance: Ming dynasty (to 1643)
- Service years: 1636–1643
- Rank: Field Marshal
- Commands: Governor of Shaanxi; Minister of War; Field Marshal
- Conflicts: Battle of Zhouzhi; Battle of Tongguan Nanyuan; Decisive Battles of Henan; Battle of Nanyang; Battle of Zhuxianzhen; Battle of Tongguan

Sun Chuanting (Chinese: 孫傳庭; pinyin: Sūn Chuántíng; 1 January 1593 – 3 November 1643), courtesy name Boya (百雅), art name Baigu (白谷), posthumous name Zhongjing (忠靖), was a politician of the Chinese Ming dynasty, serving as Minister of War (Bingbu Shangshu), and Field Marshal (Dushi). He led 10,000 Ming troops against Li Zicheng's 70,000 troops. He was defeated and killed by Li Zicheng in the Battle of Tongguan in 1643.

Sun Chuanting was described by history records as a tall and muscular man who was physically strong and excelled in horseback archery in his early days. Graduating as jinshi in 1619, he rose in 1635 to be Governor of Shaanxi, and by active measures stamped out the existing rebel movement. After an unsatisfactory campaign in Henan against the rebels there, he became Viceroy of Shandong and a part of Zhili. The fall of Jinan in 1639 was made a pretext for imprisoning him; however, in 1642 he was appointed Vice President of the Board of War and hastened with the garrison of Beijing to relieve Kaifeng, long besieged by Li Zicheng.

After Sun scored some initial victories, Li retreated his forces while leaving behind mass amounts of valuables. The Ming troops were undisciplined and broke rank to loot the valuables. Li then countered attacked and scattered the Ming troops. Sun had no choice but to retreat to Shaanxi as Viceroy. He planned to hold off Li's forces until Ming reinforcements could arrive. But in spite of Sun's objections that all the trained soldiers were dead and the new recruits not yet serviceable, Chongzhen Emperor wanted a quick victory against the rebels and Sun was obliged to advance against Li. Li soon scattered his raw levies.

With great difficulty he raised fresh forces and again advanced. At first successful, he reached the Jia District only to find that heavy rains had made it impossible for supplies to come forward. He therefore fell back with two divisions, pursued by the rebels. The inexperienced artillerymen deserted their guns and a rout ensued, 40,000 men being lost. Li followed up his advantage, and in November the Tong Pass was forced and Sun was killed, fighting to the last.

== In popular culture ==
Sun Chuanting is a primary character in the 2013 Chinese historical film Fall of Ming (Chinese: 大明劫), played by actor Leon Dai.

== See also ==
- Li Zicheng
- History of Ming
- Hong Chengchou
