= The Hungry Lamb =

The Hungry Lamb: Traveling in the Late Ming Dynasty
- Developer: ZerocreationGame
- Publishers: ZerocreationGame; 2P Games
- Engine: Unity
- Platform: Windows
- Release: April 23, 2024

The Hungry Lamb: Traveling in the Late Ming Dynasty is a 2024 visual novel video game developed by ZerocreationGame and published by both ZerocreationGame and 2P Games.

== Release ==
The Hungry Lamb would later be pulled from the Japanese Nintendo Switch store due to its age rating, though it would be restored after three months.

== Reception ==
RPGFan criticized how most choices would only lead to a mere bad ending, and how multiple dialogue options would route to the same conclusion such as in Genshin Impact. Matt Sainsbury, editor-in-chief of Digitally Downloaded, praised The Hungry Lamb as something "viscerally, uncomfortably explicit" in terms of its themes. However, the poor English localization of the game was considered a hindrance. The visual presentation was praised by critics.

On 18 March 2025, The Hungry Lamb sold over 1 million copies and acquired an Overwhelmingly Positive rating on Steam from 42,000+ user reviews.

== Sequel ==
ZerocreationGame would later begin work on a sequel titled The Weeping Swan: Ten Days of the City's Fall.
