= Ning Prefecture =

Historical administrative division in Gansu, China

Ningzhou or Ning Prefecture (寧州) was a zhou (prefecture) in imperial China centering on modern Ning County, Gansu, China. It existed from 554 to 1913.

== Geography ==
The administrative region of Ningzhou in the Tang dynasty is in modern northeastern Gansu bordering Shaanxi. It probably includes parts of modern:

- Under the administration of Qingyang:
  - Ning County
  - Zhengning County
