= Kenneth M. Swope =

American historian

Kenneth Michael Swope is an American historian and author. He is the Leo A. Shifrin Chair of Military & Naval History at the United States Naval Academy. He is also General Bufford Blount Professor of Military History and Senior Fellow of the Dale Center for the Study of War & Society at the University of Southern Mississippi. He formerly taught history at the Marist College and Ball State University.

== Education ==
Swope completed his bachelor's degree in history at the College of Wooster in 1992. He completed his master's degree in Chinese Studies at the University of Michigan in 1995. He completed his Ph.D. in history at the University of Michigan in 2001.

== Career ==
Swope reviews books for The Journal of Chinese Military History and serves on the board of directors for the Chinese Military History Society. He is an alumnus of the Fulbright Program, having received a Fulbright grant in 1999.

== Bibliography ==
His books include:

- A Dragon's Head and a Serpent's Tail: Ming China and the First Great East Asian War, 1592–1598 (2009)
- The Military Collapse Of China's Ming Dynasty, 1618–44 (2014)
- Warfare in China since 1600 (2017)
- Early Modern East Asia: War, Commerce, and Cultural Exchange (2017)
- On the Trail of the Yellow Tiger: War, Trauma, and Social Dislocation in Southwest China during the Ming-Qing Transition (2018)
- The Ming World (2019)
- Warfare and Culture in World History (2020)
- Struggle for Empire: The Battles of General Zuo Zongtang (2024)
