= Jiashen Incident =

1644 rebellion in Beijing, China which deposed the Ming dynasty

- Part of the Ming–Qing transition
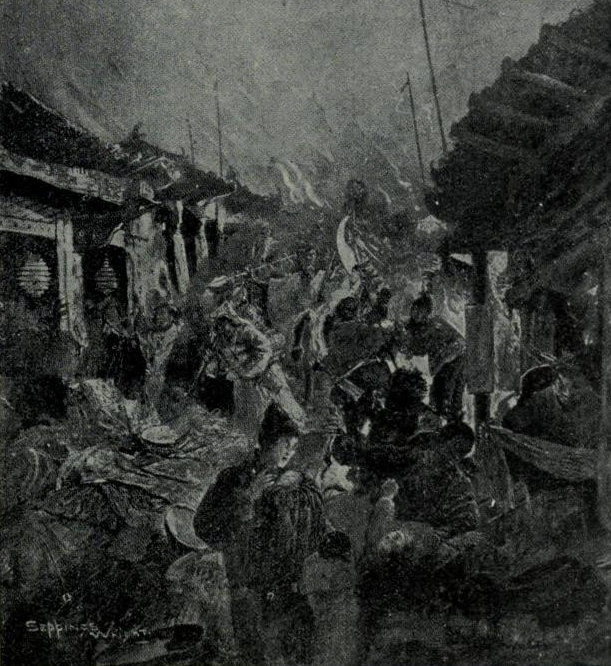
- 20th-century illustration showing Li Zicheng's army burning and looting Beijing
Date	22–25 April 1644
Location	Beijing, China
Result	Ming dynasty overthrown: Chongzhen Emperor commits suicide; Shun dynasty occupies Beijing

Belligerents
Ming dynasty	Shun dynasty

Commanders and leaders
Chongzhen Emperor ‡‡	Li Zicheng

Strength
250,000 (excluding 100,000 reinforcements)	1,300,000

Casualties and losses
40,000 killed (included 25,000 Jinyiwei agents)	

The Jiashen Incident (simplified Chinese: 甲申之变; traditional Chinese: 甲申之變), also known as the Battle of Beijing, took place in 1644 in the areas surrounding Beijing, and was fought between forces of the incumbent Ming dynasty and the Shun dynasty founded by peasant rebel leader Li Zicheng. It eventually resulted in the collapse of the Ming dynasty. Remnants of the Ming imperial family, whose regime is known as the Southern Ming dynasty in historiography, would continue to rule parts of southern China until 1662.

Li Zicheng led his rebel army to attack the Ming capital Beijing from two directions (north and south). The eunuch official Du Zhizhi (杜之秩) ordered the Ming forces defending Beijing to open the city gates and let Li Zicheng's army in. After the fall of Beijing, the last Ming ruler, the Chongzhen Emperor, committed suicide by hanging himself on a tree in Mount Mei near the Forbidden City. No actual battle was fought in Beijing itself as the rebels marched into the capital unopposed, and even after occupying Beijing, the rebels did not face any resistance. Li Zicheng's short-lived Shun dynasty would be subsequently defeated by forces of the Manchu-led Qing dynasty, which would go on to rule China proper until its fall in 1912.

== See also ==
- Juyongguan
- Battle of Shanhai Pass
- History of Beijing
- Jingkang incident
- Sexagenary cycle
