= Shun dynasty =

Chinese dynasty during the Ming–Qing transition (1644–1646)

Great Shun 大順
- 1644–1646
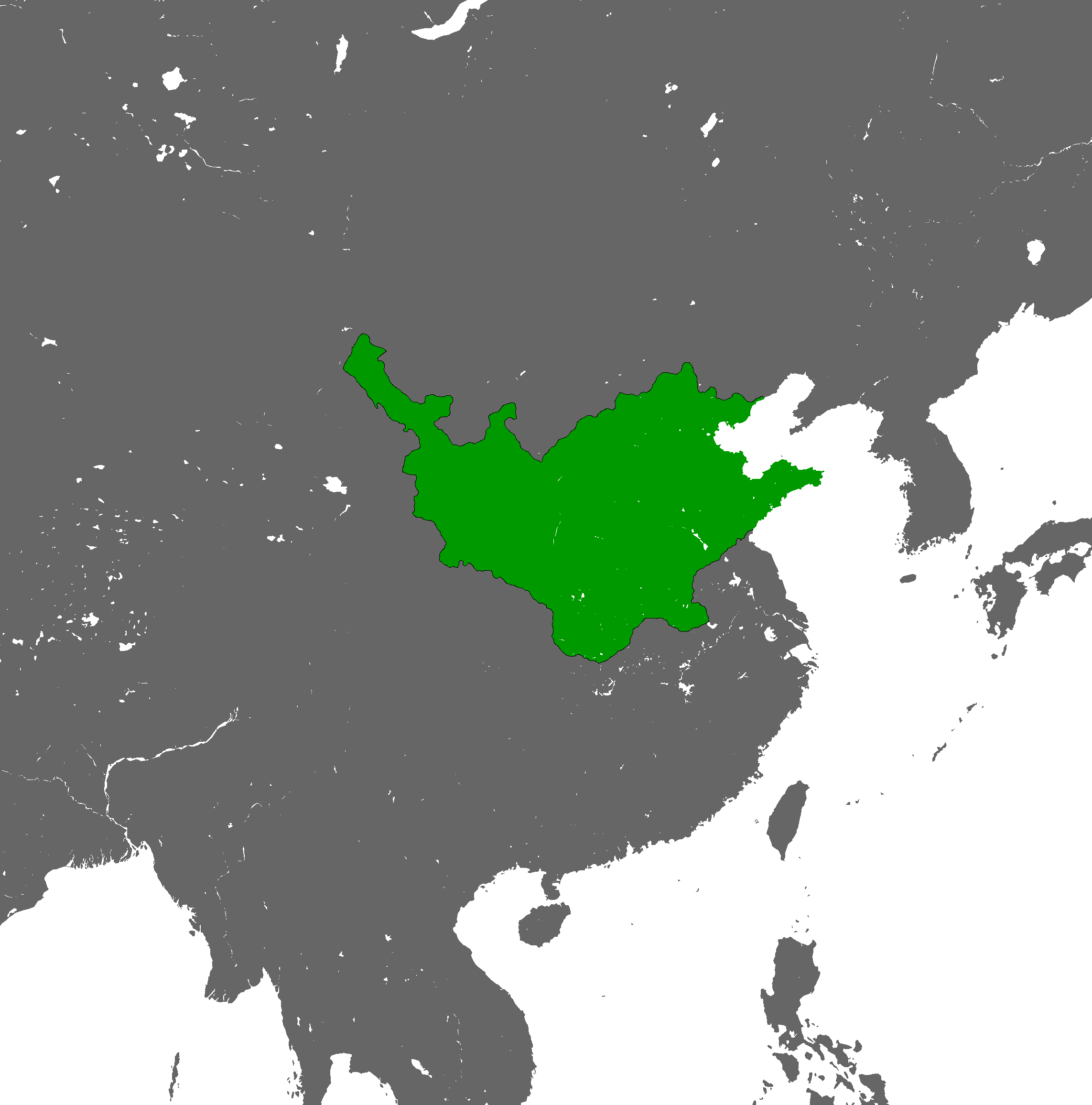
- The Shun dynasty at its peak in 1644
- Status: Short-lived dynasty of China
- Capital: Xi'an (1644); Beijing (1644 – 5 June 1644)
- Common languages: Chinese
- Religion: Buddhism; Taoism; Confucianism; Chinese folk religion
- Government: Monarchy
- Emperor
  - 1644–1645: Li Zicheng
- Historical era: Transition from Ming to Qing
  - Established in Xi'an: 8 February 1644
  - Captured Beijing/Death of the Chongzhen Emperor: April 1644
  - Battle of Shanhai Pass: 27 May 1644
  - Proclamation as the Yongchang Emperor: 3 June 1644
  - Fall of Beijing: 5 June 1644
  - Surrender to the Southern Ming: 1646
- Currency: Chinese coin, Chinese cash
Preceded by	Succeeded by
Ming dynasty	Qing dynasty; Southern Ming
- Today part of: China

The Shun dynasty, (Note: simplified Chinese: 顺朝; traditional Chinese: 順朝; pinyin: Shùn cháo) officially the Great Shun, (Note: simplified Chinese: 大顺; traditional Chinese: 大順; pinyin: Dà Shùn) also known as Li Shun, (Note: simplified Chinese: 李顺; traditional Chinese: 李順; pinyin: Lǐ Shùn) was a short-lived dynasty of China that existed during the Ming–Qing transition. The dynasty was founded in Xi'an on 8 February 1644, the first day of the lunar year, by Li Zicheng, the leader of a large peasant rebellion, by proclaiming himself "emperor" (皇帝) instead of the title "king" (王) before founding the dynasty.

The capture of Beijing by the Shun forces in April 1644 marked the end of the Ming dynasty, but Li Zicheng failed to solidify his political and military control, and in late May 1644 he was defeated at the Battle of Shanhai Pass by the joint forces of Ming general Wu Sangui (who had defected to the Qing dynasty), with Manchu prince Dorgon. When he fled back to Beijing in early June, Li finally proclaimed himself the Yongchang Emperor of the Great Shun and left the capital the next day after setting the palace ablaze and ransacking the government offices. He may have intended to resume his Imperial claims later on by proclaiming his accession in the Forbidden City. After the death of the emperor, Shun remnants joined with the Southern Ming in Nanjing, while continuing to refer to Li as their "deceased emperor". The Shun dynasty weakened dramatically after the death of Li Zicheng in 1645. The successors, his brother Li Zijing and nephew Li Guo, could not fight back and the dynasty ended in 1649 when Li Guo died in Nanning, Guangxi.

== Emperor ==
Personal name (birth–death)	Period of reign	Era names and dates
Li Zicheng 李自成 (1606–1645)	1644–1645	Yongchang (永昌) 1644–1645

== See also ==
- Xi dynasty
- Qing dynasty
- Southern Ming
- Late Ming peasant rebellions

== Notes ==
Preceded by Ming dynasty	Dynasties in Chinese history 1644	Succeeded by Qing dynasty
