= Ma Shilong =

Ma Shilong (1594–1634), courtesy name Yuancang, was a Hui Muslim general in the Ming dynasty. He was born in 1594 in what is now called Ningxia. He was a protégé of Sun Chengzong.

He started his career as Provincial Level Knight, and served as Youji General in Xuanfu (nowadays Xuanhua, Hebei). He is responsible for the loss in Campagne of Liuhe in the 5th year of Tianqi (1625). In the 7th year of Chongzhen (1634), he died of illness.
