= Li Zicheng =

Chinese rebel leader (1606–1645)

Li Zicheng 李自成
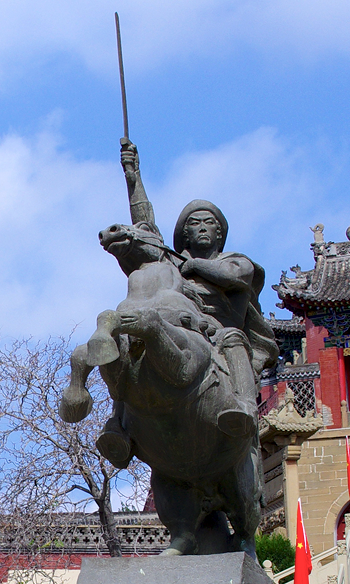
- Statue located on Panlong Mountain, Mizhi County

Emperor of the Shun dynasty
- Reign: 1644–1645
- Enthronement: 8 February 1644; Xi'an; 3 June 1644; Hall of Martial Valor, Shuntian Prefecture
- Successor: Li Zijing

Emperor of China
- Reign: 1644–1645
- Predecessor: Chongzhen Emperor (Ming dynasty)
- Successor: Shunzhi Emperor (Qing dynasty)
- Born: Li Hongji (李鴻基); 22 September 1606; Li Jiqian village (李繼遷寨), Yan'an Prefecture, northeast Shaanxi, Ming dynasty
- Died: 1645 (aged 38–39); Jiugong Mountains, Qing dynasty
- Spouse: Gao Guiying
Names
- Li Zicheng (李自成)
Era name and dates
- Yongchang (永昌): 1644–1645
- House: Li
- Dynasty: Shun

Li Zicheng
- Chinese: 李自成
Transcriptions
Standard Mandarin
- Hanyu Pinyin: Lǐ Zìchéng
- Wade–Giles: Li^{3} Tzŭ^{4}-ch'eng^{2}
- IPA: [lì tsɹ̩̂.ʈʂʰə̌ŋ]

Li Hongji
- Traditional Chinese: 李鴻基
- Simplified Chinese: 李鸿基
Transcriptions
Standard Mandarin
- Hanyu Pinyin: Lǐ Hóngjī
- Wade–Giles: Li Hung-chi

Thunder King
- Traditional Chinese: 闖王
- Simplified Chinese: 闯王
Transcriptions
Standard Mandarin
- Hanyu Pinyin: Chuǎng Wáng
- Wade–Giles: Ch'uang Wang

Li Zicheng (22 September 1606 – 1645), born Li Hongji, also known as the Dashing King (Chuang Wang), was a Chinese rebel leader who helped overthrow the Ming dynasty in April 1644. He claimed the imperial throne as the Yongchang Emperor of the Shun dynasty, which controlled much of North China for a short period. He died a year later.

Born into an impoverished family in Shaanxi, Li became involved in the growing peasant rebellions during the late Ming period around 1630. Nicknamed "the Dashing King", in the years that followed he suffered various setbacks but eventually established himself as the foremost rebel leader, and his call for the equal distribution of land brought him a large following.

In 1643, Li captured the city of Xiangyang and declared himself king, proclaiming a new Shun dynasty. In 1644 he entered Beijing unopposed, and eventually declared himself emperor, bringing the Ming dynasty's rule in Beijing to an end. Li's rule in Beijing was short-lived, and a month after capturing the city he was defeated at the Battle of Shanhai Pass by the joint forces of Qing prince-regent Dorgon and former Ming general Wu Sangui. After abandoning Beijing, Li suffered further defeats at the hands of the pursuing Qing army, and he is generally believed to have died in Hubei in 1645, though the circumstances remain unclear.

== Early life ==
Li Zicheng was born in 1606 as Li Hongji to an impoverished family of farmers in Li Jiqian village, Yan'an prefecture, northeast Shaanxi province. Li Zicheng claimed to be descended from Li Jiqian. Li Zicheng had a brother who was 20 years older and raised Li Zicheng alongside his own son and Zicheng's nephew, Li Guo. While Li Zicheng was literate, the source of his education is disputed. Over the course of his late adolescence and early adulthood, Li worked on a farm, in a wine shop and at a blacksmith's.

Li joined the army at the age of 16, but later left and entered the postal service in 1626.

By the late Ming dynasty era, the government was weak financially and struggled to deal with environmental problems and widespread disease (smallpox and possibly the plague).

In February 1629, Li Zicheng moved to Ganzhou (now Ganzhou District, Zhangye City, Gansu Province) with his nephew Li Guo to join the army. At that time, the general of Ganzhou was Yang Zhaoji, and the lieutenant general was Wang Guo. Li Zicheng was soon promoted to the rank of general in the army by Wang Guo. In the same year, in a dispute over unpaid wages, he killed Wang Guo and the local county magistrate in Yuzhong (now Yuzhong County, Lanzhou City, Gansu Province) and launched a mutiny.

According to Zheng Lian, an early-Qing government student from Shangqiu, in 1630 after Li Zicheng defaulted on a debt to Ai Zhao, a Juren, Li befriended some unruly young men and clashed with the local magistrate. As complaints about Li's debt default reached the magistrate, Li was beaten and put on public display in an iron collar and shackles without food and water. The magistrate, a man by the name of Ai, struck a guard who tried to give Li shade and water. A group of sympathetic peasants then assembled and saved Li by breaking him out of town.

Another account said that after taking part in the suppression of the rebel Gao Yingxiang, Li became a rebel due to charges of stealing rations.

== Becoming a rebel ==
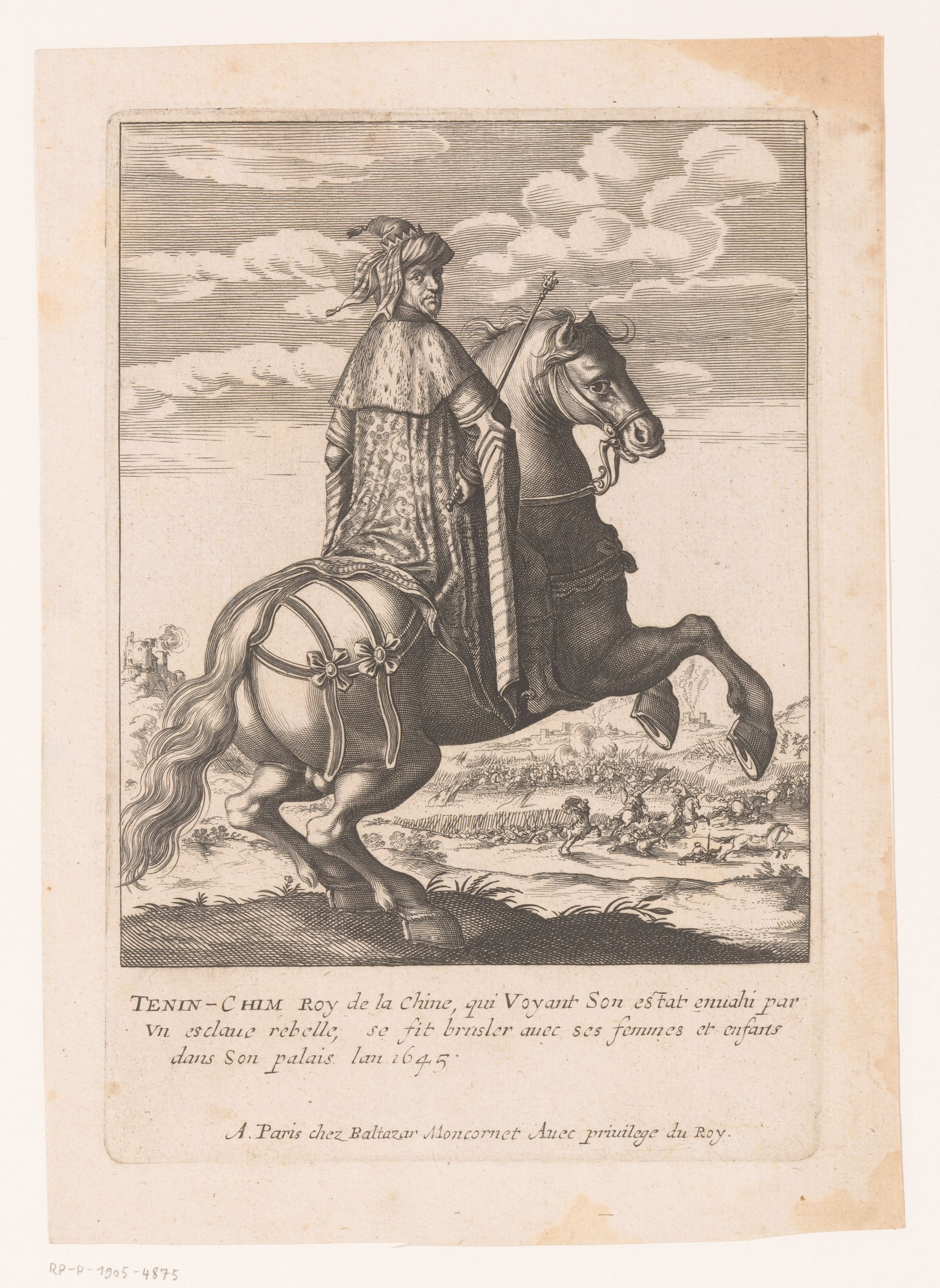
European impression of a Chinese emperor on horseback, possibly Li Zicheng

Some years earlier, in 1622, Xu Hongru, the leader of the White Lotus Societies had conspired with Yu Hongzhi, a peasant rebel leader from Jingzhou (now Jingxian County, Hebei Province) and a rebel named Zhang Shipei from Caozhou (now Caoxian County, Shandong Province) to launch an uprising on the Mid-Autumn Festival. Their plan had been leaked, so it was launched instead in May. Xu Hongru revolted three months early out of fear of a preemptive action by the government. He declared himself Zhongxing Fuliedi (literally, lucky, devoted lord of the restoration). In November of the same year, Xu Hongru was betrayed by his subordinates, arrested in Zou County, and taken to the capital, where he was executed. When Li Zicheng rose up to rebel in Mizhi, the so-called dongling fumang group which joined him refers to Xu Hongru's followers and their remnants. Gu Yingta testified to a direct line of succession from Xu Hongru to Li Zicheng's uprising. When Li Zicheng marched into Henan, the White Lotus Sect members organised by Xu Hongru are said to have made up his rebel forces.

When Li Zicheng openly rebelled, the White Lotus Society had long predicted that a figure with the surname "Li" would one day become the emperor. Li Zicheng tried to use faith to solidify his own legitimacy by consulting a soothsayer. However, the soothsayer denied Li Zicheng as the prophecied "Emperor Li", and foretold his imminent demise, after which Li had the soothsayer executed.

Li Zicheng and his cousin Li Guo joined a larger group of outlaws. When that group submitted to the Ming government, they left to join another. One night on an unspecified date, Li and his supporters attacked a town, won the allegiance of thousands of famished residents, and led them to plunder the region. Within ten days they joined together with other brigands, giving the title of Dashing General to Li and forming a fully functioning outlaw group, with their first real weapons. During his time as fugitive, Li Zicheng murdered his own wife after she committed adultery.

In 1631, after the rebel main force was defeated by Ming troops, the Li brothers formed their own group, which they dubbed the "Eighth Brigade".

Two years later, Li Zicheng appeared among the forces under the leadership of Gao Yingxiang, nicknamed The Dashing Prince, in northern Henan. Some sources credit him with taking Xiuwu County in Huaiqing prefecture, and killing its magistrate. Li Zicheng's own group further swelled after he absorbed another rebel group with 20,000 followers after their leader died, raising his own forces to the 30,000s. However, as his group grew in number, Li Zicheng became more suspicious of his men's loyalty. He accused one of them, Gao Jie, of being involved in an affair with his wife. This drove Gao and his followers to surrender to the Ming. Later, Li joined a rebel army led by Gao Yingxiang (高迎祥), nicknamed "the Dashing King." He inherited Gao's nickname and command of the rebel army after Gao's death. In late 1633 Li Zicheng followed Gao Yingxiang to the south across the Yellow River, but in the next year he went back to Shaanxi until 1635.

In 1635, Li Zicheng arrived in Lin County together with fellow rebels Gao Yingxiang, Zhang Xianzhong, Cao Cao, and others, where they defeated Deng Bi's army, which had led Sichuan troops and Shizhu Tusi troops to the northern Henan battlefield. In response to this, Ming general Cao Wenzhao led 3,000 men from Ningzhou and encountered the peasant army at Qiutou Town in Zhenning (present-day Zhengning County, Gansu Province). His brother, Cao Bianjao, led the assault, scaled the city walls and killed 500 enemies. Cao Wenzhao continued his advance pursuing the enemy for 30 miles, with Cao Wenzhao following behind with his infantry. As he led his famous Guan Ning cavalry pursuing the retreating rebels, suddenly, as they reached Qiutou town in Zhenning (present day Zhenning Buyei and Miao Autonomous County), tens of thousands of rebel cavalry led by Li Zicheng ambushed and surrounded them. Cao Wenzhao was killed in this battle.

In 1636, Ming's grand preceptor Hong Chengchou pushed away Li and his forces from Shaanxi to Henan. After the death of Gao Yingxiang, Li went on defensive, moved back and forth across the east and south Shaanxi mountainous borders fighting against Ming general Sun Chuanting soldiers.

In early 1638, Ming general Hong Chengchou was able to surprise Li Zicheng on the Shaanxi-Sichuan border and dealt him a heavy defeat. Betting on the poor quality of his Sichuanese contingent, Chengchou put them in the center of his line. As expected, they withdrew under the rebel attack, and pulled Li's troops down the center, at which point Chengchou's crack Shaanxi troops in reserve attacked the now-exposed rebels and caused the collapse of Li's army. In the summer of 1638, Hong renewed the pressure on Li, and hotly pursued him. Guessing that he was trying to flee through Tong Pass, Hong contacted Sun Chuanting, who established a three-pronged ambush. Li's army was trapped and destroyed, and he escaped with just 17 followers, remaining mostly inactive and hiding in the mountains of Shaanxi for the rest of 1638.

In 1639, an epidemic that would later become known as the Chongzhen Great Plague hit the Yangzi region and spread across the north. Famine and drought compounded the social discontent caused by the epidemic. Environmental disaster, disease, and the failure of the Chongzhen government to protect its people led to major peasant uprisings across Northern China beginning in 1628, with Shaanxi province as an epicenter of rebellion. In 1639, Li suffered massive setbacks in eastern Shaanxi, followed by the death of his wife and concubines. He fled into the hills between Shang and Luo counties with a handful of his closest supporters. Other rebels such as Zhang Xianzhong and Luo Rucai already surrendered to the Ming government and encouraged Li Zicheng to join them, but he refused. Li Zicheng managed to survive and escaped the authorities as he was reportedly training martial arts and studying the history of Liu Bang while doing so. In the summer of 1639, Li Zicheng took advantage of Zhang Xianzhong's second rebellion as his distraction to escape from the difficult situation. However, as they faced another trouble, his closest subordinate and divination advisor Liu Zongmin suggest surrender. According to legend, Liu instead changed his mind after he witnessed a positive prognosis of Li's fortune. To prove his fortitude, Liu killed his own wife and concubines, and descended from Shaanxi with their remaining followers to the central plain of Henan.

Within three years, Li succeeded in rallying more than 30,000 men to his cause. They attacked and killed prominent government officials such as Sun Chuanting in Henan, Shanxi, and Shaanxi. As Li won more battles and gained more support, his army grew larger. Historians attribute this growth in numbers to Li's reputation as a Robin Hood-style figure who showed compassion to the poor and attacked only Ming officials.

Li advocated the slogans of "dividing land equally" and "abolishing the grain taxes payment system" which won great support from the peasants. The song, "Killing cattle and sheep, preparing tasty wine and opening the city gate to welcome the Dashing King" was widely spread at the time.

In 1641, rebel forces led by Li Zicheng sacked the Shaolin Monastery due to the monks' support of the Ming dynasty and the possible threat they posed to the rebels. This effectively destroyed the temple's fighting force.

The 1642 Kaifeng flood, caused by breaches of the Yellow River dikes by both sides, ended the siege of Kaifeng and killed over 300,000 of its 378,000 residents. After the battles of Luoyang and Kaifeng, the Ming government was unable to stop Li's rebellion, as most of its military force was involved in the battle against the Manchus in the north.

Later, in 1643, Li Zicheng's victory against Sun Chuanting in central Henan reaffirmed his decision to march west to Xi'an. According to most accepted theory, Li made his mind during a meeting in Xiangjing as he already ruled out the choice of march towards Nanjing or to Beijing. Modern historian Roger V. Des Forges has suggested that Li Zicheng may have considered Shaanxi because he was a native of the province and the fact that the city had served as the political center of the Han and Tang dynasties, whose political models he aspired to emulate. However, as Gu Cheng suggested, it is likely that the decision to go to Xi'an was made after the surprisingly complete rout of Sun Chanting's forces in: after the battle, Li pursued Sun as he retreated to the west. According to Zheng Lian, Sun had first gone north to Mengjin, on the south bank of the Yellow River, where he was so distraught at the sight of his men being killed that he tried to throw himself in the river; his subordinates were able to intervene and convinced him to continue resisting the rebels. Zheng Lian also reports an unlikely story that Sun went to Shouyang mountain in Yanshi county, east of Luoyang, to pay respects to the Shang loyalists Bo Yi and Shu Qi, who had starved themselves to death rather than live under the Zhou. On 12 November, Li Zicheng's forces took Wenxiang, and 4 days later they assaulted beat Sun Chuanting forces at Tongguan, while Sun Chuanting himself was killed during the ensuing battle. Gao Jie and Bai Guang'en then fled further. After assigned his subordinate to command Tongguan, Li Zicheng proceeded again to Xi'an. In the next four days, Li's forces manage to take the towns of Huayang, Huazhou, Weinan, and Lintong without any meaningful resistance.

== Shun dynasty ==
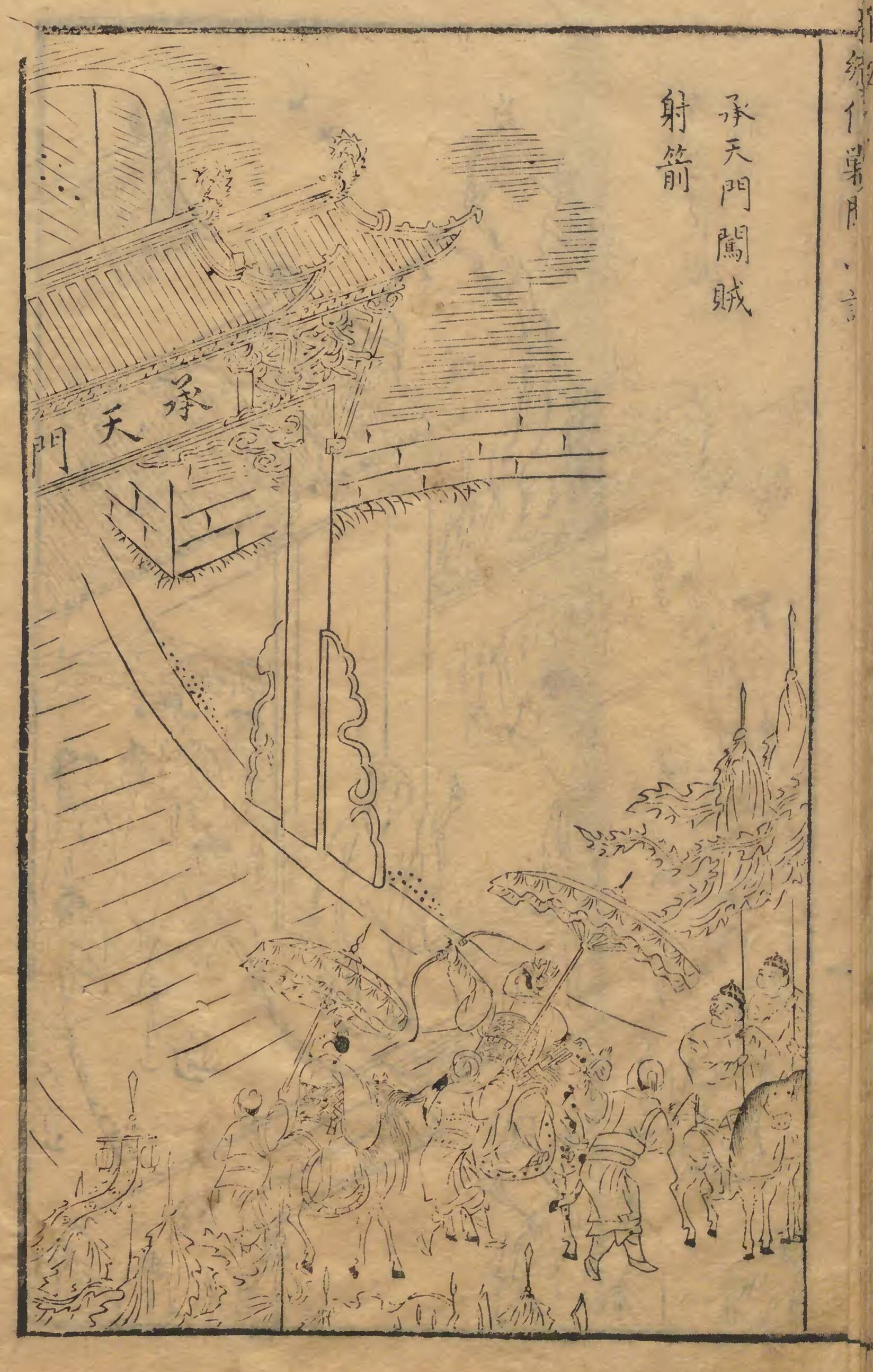
Li Zicheng's army approaching Chengtianmen, depicted in the Jiaochuang xiaoshuo.

By 1643, Li had captured Xiangyang and proclaimed himself "King of Xinshun" (新順王). On the Chinese New Year, which fell on 8 February, Li declared the founding of the "Great Shun" dynasty in Xi'an and proclaimed himself king (王).

In April 1644, Li and his 300,000 troops marched toward the Ming capital of Beijing, following a route that roughly aligned with the Great Wall of China to neutralize its heavily fortified garrisons. Li and his army reached the suburbs of the capital on 23 April. Instead of launching a full-scale attack on the city walls, Li sent the recently surrendered eunuch Du Xun to the Chongzhen Emperor, hoping to secure his surrender. However, the Emperor refused. The gates of Beijing were opened from the inside, allowing Li's forces to capture the city. The Chongzhen Emperor then hanged himself. Li proclaimed himself the emperor of the Shun dynasty and respected Li Jiqian as Taizu.

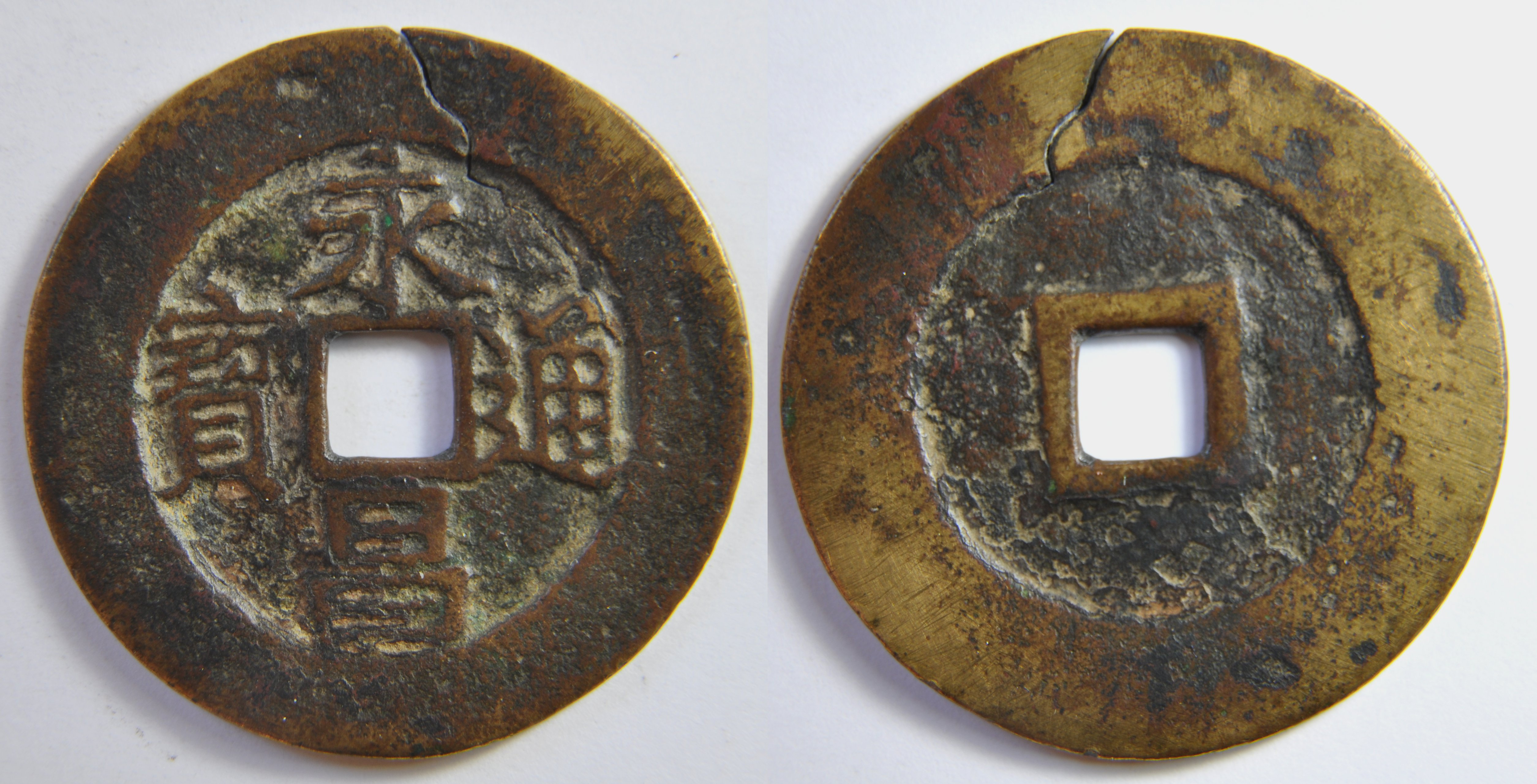
Yongchang Tongbao, coin issued by the Shun government

Li, like all historical contenders for the throne, claimed to have the Mandate of Heaven. Li's claim was seen as strengthening his legitimacy to the throne, especially in contrast to the foreign Manchus. He also gained the support of scholar-officials, which was crucial for ruling over the people of China in a Confucian state. The name of the dynasty is translated to mean "Obedient to Heaven".

Li's army was eventually defeated on 27 May 1644 at the Battle of Shanhai Pass by the combined forces of Manchurian Prince Dorgon and the Ming general Wu Sangui, who had defected to the Manchus. The Ming and Manchu forces captured Beijing on 6 June, where the Manchu ruler Fulin ascended to the throne as the Shunzhi Emperor, with Dorgon serving as his regent.

== Death ==
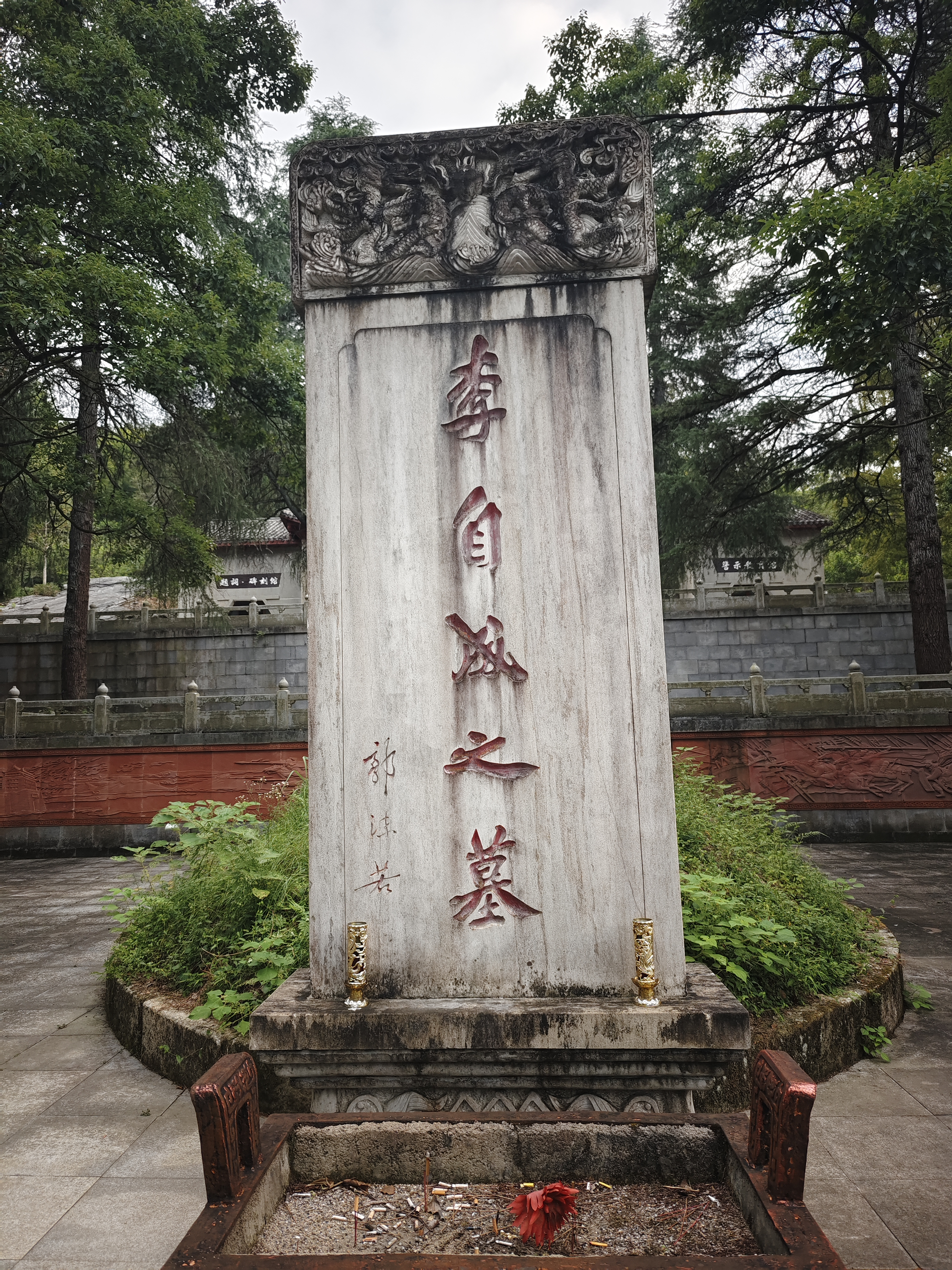
Tomb of Li Zicheng in Tongshan County, Hubei, the epitaph was inscribed by Guo Moruo.

When Wu Sangui and Prince Dorgon took control of Beijing, Li Zicheng fled to Xi'an. After the summer and fall of 1644, in October of that year, Dorgon sent several armies to expel Li Zicheng from his stronghold in Shaanxi. Qing forces led by Ajige, Dodo, and Shi Tingzhu (石廷柱) won consecutive battles against the Shun forces in Shanxi and Shaanxi, forcing Li Zicheng to abandon his headquarters in Xi'an in February 1645.

The circumstances surrounding Li Zicheng's death during his flight remain unclear, and there are multiple accounts, some of which are exaggerated. Most sources agree that he died in 1645. One account suggests that in the summer of 1645, Li attempted to raid a village for provisions with his remaining followers and was killed by the village guards. Another theory posits that Li became a monk and died in 1674.

== Historiography ==
Li Zicheng's rebel group's call for the "equalization of land" (jun tian) is thought to be a proto-socialist aspiration from the peasant class during the Ming dynasty, decries the land possession by the landlord and gentry classes. According to historian Roland Mousnier, Li Zicheng's rebel group, which was composed of salt smugglers, convoymen, and professional soldiers, was at first feared by ordinary peasants just like the Écorcheurs bandits, which were active during the Hundred Years' War in France.

Although the success of the Ming-Qing transition was attributed to the weakening of the Ming dynasty (exacerbated by Li Zicheng's rebellion), official historiography during the Qing dynasty regarded Li as an illegitimate usurper and outlaw. This view sought to discourage and demonize notions of rebellion against the Qing government by propagating that the Manchus put an end to Li's illegitimate rule and restored peace to the empire, thus receiving the Mandate of Heaven to rule China.

Throughout his rise, there were several occasions on which the Ming could have extinguished him, but Jurchen breaches of the Great Wall – the Jurchens had raided across the Ming Great Wall several times since 1629, including in 1634, 1638, and 1642 – distracted the Ming court's attention.

In the History of Ming compilation volume 309, Li Zicheng was described as having high cheekbones, deep-set eyes and a jackal-like voice.

Li Yan, a semi-mythical advisor of Li Zicheng who was thought to have died in 1644, has been suspected to be a metaphor for the rise and fall of Li Zicheng's rebellion, as historians doubt his existence in real life. However, recently a 2004 discovery of a Li family genealogical manuscript in Henan resolved much of the puzzle. It confirmed Li Yan as a real person, albeit blended with myths—a government student from Henei (not Qi), who rebelled in 1641, joined Li Zicheng, and was killed in 1644. This document showed how rumors evolved into mythistory, validating core elements while debunking exaggerations. Supposedly, Li Yan was among the first of Li Zicheng's non-peasant supporters, the local gentry class. According to popular lore, Li Yan was responsible for persuading the rebellious elements from his hometown to join Li Zicheng. Furthermore, Li Yan became the mastermind to gather more people's sympathy for Li Zicheng's cause by introducing his ideas of rule by benevolence, such as forbidding indiscriminate killing, along with other slogans like tax abolition.

== In popular culture ==
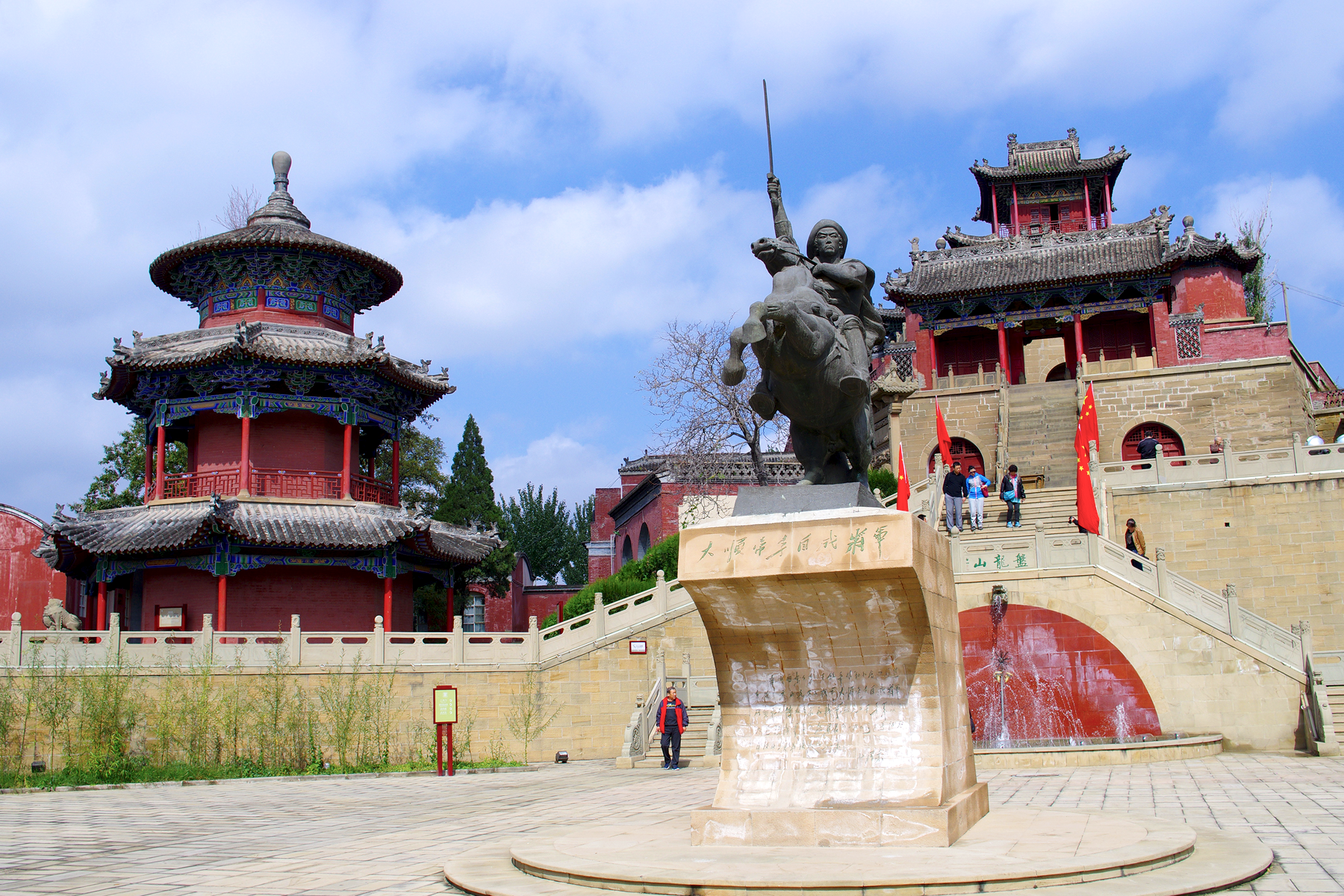
Monument of Li Zicheng on Mount Panlong, Mizhi County

Li appears as a bandit in Baifa Monü Zhuan, a wuxia novel by Liang Yusheng, where the heroine comments he is worthy of being a king. Li is featured as a character in some of the works of Hong Kong wuxia writer Jin Yong (Louis Cha). Li's rebellion against the Ming dynasty is featured in Sword Stained with Royal Blood, and his personality is analysed from the point of view of Yuan Chengzhi, the protagonist. In The Deer and the Cauldron, set in the Qing dynasty during the early reign of the Kangxi Emperor, Li is revealed to have survived and fathered a daughter, A'ke, with Chen Yuanyuan. Li is also briefly mentioned by name in Fox Volant of the Snowy Mountain and The Young Flying Fox.

Li is the main character of the historical epic novel Li Zicheng by Yao Xueyin.

Li also makes an appearance in the visual novel The Hungry Lamb: Traveling in the Late Ming Dynasty.

There are many stories and folklore attributed to Li Zicheng. One such story claims that when Li Zicheng was young, he killed one of his classmates and was promptly disowned by his family and shunned by his community.

== Bibliography ==
- Atwell, William (2008), "The T'ai-ch'ang, T'ien-ch'i, and Ch'ung-chen reigns, 1620–1644", in Frederick W. Mote and Denis Twitchett (ed.), The Cambridge History of China Volume 7: The Ming Dynasty, 1368–1644, Part 1, Cambridge: Cambridge University Press, pp. 585–640, ISBN 978-0-521-24332-2
- Hummel, Arthur W. Sr., ed. (1943). "Li Tzŭ-ch'êng" . Eminent Chinese of the Ch'ing Period. United States Government Printing Office.
- Mote, Frederick W. (1999), Imperial China: 900–1800, Cambridge, MA: Harvard University Press, ISBN 0-674-01212-7
- Roger V. Des Forges (2003). Cultural Centrality and Political Change in Chinese History; Northeast Henan in the Fall of the Ming. Stanford University Press. p. 178-179. ISBN 9789004421066.
- Shahar, Meir (2008). The Shaolin Monastery: history, religion, and the Chinese martial arts. University of Hawaii Press. ISBN 978-0-8248-3110-3.
- Swope, Kenneth (2014), The Military Collapse of China's Ming Dynasty, Routledge
- Frederic E. Wakeman jr. (1977). "Rebellion and Revolution: The Study of Popular Movements in Chinese History". The Journal of Asian Studies. 36 (2). doi:10.2307/2053720.
- Wakeman, Frederic (1985), The Great Enterprise: The Manchu Reconstruction of Imperial Order in Seventeenth-Century China, Berkeley, Los Angeles, and London: University of California Press, ISBN 978-0-520-04804-1. In two volumes.

"Dashing King" House of Li Born: 22 September 1606 Died: 1645
Regnal titles
| Preceded by Chongzhen Emperor (Ming dynasty) | Emperor of China; Shun dynasty 1643–1645 | Succeeded by Shunzhi Emperor (Qing dynasty) |
