= Zhengning County =

Zhengning County 正宁县
- County
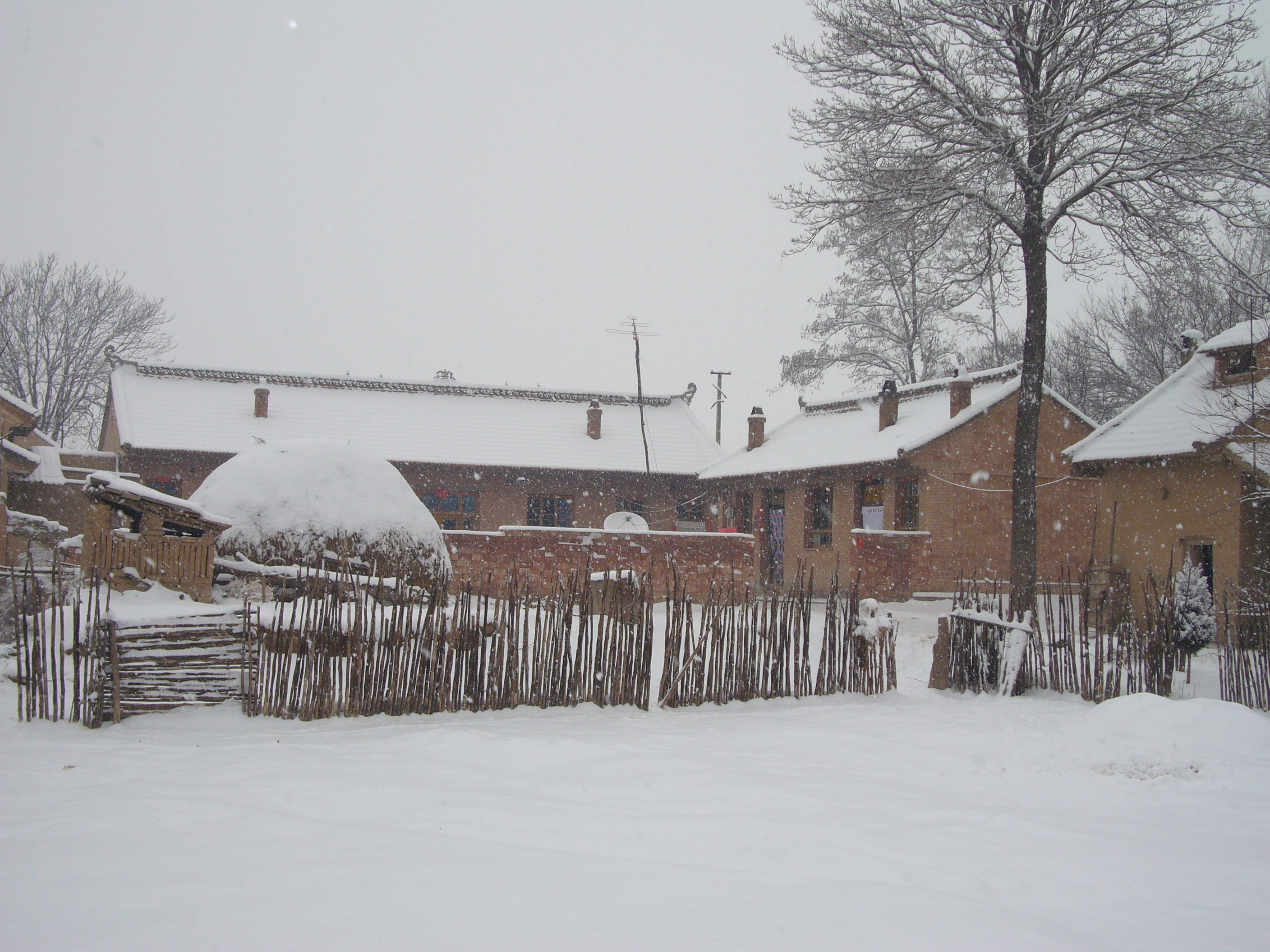
- A home in rural Zhengning

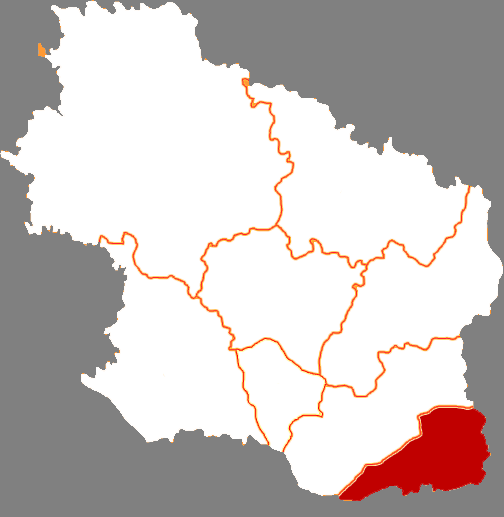
- Zhengning in Qingyang

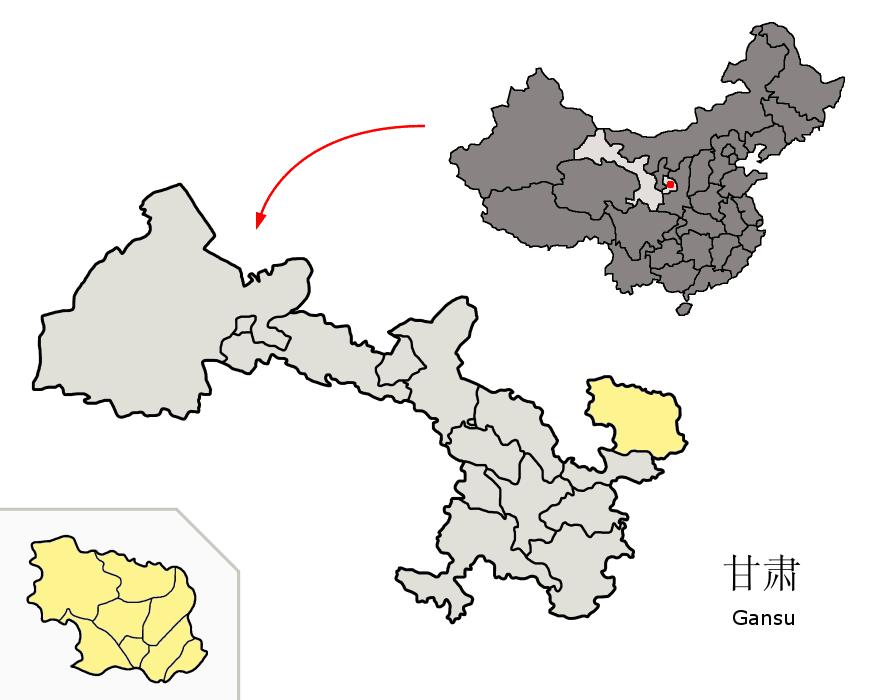
- Qingyang in Gansu
- Coordinates: 35°29′30″N 108°21′36″E
- Country: China
- Province: Gansu
- Prefecture-level city: Qingyang
- County seat: Shanhe

Area
  - Total: 1,319.5 km^{2} (509.5 sq mi)

Population (2018)
  - Total: 244,900
  - Density: 185.6/km^{2} (480.7/sq mi)
- Time zone: UTC+8 (China Standard)
- Postal code: 745300
- Website: www.zninfo.gov.cn

Zhengning County is a county in the east of Gansu province, China, bordering Shaanxi province to the east and south. It is under the administration of the prefecture-level city of Qingyang. Its postal code is 745300, and its population in 1999 was 225,043 people.

It was established in 420 AD during the Northern Wei dynasty as Yongzhou County. In 598 during the Sui dynasty it became Luochuan County, named after the county seat Luochuan. By the Tang dynasty it was named Zhenning County, and received the current name Zhengning during the Qing dynasty.

In 1635, rebel leader Li Zicheng fought a battle against Ming dynasty general Cao Wenzhao (zh:曹文诏) in Zhengning.

== Economy ==
Zhengning County's important agriculture products are tobacco, scallion and apples. It also has several coal mines. Locals also make wicker dustpans.

== Administrative divisions ==
Zhengning County is divided to 8 towns, 1 township and 1 ethnic township. The county government is located in Shanhe town. Until 1930, it was governed from Luochuan (35.3213°N 108.2125°E). In 2005 Luochuan was abolished as a township and placed under Yonghe town.

Towns

- Shanhe (山河镇)
- Yulinzi (榆林子镇)
- Gonghe (宫河镇)
- Yonghe (永和镇)
- Yongzheng (永正镇)
- Zhoujia (周家镇)
- Qiutou (湫头镇)
- Xipo (西坡镇)

Township

- Sanjia Township (三嘉乡)

Ethnic township

- Wuqingyuan Hui Ethnic Township (五顷原回族乡)

== Climate ==
Climate data for Zhengning, elevation 1,482 m (4,862 ft), (1991–2020 normals, extremes 1981–2010)
Month	Jan	Feb	Mar	Apr	May	Jun	Jul	Aug	Sep	Oct	Nov	Dec	Year
Record high °C (°F)	15.7 (60.3)	19.8 (67.6)	26.2 (79.2)	32.5 (90.5)	31.9 (89.4)	34.6 (94.3)	33.4 (92.1)	32.5 (90.5)	32.8 (91.0)	26.1 (79.0)	21.0 (69.8)	14.4 (57.9)	34.6 (94.3)
Mean daily maximum °C (°F)	1.2 (34.2)	4.7 (40.5)	10.5 (50.9)	17.3 (63.1)	21.4 (70.5)	25.2 (77.4)	26.4 (79.5)	24.8 (76.6)	20.1 (68.2)	14.6 (58.3)	8.6 (47.5)	2.8 (37.0)	14.8 (58.6)
Daily mean °C (°F)	−3.9 (25.0)	−0.5 (31.1)	4.9 (40.8)	11.3 (52.3)	15.7 (60.3)	19.8 (67.6)	21.4 (70.5)	19.9 (67.8)	15.3 (59.5)	9.5 (49.1)	3.4 (38.1)	−2.3 (27.9)	9.5 (49.2)
Mean daily minimum °C (°F)	−7.5 (18.5)	−4.2 (24.4)	0.7 (33.3)	6.3 (43.3)	10.7 (51.3)	14.9 (58.8)	17.2 (63.0)	16.0 (60.8)	11.6 (52.9)	5.6 (42.1)	−0.4 (31.3)	−5.9 (21.4)	5.4 (41.8)
Record low °C (°F)	−19.9 (−3.8)	−16.1 (3.0)	−13.0 (8.6)	−6.2 (20.8)	−0.9 (30.4)	6.0 (42.8)	9.2 (48.6)	6.5 (43.7)	1.6 (34.9)	−7.5 (18.5)	−17.9 (−0.2)	−21.5 (−6.7)	−21.5 (−6.7)
Average precipitation mm (inches)	7.1 (0.28)	9.9 (0.39)	18.7 (0.74)	38.5 (1.52)	55.4 (2.18)	77.9 (3.07)	127.7 (5.03)	119.1 (4.69)	90.8 (3.57)	53.0 (2.09)	18.0 (0.71)	5.1 (0.20)	621.2 (24.47)
Average precipitation days (≥ 0.1 mm)	4.8	5.5	7.1	7.7	9.5	11.3	13.5	12.7	11.5	9.4	6.1	4.0	103.1
Average snowy days	6.8	8.0	6.2	1.1	0.1	0	0	0	0	1.0	4.3	5.5	33
Average relative humidity (%)	54	55	53	51	55	60	72	76	75	70	61	54	61
Mean monthly sunshine hours	182.8	170.0	196.7	218.6	233.9	224.1	220.9	195.6	157.1	168.1	174.3	187.3	2,329.4
Percentage possible sunshine	58	55	53	55	54	52	50	47	43	49	57	62	53
Source: China Meteorological Administration

== See also ==
- List of administrative divisions of Gansu
