= Loosa =

Manchu Banner army commander

Šongkoro Baturu Loosa (Manchu: ᠯᠣᡠᠰᠠ, romanized: Loosa, LAW-Sah; d. 1641) was a Manchu military commander of the Gūwalgiya clan in Anculakū and a member of the Bordered Red Banner. He joined to Nurhaci during the early expansion of the Manchu Khanate. Throughout his career, he served as a banner commander at different levels, and deliberative minister, and was awarded the Manchu warrior title Šongkoro Baturu (Manchu: ᡧᠣᠩᡴᠣᡵᠣ
ᠪᠠᡨᡠᡵᡠ, Gyrfalcon Warrior) for his military achievements. He was killed in action during the Battle of Songshan-Jinzhou in 1641 and was posthumously honored with the hereditary title of Viscount Third-Class.

== Biography ==
Lausa participated in numerous campaigns under Nurhaci and Hong Taiji against the Ming dynasty, the Mongol tribes, and the Chahar Mongols. Due to his courage and battlefield leadership, he was selected as a commander of the elite forces Gabsihiyan, where he frequently led reconnaissance and assault operations. During the Siege of Dalinghe in 1631, he distinguished himself by rescuing besieged Qing officers and repeatedly defeating Ming forces. He later took part in campaigns against the Chahar Mongols and raids into the Ming frontier around Ningyuan and Jinzhou, earning consecutive promotions and the title of Baturu. In 1636, he served in the Qing invasion of Joseon, leading the forces of the front echelon into Korea. During the 1638 campaign against the Ming, he played a prominent role in the fighting at Qiangziling and was promoted to Baron Second-Class. In 1641, during the Battle of Songshan-Jinzhou, Loosa defeated the Ming commander Hong Chengchou's reinforcement army and participated in the capture of Jinzhou's outer defenses. Later that year, while serving under Dorgon in the decisive engagement against Ming forces, he was killed in combat. Hong Taiji subsequently ordered official sacrifices in his honor and posthumously awarded him the hereditary noble title of Viscount Third-Class. During the Shunzhi reign he was further honored with the posthumous name Zhongyi (忠毅, “Loyal and Resolute”).

Historical records held Loosa in exceptionally high regard, stating that:

Among those who served Emperor Taizu (Nurhaci) in the founding of the state, later assisted Emperor Taizong (Hong Taiji) in his campaigns, and ultimately sacrificed in battle, the merits of Loosa and Turusi were the greatest.
