= Battle of Shanhai Pass =

1644 battle in China

- Part of the Ming–Qing transition
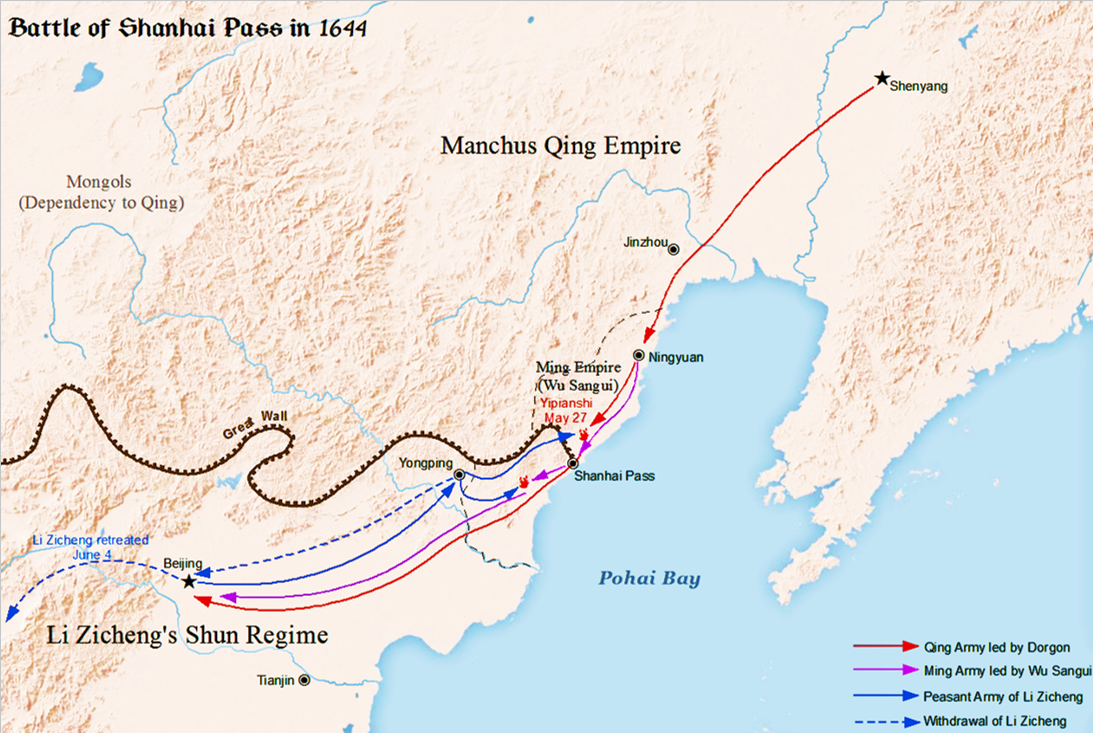
- Battle of Shanhai Pass
Date	May 27, 1644
Location	Shanhai Pass, China 39°58′44″N 119°46′32″E
Result	Qing victory

Belligerents
Qing dynasty Ming defenders of Shanhai Pass	Shun dynasty

Commanders and leaders
Dorgon; Wu Sangui	Li Zicheng

Strength
Qing: 60,000 men; Wu Sangui: about 100,000 men, including tens of thousands from local militia	Disputed: between 60,000 and 100,000 men

Casualties and losses
Unknown	Unknown

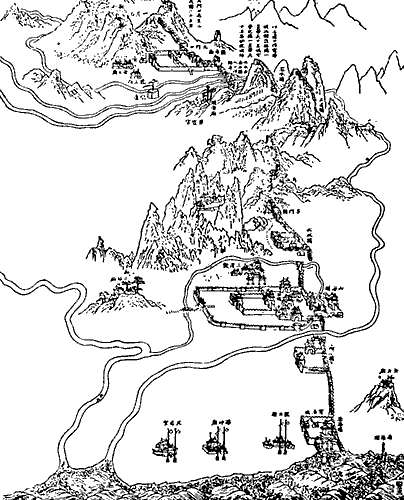
An old Chinese illustration of Battle of Shanhai Pass

The Battle of Shanhai Pass, fought on May 27, 1644 at Shanhai Pass at the eastern end of the Great Wall, was a decisive battle leading to the beginning of the Qing dynasty rule in China proper. There, the Qing prince-regent Dorgon allied with former Ming general Wu Sangui to defeat peasant rebel leader Li Zicheng, founder of the short-lived Shun dynasty, allowing Dorgon and the Qing army to rapidly conquer Beijing.

== Prelude ==
=== Rise of the Manchus ===
As the Ming dynasty declined, and the threat from northern enemies grew, Ming emperors saw the strategic value of Shanhai Pass and frequently garrisoned troops there, armies which sometimes reached up to 40,000 men. Under the rule of Hong Taiji (r. 1626–1643), the Qing were becoming more aggressive against the Ming. After an intermittent siege that lasted over ten years, Qing armies led by Jirgalang captured Songshan and Jinzhou in early 1642. The garrison of Ming general Wu Sangui in Ningyuan became the only major army standing between the Qing forces and the Ming capital in Beijing. In the summer of 1642, a Qing army managed to cross the Great Wall and ravaged northern China for seven months before withdrawing in May 1643, with prisoners and loot, without having fought any large Ming army.

In September 1643, Hong Taiji suddenly died without having named an heir. To avert a conflict between two strong contenders for succession – namely Hong Taiji's eldest son Hooge and Hong Taiji's agnate brother Dorgon, a proven military leader – a committee of Manchu princes chose to pass the throne to Hong Taiji's five-year-old son Fulin and appointed Dorgon and Jirgalang as co-regents. Because Jirgalang had no political ambition, Dorgon became the prime ruler of the Qing government.

=== Fall of Beijing ===
Just as Dorgon and his advisors were pondering how to attack the Ming, peasant rebellions were ravaging northern China and threatening the Ming capital of Beijing. In February 1644, rebel leader Li Zicheng founded the Shun dynasty in Xi'an and proclaimed himself king. In March, his armies captured the important city of Taiyuan in Shanxi.

Seeing the progress of the rebels, on April 5, the Ming Chongzhen Emperor (Zhu Youjian) requested the urgent help of any military commandant in the empire. Eager to secure the loyalty of his military elite, on April 11 he granted the title of "earl" to four generals, including Wu Sangui and Tang Tong (唐通). Tang Tong, the only one of these new earls who was then in Beijing, reorganized the capital's defenses and, with a eunuch named Du Xun (杜勳), went to fortify Juyong Pass, the last stronghold protecting the northern approach to Beijing. On April 22, the Ming court learned that Tang Tong had surrendered to Li Zicheng the day before and that the rebels' army was now in Changping, 65 kilometers northwest of Beijing.

Li and his army reached the suburbs of the capital on April 23. Instead of mounting a full-scale attack on the city walls, Li sent the recently surrendered eunuch Du Xun to see Emperor Zhu Youjian, hoping to secure his surrender. The emperor refused. On April 24 Li Zicheng breached the walls of Beijing, and the emperor hanged himself the next day on the Jingshan hill behind the Forbidden City. Zhu Youjian was the last Ming emperor to reign in Beijing.

=== Wu Sangui ===
Soon after the Emperor called for help, powerful Ming general Wu Sangui left his stronghold of Ningyuan north of the Great Wall and started marching toward the capital. On April 26, his armies had moved through the fortifications of Shanhai Pass (the eastern end of the Great Wall) and were marching toward Beijing when he heard that the city had fallen. He returned to Shanhai Pass. Li Zicheng sent two armies to attack the pass but Wu's battle-hardened troops defeated them easily on May 5 and 10. In order to secure his position, Li was determined to destroy Wu's army. On May 18 he personally led 60,000 troops out of Beijing to attack Wu. Meanwhile, Wu Sangui was writing to Dorgon to request the Qing's help in ousting the bandits and restoring the Ming dynasty.

Wu Sangui's departure from the stronghold of Ningyuan had left all territory outside the Great Wall under Qing control. Dorgon's Han Chinese advisors Hong Chengchou and Fan Wencheng (范文程) urged the Manchu prince to seize the opportunity of the fall of Beijing to claim the Mandate of Heaven for the Qing dynasty. Therefore, when Dorgon received Wu's letter, he was already leading an expedition to attack northern China and had no intention of restoring the Ming. Dorgon asked Wu to work for the Qing instead. Wu had little choice but to accept.

== Battle ==
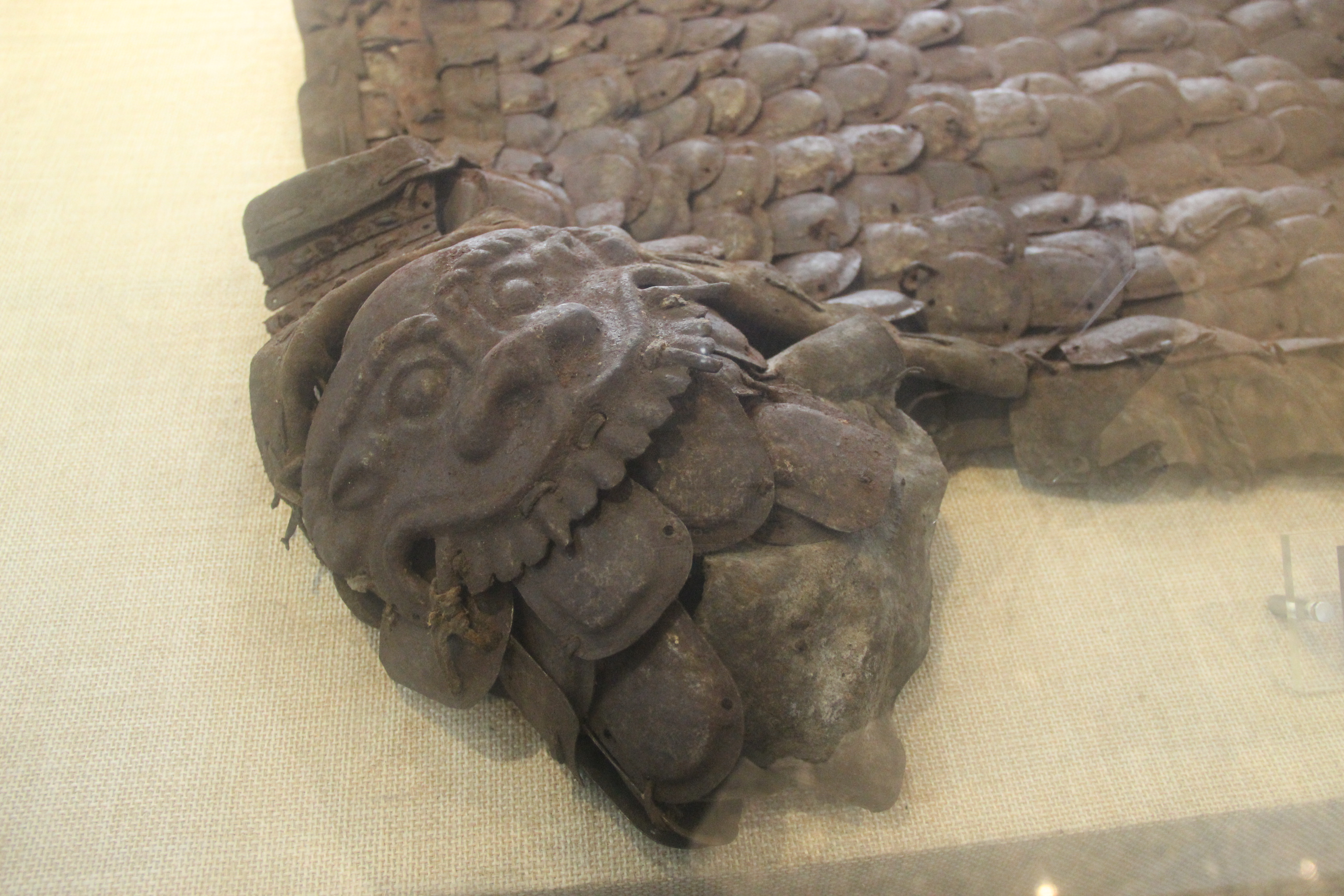
Qing dynasty lion-head shoulder guard and scale armour

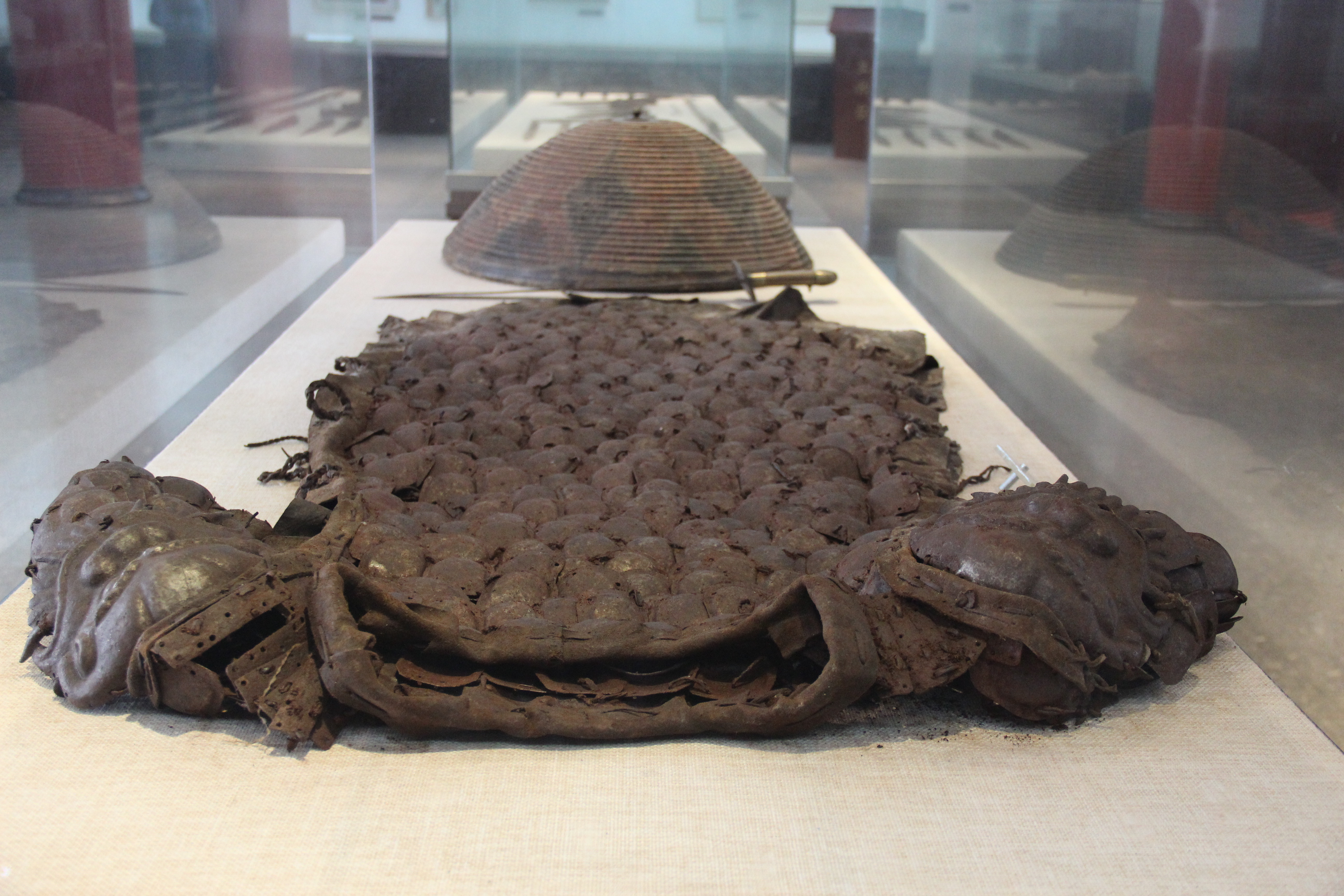
Qing scale armour with lion-head shoulder guards

=== Preparations for battle ===
On May 25, Li Zicheng deployed his men along the Sha River (沙河) a few kilometers west of the Shanhai Pass fortifications. He could observe the battlefield from a nearby hill, accompanied by two young Ming princes whom he had taken hostage. Wu Sangui assigned two trusted lieutenants to the defense of the northern and western walls of Shanhai Pass, and let gentry-led militia protect the eastern wall of the garrison. He then deployed his troops near Sha River to face Li Zicheng's army.

Also on May 25, Dorgon received a letter from Wu Sangui declaring that Wu was willing to surrender to the Qing in return for Dorgon's help in suppressing Li Zicheng's forces. Immediately setting his troops on a forced march toward Shanhai Pass, Dorgon and the Qing army quickly covered about 150 kilometers. On their way to Shanhai Pass, they ran into Tang Tong, who had been ordered to attack Wu Sangui from behind with a few hundred men. The forces of the former Ming general were virtually annihilated by the Qing army, and though Tang Tong managed to escape he soon surrendered to the Qing. At dusk on May 26, Dorgon's forces settled eight kilometers away from the Pass and slept in their armor until midnight, when they were awoken again to continue marching. Having instructed his brothers Ajige and Dodo to lead two wings of ten thousand men each to protect his flanks, Dorgon led his main force toward the Pass.

=== Battle ===
At dawn on May 27, the main Qing army reached the gates of Shanhai Pass, where Dorgon received Wu Sangui's formal surrender. Wu Sangui asked his men to attach pieces of white cloth to their back so that the Qing forces could tell them apart from the Shun rebels. Wu Sangui's forces were deployed in the vanguard and were ordered to charge the Shun army, but despite disorder in the Shun ranks, their defense line did not yield. Unable to break the rebels' line, Wu's troops suffered heavy casualties. Historian Frederic Wakeman claims that by the late afternoon, Wu Sangui's army was on the verge of defeat when a "violent sandstorm" started blowing on the battlefield.

Dorgon chose this moment to intervene: galloping around Wu's right flank, the Qing cavalry charged Li's left wing at Yipianshi ("Lone Rock", north of Shanhai Pass). When they saw mounted warriors with shaved foreheads rushing at them out of the storm, Shun troops broke their lines and fled. With their left wing shattered, the Shun army was routed; thousands of Shun soldiers were massacred as they retreated chaotically toward Yongping.

=== Number of troops ===
The number of troops that took part in the battle is unclear and has been disputed. Early Qing sources claim that Li Zicheng's army counted up to 200,000 men. However, Wakeman argues such sources tend to inflate the number of Li Zicheng's troops because they wanted to emphasize the Qing's military prowess against the Shun. Wakeman gives a figure of 60,000 men for Li's army, whereas Frederick Mote claims that Li had more than 100,000 troops under his command.

Assessments of Wu's forces range from 40,000 to 80,000, mounting to a total of about 100,000 when counting militia units. Wakeman claims that Wu's "regular army" counted 40,000 men, but that he commanded "50,000 troops of his own" and had managed to raise 50,000 men from local militia. Mote, on the other hand, states that Wu had 80,000 men garrisoned in Ningyuan when he left that city for Shanghaiguan in April 1644, and that 20,000 to 30,000 militiamen also came to him unsolicited the day of the battle of Shanhai Pass. Angela Hsi cites a contemporaneous source to argue that Wu led 40,000 troops ("one of the better military forces of the day") and that he was assisted by 70,000 residents of Liaodong (遼東), "who were reputed to be excellent fighters".

== Aftermath ==
On the evening of May 27, Li and his main army stayed at Yongping (永平) on the road to Beijing while many of his officers and soldiers fled toward the capital. On the next day he retreated toward Beijing, which he reached on May 31. He then let his troops loot the capital's official residences and government bureaus. On June 3, as a "final gesture of defiance" after his decisive defeat, Li officially declared himself Emperor of the Great Shun at the Wuying Palace (武英殿). After 42 days in Beijing, Li Zicheng set the imperial palace complex on fire and abandoned the capital to flee toward the west. The Beijing population then massacred nearly two thousand rebels who had not fled.

On June 5, the Beijing population prepared to welcome those who had defeated Li Zicheng. The elders and officials who went out of the city expecting to greet Wu Sangui and the Ming heir apparent were shocked when the leader of the victorious army turned out to be Prince Regent Dorgon of the Qing. Dorgon and his retinue rode to Donghua Gate (東華門), an eastern gate to the Forbidden City, to receive the imperial regalia; Dorgon was then escorted to Wuying Palace by the former Ming imperial bodyguards, who had previously submitted to Li Zicheng but now vowed to serve the Qing. Dorgon welcomed the Shunzhi Emperor to Beijing on October 19. The young monarch was officially enthroned as Emperor of China on November 8, 1644, marking the moment when the Qing seized the Mandate of Heaven.

On May 28, Wu Sangui's Ming title of Pingxi Earl (平西伯) was raised to Pingxi Prince (平西王). His troops shaved their heads and joined the main Qing forces. Very soon after entering Beijing, Dorgon despatched Wu and his troops to pursue Li Zicheng. Wu managed to engage Li's rearguard many times, but Li still managed to cross Guangu pass of the Great Wall into Shanxi; Wu then broke pursuit to return to Beijing. Li then reestablished a power base in Xi'an (Shaanxi province), where he had declared the foundation of his Shun dynasty in February 1644.

After repressing revolts against Qing rule in Hebei and Shandong in the Summer and Fall of 1644, in October of that year Dorgon sent several armies to extirpate Li Zicheng from his Shaanxi stronghold. Qing armies led by Ajige, Dodo, and Shi Tingzhu (石廷柱) won consecutive engagements against Shun forces in Shanxi and Shaanxi, forcing Li Zicheng to leave his Xi'an headquarters in February 1645. Li retreated through several provinces until he was killed in September 1645, either by his own hand or by a self-defense peasant group. Li's wife Gao Guiying and many rebels went south to aid the southern Ming regime against the Manchu invasion.

The Qing conquest of China lasted for several more decades. Resistance to Qing rule was intensified by the "haircutting command" on July 21, 1645, which forced all Chinese men to adopt the clothing of the Manchus and shave their forehead, leaving their remaining hair tied into a queue. Zhu Youlang, the last emperor of the Southern Ming, was killed by Wu Sangui in 1662. Wu Sangui was given a large territory in the southwest China, where he ruled for the Qing as a local feudal lord until he was recalled to Beijing in 1673. He and three other governors then rose in rebellion against the Qing. Though Wu died in 1678, the rebellion of the Three Feudatories lasted until 1681. In 1683 the Kangxi Emperor (r. 1662–1722) defeated the forces of Koxinga, the leader of the last Ming restoration movement. After this period of solidification, the Qing controlled China until 1912.

== Timeline ==
The battle of Shanhai Pass took place on May 27, 1644, but it was preceded and followed by a series of events that gave the battle a special historical significance. This timeline presents these events. All the dates are in 1644.

- February 8: on New Year's Day, Li Zicheng founds the "Great Shun" dynasty in Xi'an and proclaims himself King (wang 王).
- February 17: Jirgalang willingly yields control of all official matters to his co-regent Dorgon.
- March 5: Dorgon sends an amicable letter to Li Zicheng proposing that they "devise a plan in common to unite their forces" against the Ming.
- March 17: personally led by Li Zicheng, the Shun army captures Taiyuan (Shanxi) and executes high officials and members of the imperial family.
- April 5: seeing the progress of rebel armies in north China, the Chongzhen Emperor issues a call for the immediate help of any military commandant in the empire.
- April 6: Wu Sangui, a powerful Ming general, is ordered to move his forces from the fortified city of Ningyuan to Shanhai Pass (at the eastern end of the Great Wall), where it could better protect the capital. The transfer of troops, done by boat from a port in Liaoxi (遼西), would take ten days to complete. Wu's departure from Ningyuan, where Ming armies had defeated Qing founder Nurhaci in 1626, leaves all territory outside the Great Wall under Qing control.
- April 11: desperate to secure proper military support, the Chongzhen emperor names Wu Sangui, Tang Tong (唐通), and two other generals earls (bo 伯). Wu thus becomes "Earl who Pacified the West" (pingxi bo 平西伯). Tang Tong, the only earl who was then in Beijing, reorganizes the capital's defenses and goes to post himself at the Juyong Pass, the last fortification defending the northern approach to Beijing.
- April 21: Li Zicheng's northern army reaches Juyong Pass; Tang Tong surrenders without a fight.
- April 22: Li Zicheng captures Changping on the northern outskirts of Beijing; he burns some of Ming imperial tombs. The Chongzhen court hears that Tang Tong surrendered the day before.
- April 23: Li Zicheng's army reaches the western suburbs of Beijing and starts attacking the city walls. Li does not order a full-scale assault because he hopes the emperor will surrender.
- April 24: a eunuch opens one of the city gates to Li Zicheng's troops. Li's men quickly overrun the southern city.
- April 25: the Chongzhen Emperor commits suicide on a hill behind the Forbidden City.
- April 26: having reached Fengrun (豐潤) halfway to the capital from Shanhai Pass, Wu Sangui hears that the capital has fallen; he returns to fortify Shanhai Pass.
- May 3: Li Zicheng sends the recently surrendered general Tang Tong to attack Wu Sangui at Shanhai Pass.
- May 5: Wu Sangui routs Tang Tong's army.
- May 10: Tang Tong's defeated army returns toward Shanhai Pass with reinforcements led by Bai Guang'en (白廣恩), but their joint army is again defeated by Wu Sangui.
- May 13: words reach the Qing capital of Mukden that Li Zicheng has been brutalizing former Ming officials and the population of Beijing. Grand Secretary Fan Wencheng (范文程) uses these news to argue for a Qing intervention in China. Dorgon agrees to mount a military expedition to punish the rebels and occupy the Central Plains.
- May 14: Dorgon leads the Qing "Grand Army" out of Mukden and starts marching south toward the Great Wall.
- May 18: after the defeat of two of his armies a few days earlier, Li Zicheng leaves Beijing with a large army to take Shanhai Pass himself.
- May 20: two of Wu Sangui's lieutenants arrive at Dorgon's camp at the Liao River carrying a message asking the Manchus to help Wu defeat Li Zicheng's bandits and restore the Ming dynasty in return for "great profits" (大利). Later that day the Manchus hear for the first time that the Chongzhen emperor was dead. Dorgon sends a letter back to Wu Sangui asking Wu to surrender to the Qing in exchange for help in destroying the Shun rebels. Still on that day, but as a result of earlier plans, small groups of Qing troops start to cross the Great Wall to distribute written proclamations announcing that the Qing will not harm the population and will only kill Li Zicheng's bandits.
- May 25: Dorgon receives a letter confirming that Wu Sangui has accepted to work for the Qing: he takes his army on a forced march toward Shanhai Pass. By the same date, Li Zicheng's army is already camping in the outskirts of Shanhai Pass, near the Sha River a few kilometers west of the Shanhai Pass garrison; Wu Sangui sends his troops to confront him there.
- May 26: having covered more than 150 kilometers in 24 hours, Dorgon's troops settle eight kilometers away from the Pass to rest for a few hours. They are awoken at midnight to continue marching.
- May 27: Battle of Shanhai Pass.
- May 28: Li Zicheng retreats from Yongping toward Beijing. Dorgon raises Wu Sangui from Earl to Prince; Wu's remaining troops shave their heads and join the Qing forces.
- May 31: Li Zicheng reenters Beijing with his troops, which proceed to loot the capital.
- June 3: Li Zicheng officially declares himself Emperor of the Great Shun.
- June 4: after six weeks in Beijing, Li Zicheng sets the imperial palaces on fire and abandons the capital to flee toward the west. The Beijing population massacres Shun stragglers.
- June 5: led by Dorgon, Qing troops are welcomed into the capital; the Beijing population is shocked because it was expecting Wu Sangui to bring back the Ming heir apparent.
- October 19: the Shunzhi Emperor arrives in Beijing through the Zhengyang Gate, where he is welcomed by Dorgon.
- November 8: a formal ritual of enthronement is held for the six-year-old Emperor: he is now Emperor of China.
