= Libnotes =

Scientific classification
- Kingdom: Animalia
- Phylum: Arthropoda
- Clade: Pancrustacea
- Class: Insecta
- Order: Diptera
- Family: Limoniidae
- Subfamily: Limnophilinae
- Genus: Libnotes; Westwood, 1876

Type species
- Libnotes thwaitesiana Westwood, 1876

Subgenera
- Afrolimonia Alexander, 1965; Goniodineura van der Wulp, 1895; Gressittomyia Alexander, 1936; Laosa Edwards, 1926; Libnotes Westwood, 1876; Metalibnotes Alexander, 1972; Paralibnotes Alexander, 1972

Genus of flies

Libnotes is a genus of crane fly in the family Limoniidae.

== Distribution ==
The genus is primarily found in Africa, and Asia.

== Species ==
- Subgenus Afrolimonia Alexander, 1965

- L. angustilamina (Alexander, 1956)
- L. basilewskyi (Alexander, 1962)
- L. buxtoniana (Alexander, 1956)
- L. comoreana (Alexander, 1959)
- L. crassibasis (Alexander, 1975)
- L. discobolina (Edwards, 1923)
- L. discobolodes (Alexander, 1974)
- L. dispar (Lindner, 1958)
- L. ditior (Alexander, 1946)
- L. familiaris (Speiser, 1923)
- L. igalensis (Alexander, 1937)
- L. illiterata (Alexander, 1937)
- L. imperspicua (Alexander, 1929)
- L. indra (Alexander, 1968)
- L. irrorata (Enderlein, 1912)
- L. joanae (Alexander, 1975)
- L. ladogensis (Lackschewitz, 1940)
- L. lophema (Alexander, 1958)
- L. loveridgei (Alexander, 1937)
- L. lucrativa (Alexander, 1956)
- L. nigricaulis (Alexander, 1956)
- L. nyasaensis (Alexander, 1920)
- L. obuduensis (Alexander, 1976)
- L. oligacantha (Alexander, 1956)
- L. oligospilota (Alexander, 1937)
- L. omnifulva (Alexander, 1957)
- L. oresitropha (Speiser, 1909)
- L. plutonis (Alexander, 1924)
- L. poecila (Alexander, 1920)
- L. praetor (Alexander, 1945)
- L. rhanteria (Alexander, 1920)
- L. rhizosema (Speiser, 1909)
- L. shawi (Alexander, 1921)
- L. sokotrana (Alexander, 1920)
- L. subapicalis (Alexander, 1930)
- L. trunculata (Alexander, 1976)
- L. uniflava (Riedel, 1914)
- L. vilhelmi (Alexander, 1924)

- Subgenus Goniodineura van der Wulp, 1895

- L. acrophaea (Alexander, 1930)
- L. apicifusca (Alexander, 1978)
- L. apsellia (Alexander, 1978)
- L. banahaoensis (Alexander, 1929)
- L. bellula (Alexander, 1931)
- L. cerinella (Alexander, 1978)
- L. circumscripta (Alexander, 1934)
- L. clauda (Alexander, 1937)
- L. clitelligera (Alexander, 1929)
- L. delicatior (Alexander, 1940)
- L. ephippiata (Alexander, 1936)
- L. erythromera (Alexander, 1935)
- L. familiaris Osten Sacken, 1882
- L. forcipata de Meijere, 1911
- L. hassenana (Alexander, 1930)
- L. hopkinsi Edwards, 1928
- L. imbellis (Alexander, 1924)
- L. immetata (Alexander, 1935)
- L. indica (Brunetti, 1912)
- L. kraussiana (Alexander, 1972)
- L. lacrimula (Alexander, 1956)
- L. lantauensis (Alexander, 1938)
- L. luteithorax (Alexander, 1937)
- L. magnisiva (Alexander, 1968)
- L. malaitae (Alexander, 1978)
- L. melancholica (Alexander, 1931)
- L. montivagans Alexander, 1915
- L. neofamiliaris (Alexander, 1931)
- L. nepalica (Alexander, 1958)
- L. nesopicta (Alexander, 1940)
- L. nigriceps (van der Wulp, 1895)
- L. nigricornis Alexander, 1915
- L. novaebrittanicae (Alexander, 1924)
- L. parvistigma Alexander, 1920
- L. perluteola (Alexander, 1972)
- L. perparvula (Alexander, 1931)
- L. perparvuloides (Alexander, 1935)
- L. phaeonota (Alexander, 1940)
- L. phaeozoma (Alexander, 1972)
- L. pictoides (Alexander, 1972)
- L. rarissima (Alexander, 1934)
- L. signaticollis (van der Wulp, 1895)
- L. siva (Alexander, 1971)
- L. subfamiliaris (Alexander, 1931)
- L. unistriolata (Alexander, 1931)
- L. veitchi (Alexander, 1924)
- L. viridula (Alexander, 1922)

- Subgenus Gressittomyia Alexander, 1936

- L. xenoptera (Alexander, 1936)

- Subgenus Laosa Edwards, 1926

- L. bipartita (Alexander, 1936)
- L. charmosyne (Alexander, 1958)
- L. diphragma (Alexander, 1934)
- L. dolonigra (Alexander, 1956)
- L. falcata (Alexander, 1935)
- L. fuscinervis Brunetti, 1912
- L. impensa (Alexander, 1967)
- L. innuba (Alexander, 1941)
- L. iris (Alexander, 1950)
- L. joculator (Alexander, 1959)
- L. kariyana (Alexander, 1947)
- L. manobo (Alexander, 1931)
- L. noctipes (Alexander, 1967)
- L. pavo (Alexander, 1964)
- L. regalis Edwards, 1916
- L. riedelella (Alexander, 1934)
- L. rotundifolialeos (Young, 1990)
- L. suffalcata (Alexander, 1964)
- L. taficola (Alexander, 1948)
- L. transversalis de Meijere, 1916

- Subgenus Libnotes Westwood, 1876

- L. adicia (Alexander, 1948)
- L. alexanderi Edwards, 1925
- L. alternimacula (Alexander, 1962)
- L. amatrix (Alexander, 1922)
- L. aptata (Alexander, 1949)
- L. archboldeana (Alexander, 1959)
- L. astuta (Alexander, 1932)
- L. atroguttata (Edwards, 1932)
- L. augustana (Alexander, 1978)
- L. aurantiaca (Doleschall, 1859)
- L. basistrigata (Alexander, 1934)
- L. buruicola (Alexander, 1942)
- L. carbonipes (Alexander, 1930)
- L. chrysophaea (Alexander, 1934)
- L. citrivena (Alexander, 1938)
- L. clintoni (Alexander, 1936)
- L. colossus (Alexander, 1971)
- L. comissabunda (Alexander, 1935)
- L. consona (Alexander, 1936)
- L. crocea (Edwards, 1916)
- L. depicta (Alexander, 1942)
- L. diaphana (Alexander, 1942)
- L. divaricata (Alexander, 1924)
- L. djampangensis (Alexander, 1934)
- L. duyagi (Alexander, 1929)
- L. eboracensis (Alexander, 1935)
- L. elachista (Alexander, 1971)
- L. elata (Alexander, 1931)
- L. elissa (Alexander, 1947)
- L. falsa (Alexander, 1935)
- L. fastosa (Alexander, 1959)
- L. ferruginata Edwards, 1926
- L. flavipalpis Edwards, 1926
- L. fuscicoxata (Edwards, 1932)
- L. garoensis (Alexander, 1921)
- L. grammoneura (Alexander, 1962)
- L. greeni Edwards, 1928
- L. greenwoodi Alexander, 1924
- L. griseola (Alexander, 1934)
- L. henrici (Alexander, 1932)
- L. hollandi (Alexander, 1936)
- L. howensis Alexander, 1922
- L. igorata (Alexander, 1929)
- L. illecebrosa (Alexander, 1930)
- L. imponens (Walker, 1859)
- L. impressa (Walker, 1856)
- L. inattenta (Alexander, 1967)
- L. infumosa Savchenko, 1983
- L. innotabilis (Walker, 1864)
- L. inusitata Edwards, 1927
- L. invicta (Alexander, 1964)
- L. ishana (Alexander, 1967)
- L. kaulbackiana (Alexander, 1963)
- L. kinabaluana (Edwards, 1933)
- L. klossi Alexander, 1927
- L. kusaiensis (Alexander, 1940)
- L. laetinota (Alexander, 1963)
- L. laterospinosa (Alexander, 1972)
- L. libnotina (Alexander, 1934)
- L. limpida Edwards, 1916
- L. longinervis (Brunetti, 1912)
- L. longistigma Alexander, 1921
- L. luteiventris Edwards, 1926
- L. majorina (Alexander, 1972)
- L. marginalis Bezzi, 1916
- L. megalops Edwards, 1926
- L. minyneura (Alexander, 1978)
- L. muscicola (Alexander, 1942)
- L. neopleuralis (Alexander, 1964)
- L. neosolicita (Alexander & Alexander, 1973)
- L. nerissa (Alexander, 1959)
- L. nigerrima (Alexander, 1934)
- L. nohirai Alexander, 1918
- L. notata van der Wulp, 1878
- L. notatinervis Brunetti, 1912
- L. onobana (Alexander, 1936)
- L. opaca Bezzi, 1916
- L. oralis Edwards, 1928
- L. palaeta (Alexander, 1942)
- L. perkinsi (Grimshaw, 1901)
- L. perplexa (Alexander, 1951)
- L. perrara (Alexander, 1931)
- L. philemon (Alexander, 1962)
- L. pilulifera (Edwards, 1933)
- L. plomleyi (Alexander, 1937)
- L. poeciloptera Osten Sacken, 1881
- L. praeculta (Alexander, 1959)
- L. pramatha (Alexander, 1965)
- L. puella Alexander, 1925
- L. punctatinervis Edwards, 1928
- L. punctatissima de Meijere, 1915
- L. punctithorax (Brunetti, 1918)
- L. quadrifurca (Walker, 1861)
- L. quadriplagiata Alexander, 1932
- L. quinquecostata (Alexander, 1936)
- L. quinquegeminata (Alexander, 1950)
- L. recta (Edwards, 1928)
- L. rectangula (Riedel, 1921)
- L. recurvinervis (Alexander, 1930)
- L. regina Alexander, 1920
- L. restricta Alexander, 1924
- L. riverai (Alexander, 1929)
- L. rufata (Edwards, 1931)
- L. rufula (Alexander, 1962)
- L. sabroskyi (Alexander, 1972)
- L. sackenina (Alexander, 1929)
- L. sappho (Alexander, 1943)
- L. scoliacantha (Alexander, 1972)
- L. scutellata Edwards, 1916
- L. semperi Osten Sacken, 1882
- L. sharva (Alexander, 1965)
- L. simplicicercus (Alexander, 1967)
- L. soembana (Edwards, 1932)
- L. stantoni Edwards, 1916
- L. strigivena (Walker, 1861)
- L. subamatrix (Alexander, 1960)
- L. subfasciatula (Oosterbroek, 1986)
- L. subocellata (Alexander, 1959)
- L. subopaca Alexander, 1923
- L. sumatrana Edwards, 1919
- L. suttoni (Alexander, 1935)
- L. tartarus (Alexander, 1965)
- L. termitina Osten Sacken, 1882
- L. terraereginae Alexander, 1922
- L. thwaitesiana Westwood, 1876
- L. thyestes (Alexander, 1950)
- L. tibiocincta (Alexander, 1964)
- L. trifasciata Edwards, 1928
- L. trisignata (Walker, 1865)
- L. tritincta (Brunetti, 1918)
- L. trukensis (Alexander, 1972)
- L. tszi (Alexander, 1949)
- L. undulata Matsumura, 1916
- L. univibrissa (Alexander, 1967)
- L. viridicolor (Alexander, 1962)
- L. vitiana (Alexander, 1956)
- L. willowsi (Alexander, 1936)
- L. xanthoneura (Alexander, 1953)
- L. zelota (Alexander, 1933)

- Subgenus Metalibnotes Alexander, 1972

- L. beardsleyi (Alexander, 1972)
- L. caledoniana (Alexander, 1978)
- L. delandi (Alexander, 1934)
- L. edgari (Alexander, 1972)
- L. fijiensis (Alexander, 1914)
- L. hebridensis Edwards, 1927
- L. jocularis (Alexander, 1940)
- L. knighti (Alexander, 1978)
- L. orofenaae (Alexander, 1947)
- L. perhyalina (Alexander, 1973)
- L. persetosa (Alexander, 1956)
- L. semiermis (Alexander, 1921)
- L. sentifera (Alexander, 1972)
- L. tongana (Alexander, 1978)
- L. toxopei (Edwards, 1926)
- L. veitchiana Edwards, 1924
- L. watti (Alexander, 1973)

- Subgenus Paralibnotes Alexander, 1972

- L. biprotensa (Alexander, 1972)
- L. immaculipennis Senior-White, 1922
- L. manni Alexander, 1924
- L. obliqua Alexander, 1922
- L. samoensis Alexander, 1921
- L. subaequalis Alexander, 1921

- Subgenus Paralibnotes Alexander, 1972

- L. bidentata (Skuse, 1890)
- L. bidentoides (Alexander, 1972)
- L. brunettii (Alexander, 1921)
- L. centralis (Brunetti, 1912)
- L. mopsa (Alexander, 1934)
