= Bašitai =

Bašitai (Manchu: ᡨᡠ᠋ᡵᡠᠰᡳ, romanized: bašitai, d. 1652) was a Manchu nobleman of the Plain Yellow Banner and a member of the Irgen Gioro clan (alternatively recorded as the Šušu Gioro clan). He was the eldest son of Šongkoro Baturu Turusi.

== Biography ==
In 1634, Bašitai inherited his father's hereditary title and was appointed a First-Class Imperial Guard (一等侍衛). Between 1650 and 1652, he received promotions on three occasions following imperial acts of amnesty and celebration, eventually attaining the hereditary rank of First-Class Viscount (一等子爵). He also served as Chief of the Imperial Guards (侍衛領班). In 1652, an Imperial Guard of Mongol heritage named Soni allegedly plotted to assassinate the Shunzhi Emperor. Fearing Bašitai's loyalty and bravery, Soni arranged Bašitai's murder first before carrying out the plot. The Shunzhi Emperor deeply mourned Bašitai's death and issued a special edict posthumously elevating him to the rank of Third-Class Marquis (三等侯爵). His hereditary title was subsequently inherited by his son Juladai.
