= Turusi =

Manchu Banner army commander

Šongkoro Baturu Turusi (Manchu: ᡨᡠ᠋ᡵᡠᠰᡳ, romanized: Turusi, died 1634) was a Manchu military commander of the Plain Yellow Banner, belonging to the Irgen Gioro clan (alternatively recorded as the Šušu Gioro clan). In the service of the Manchu Khanate, he was frequently appointed as commander of frontline or elite reconnaissance forces Gabsihiyan and regarded as a “Champion of Valor” (驍勇冠軍), thus earning himself a Manchu warrior title Šongkoro Baturu (Manchu: ᡧᠣᠩᡴᠣᡵᠣ
ᠪᠠᡨᡠᡵᡠ, Gyrfalcon Warrior).

== Biography ==
Turusi joined Nurhaci's campaign along with his younger brother Fiyanggū from Yehe. In 1624, he was appointed a nirui janggin. Due to his success in pursuing deserters and suppressing banditry, he was promoted the following year to jalan i janggin and was granted the hereditary rank of adaha hafan.

In 1629, during the reign of Hong Taiji, Turusi accompanied the Qing campaign against the Ming dynasty and served as a frontline commander. During the Jisi Incident and the operations around Beijing, he proposed a raid at night against a Ming force of more than 40,000 troops stationed about 2 km south of Yongding Gate (永定門), and personally led it, being the first to break into the enemy garrison. His force killed the Ming commanders Man Gui and Sun Zushou (孫祖壽) in action, and captured the commanders Hei Yunlong (黑雲龍) and Ma Dengyun (麻登雲), thereby earning great distinction. In the following year (1630), Turusi was a part of Prince Abatai and Jirgalang's campaign against the rebel commander Liu Xingzuo (劉興祚), who was subsequently killed in battle. He later remained in defense of Yongping(永平) under Prince Amin. When a large Ming counteroffensive operation was launched, however, Amin abandoned Yongping and withdrew, while Turusi broke through the siege and retreated beyond Shanhai Pass (山海關).

In 1631, during the Battle of Dalinghe, Turusi defeated a Ming relief force commanded by the supervisory commissioner Zhang Chun (張春) and captured Zhang alive. He subsequently participated in the campaign against the Chahar Mongols, where he distinguished himself by persuading Mongol refugees and tribesmen to surrender. In 1634, he was promoted to commander of the Gabušiyan, the elite recon force of the Manchu Banner Army. In the seventh month of that year, Turusi led his troops in an attack on Datong, defeating the troops of the Ming commanders Cao Wenzhao and Zu Dabi (祖大弼). Later, while conducting reconnaissance in preparation for an assault on Xuanfu (宣府), he encountered scouts under Zu Dabi's command. Although struck in the abdomen by an arrow, Turusi killed two enemy scouts in the battle and captured thirteen others before withdrawing. Hong Taiji personally visited him and the wound proved severe. Turusi soon died from his injuries. Hong Taiji posthumously awarded him the hereditary title of Third-Class Viscount (三等子爵), and during the Shunzhi reign he was further honored with the posthumous name Zhongxuan (忠宣, “Loyal and Proclamatory”).

Historical records held Turusi in exceptionally high regard, stating that:

Among those who served Emperor Taizu (Nurhaci) in the founding of the state, later assisted Emperor Taizong (Hong Taiji) in his campaigns, and ultimately sacrificed in battle, the merits of Loosa and Turusi were the greatest.

Turusi's eldest son, Bašitai, inherited his father's title and later served as Chief of the Imperial Guards under the Shunzhi Emperor. His younger brother Fiyanggū rose to the Grand Minister of Imperial Guards and was ennobled as a Second-Class Baron (二等男爵).
