= Fiyanggū (Irgen Gioro) =

Fiyangū (Manchu: ᡶᡳᠶᠠᠩᡤᡡ, romanized: fiyanggū, ?-?) was a Manchu official and nobleman of the Plain Yellow Banner, belonging to the Irgen Gioro clan (also Šušu Gioro clan). He was the younger brother of Šongkoro Baturu Turusi.

== Biography ==
Fiyanggū was initially appointed as a nirui janggin with responsibilities for the administration of imperial pastures and the organization of hunting expeditions. In 1645, having served for many years and earned a reputation for capable administration, he was granted a hereditary niru commandership (佐領世職). Between 1650 and 1652, he received promotions on three occasions following imperial acts of amnesty and celebration, eventually attaining the hereditary rank of Adaha hafan Second-Class. In 1654, in recognition of his meritorious supervision and management of the imperial pastures, Fiyanggū was ennobled as a Baron Second-Class (二等男爵). He later rose to the office of Grand Minister of Imperial Guard (内大臣). However, little is known about his later life afterwards in the official records.
