= Hong Chengchou =

Chinese general and official (1593–1665)

Third Class adaha hafan Hong Chengchou
- 洪承疇

Grand Secretary of the Wuying Hall
- In office 1658–1661

Grand Secretary of the Palace Academy for the Advancement of Literature
- In office 1653–1658

Grand Secretary of the Palace Secretariat Academy
- In office 1644–1653

Viceroy of Ji–Liao
- In office 1639–1641
- Preceded by: Wu Aheng (viceroy of Ji–Liao–Baoding)
- Succeeded by: Yang Shengwu

Personal details
- Born: 16 October 1593 Nan'an, Fujian, Ming China
- Died: April 3, 1665 (aged 71) Nan'an, Fujian, Qing China
- Education: jinshi degree in the Imperial Examination
- Occupation: Official
- Courtesy name: Yanyan (彥演)
- Art name: Hengjiu (亨九)
- Posthumous name: Wenxiang (文襄)

Hong Chengchou (Chinese: 洪承疇; Pe̍h-ōe-jī: Âng Sîng-tiû; 1593–1665), courtesy name Yanyan and art name Hengjiu, was a Chinese official who served under the Ming and Qing dynasties. He was born in present-day Liangshan Village, Yingdu Town, Fujian Province, China. After obtaining the position of a jinshi (進士; successful candidate) in the imperial examination in 1616 during the reign of the Wanli Emperor, he joined the civil service of the Ming Empire and served as an official in Shaanxi. During the reign of the Chongzhen Emperor (r. 1627–1644), he was promoted to Supreme Commander of Shaanxi, Shanxi, Henan, Huguang, and Sichuan; Minister of War, and later on, Governor-General of Jiliao (薊遼; an area which included parts of present-day Shandong, Hebei and Tianjin).

In 1642, Hong surrendered and defected to the Manchu-led Qing Empire after his defeat at the Battle of Song-Jin. He became one of the Qing Empire's leading Han Chinese scholar-politicians, and one of the architects of the Manchu conquest of China. While he was in office, he encouraged the Manchu rulers to adopt Han Chinese culture and provided advice to the Qing government on how to consolidate its control over the former territories of the fallen Ming Empire, as well as having an active role in the conquest of South China. Apart from Dorgon and Fan Wencheng (范文程), Hong was regarded as one of the most influential politicians in the early Qing dynasty, but his legacy became controversial for his defection to the Qing Empire and for his suppression of the Southern Ming dynasty (a short-lived state formed by remnants of the fallen Ming Empire).

== Early life and service under the Ming Dynasty ==
=== Early service under the Ming Dynasty against the peasant rebellions ===
When he was young and preparing for his future career as an official, he was strictly tutored by a man called Zhang Xianmo, who likely introduced him to the study of military classics, something that would become important later in his career. When he received the jinshi degree in 1616, he was made an official of the Ministry of Justice in the capital, where he remained for six years. During the 1620s he rapidly ascended in the administrative hierarchy, until he was transferred to Shaanxi in 1627 as Administration Vice Commissioner in charge of the Tax Intendant Circuit, although he became embroiled in the suppression of the ongoing rebellions in the province.

In 1629 he became formally assigned to the military administration of the province, and displayed promising skills dealing with a number of rebel attacks. Because of his performance, he was named Assistant Censor-in-Chief and Grand Coordinator of Yansui in late 1629, and achieved a number of successes in the field against Wang Jiayin and one of the future major rebels, Zhang Xiangzhong, pacifying most of Yansui. He was eventually made Supreme Commander of the Three Border Regions in 1631 to substitute Yang He, who was repeatedly found to not be up to the task. In 1632, he and one of the most able Ming field commanders, Cao Wenzhao, killed several bandit leaders, including Ke Tianfei, Lighted Lamp and Heaven-Disturbing Monkey. In the following years he scored even more successes, either destroying or forcing to flee from Shaanxi every major rebel group.

In 1634, with rebellions on the rise once more, the court felt it needed Hong's services as a field commander, and Chen Qiyu was appointed Supreme Commander of Shaanxi, Shanxi, Henan, Huguang and Sichuan instead. Hong, along with Cao Wenzhao and He Renlong, bottled up several large groups of rebels at Chexiang Gorge in summer of 1634, including major figures like Li Zicheng, Zhang Xianzhong or Gao Yingxiang. However, Chen Qiyu's subordinates were bribed by the rebels and they convinced Chen to accept their surrender instead of massacring them. Soon after, they rebelled again and continued their activities. After this debacle Chen Qiyu was demoted and Hong Chengchou appointed to his position, giving him command over all military forces in the area affected by the rebellions. Hong Chengchou adopted the following strategy:

We should have an effective plan to deal with the rebels. We went to Honan and the rebels fled to Shensi. When we arrived in Shensi, the rebels again ran off to Hupei and Honan. The situation is such that we trap ourselves on the roads and all the countryside is ruined. The emperor promulgated a strict edict setting a time limit to wipe out the rebels. Now, we will demarcate an area to hold and defend and thus restrict the movement of the rebels. I will personally lead the troops to engage them directly until there is not one left.

Fundamentally, Hong deployed troops in strategic passes and along the Han River to contain the rebels in one area, while a field force engaged and eliminated them. While Hong's deployment was considered as excellent and he was able to obtain various military victories over the rebels in the field, including defeating numerous times and finally killing Gao Yingxiang in 1636, these continued their activities in 1635 and 1636. In particular, 1635 was very eventful for the rebels as they sacked Fengyang, where the founder of the Ming dynasty was buried, and other towns. However, strict time limits set by the emperor Chongzhen forced Hong and the Ming forces to be more aggressive and reckless to make faster progress, which eventually caused casualties and able officers like Cao Wenzhao were killed in ambushes. Ming forces in the area were pretty limited in comparison with the number of rebel groups and the area they had to cover: only 42,000 were available, of which most were on garrison duties, leaving some 6,000 men for field operations.

In 1637, Yang Sichang became Minister of War and convinced the emperor to follow his agenda to deal with the rebels. Showing animosity for Hong, he convinced the emperor to establish unrealistic time limits for his campaigns, demoting Hong and his subordinates when they failed to adjust to those limits. However, in early 1638 Hong Chengchou was able to surprise Li Zicheng in the Shaanxi-Sichuan border and dealt him a heavy defeat. Betting on the poor quality of his Sichuanese contingent, Chengchou put them in the center of his line. As expected, they withdrew under the rebel attack, and pulled Li's troops down the center, at which point Chengchou's crack Shaanxi troops in reserve attacked the now exposed rebels and caused the collapse of Li's army. In summer of 1638 Hong renewed the pressure on Li, and hotly pursued him. Guessing that he was trying to flee through Tong Pass, Hong contacted Sun Chuanting, who established a three-pronged ambush. Li's army was trapped and destroyed, and he escaped with just 17 followers, remaining mostly inactive and hiding in the mountains of Shaanxi for the rest of 1638. That same year, Zhang Xianzhong surrendered to Xiong Wencan.

With the rebellions apparently under control and dealing with the aftermath of the 1638 Manchu raid, the court decided to place Hong Chengchou in charge of military affairs in the Northeast, along with some of his officers like Cao Bianjiao. Sun Chuanting vehemently opposed the transfer on the grounds that the rebellions could spread once again, and he was imprisoned. Hong Chengchou would now face the Manchus and their emperor, Hong Taiji.

=== Service in the Northeastern Theatre ===
Hong Chengchou arrived in Liaodong in 1639, and immediately started implementing measures to improve the readiness of Ming defenses in the area. Soon after his arrival, he wrote a military treatise compiling various military classics and Qi Jiguang's Jixiao Xinshu, as well as adding his own commentary related to the situation on Liaodong and his own plans for the region. He also carried out an inspection of the troops in the frontier, and, after witnessing their poor shape, he decided to create an elite corps of 10.000 soldiers stationed in two newly created training bases on strategic locations, to serve as a reserve that could be used as a rapid deployment force.

In addition, he tightened up military discipline, and centralised local military power in the hands of regional commanders, thereby simplifying chains of command, and allowing all troops, including officer's retainers (jiading), to be placed under those regional commanders during emergencies. The security of food supply lines was also improved, with Hong taking a role in selecting the routes used and the escorts. Thus, the amount of food convoys lost to marauding parties of Manchu cavalrymen was greatly diminished. Hong also reaffirmed the importance of firearms in fighting the Manchu, as many officers had done before, and he requested to be supplied with more small arms, Western-style cannon and artillery experts. Finally, in the autumn of 1639 he started promoting local weapon factories to keep a steady supply line instead of depending on the court. A Bureau of Military Equipment was opened in Kaipingwei to produce armor, a Bureau of Firearms was opened in Guzhi to produce three-eyed guns, and a Bureau of Gunpowder was established at Jizhou to produce gunpowder. Meanwhile, Jirgalang led attacks in the Song-Jin region during summer and autumn of 1639, but the Qing failed to make headway.

The Qing established first advanced positions at Yizhou, setting up military farms to supply their troops. In spring of 1640, Hong Taiji was presented with four plans on how to deal with the Ming in the following years, and eventually decided to try to finally capture the Songshan-Jinzhou-Shanhaiguan corridor and consolidate definitively in Liaodong. More skirmishes were fought in the first half of 1640. In a clash near Ningyuan, cannon and arrow fire caused many casualties to Qing forces. Hong Chengchou moved northwards to Ningyuan in June, and the Qing finally invested Jinzhou and started working on fortified positions. During the rest of 1640 and early 1641, the Qing kept probing Ming defenses but were generally repulsed, although the siege of Jinzhou continued. Hong Chengchou resolved to resupply Jinzhou and reduce the logistical strain on his forces, so he took two measures. First, he was successful in delivering extensive food supplies, enough for five or six more months, into Jinzhou, and some time later he slipped in even more supplies. Second, he redeployed three fifths of his reinforcements back to Shanhaiguan, while at the same time deceiving the Qing into thinking that he was actually receiving more reinforcements.

Ming cavalrymen in the 1640's

However, during early 1641, the court decided that Hong should take a more offensive posture. Cautioned by Zu Dashou, Hong Chengchou moved forwards with his war-cart army in a series of careful stages, winning skirmishes with the Qing as he went. According to Korean historical records, two Manchu generals were killed in action and three more surrendered. This unfolded throughout the spring and summer of 1641. Intelligence reports received by Hong Chengchou indicated that the Manchus planned to lift the siege by the end of autumn if they had not captured the fortress of Jinzhou by then due to logistical issues. The Qing, meanwhile, kept improving the circumvallation of Songshan and Jinzhou and putting pressure on Zu Dashou, but the fortresses held firm and still had many months of supply left. However, the cost of maintaining the Ming army on the field concerned the court and the emperor. Zhang Ruoqi, an associate of the Minister of War, was sent to join the army to express the growing concern over the costs of the campaign. Zhang Ruoqi also sent reports back to the court claiming that the victories won during the summer showed that the Ming had an advantage and should press the attack, and he also started trying to usurp Hong's authority. According to some reports, he was at least partially successful at it, something that could only have worsened the cohesion of the Ming army. Finally, in spite of Hong's arguments to the contrary, Emperor Chongzhen, encouraged by Minister of War Chen Xinjia, demanded an all-out assault to relieve the siege of Jinzhou. Gathering his forces, 90.000 infantry and 40.000 cavalry, Hong Chengchou marched forwards and reached Songshan the 3 of September of 1641.

Hong's arrival panicked the Qing forces investing Jinzhou, led by Dorgon. Limited engagements were fought on the days 6, 13 and 14 of September, with the Ming forces being advantaged and putting considerable pressure on the Manchus, who were entrenched on elevated positions. Dorgon repeatedly wrote to Hong Taiji urging for reinforcements, and after completing a full mobilization, the Qing emperor led a forced march and arrived to Jinzhou. Concealing his arrival, Hong Taiji swiftly marched around and deployed his army on the major roads, surrounding Hong's army. At the same time, he sent a detachment to raid the Ming supply base at Mount Bijia. These actions had a decisive effect on the battle, as with only three days of supply remaining and surrounded on all sides, the morale of the Ming army plummeted. Hong Chengchou decided that the best course was risking it all on a final decisive engagement, but his subcommanders wavered. On the next day, as the army deployed and started his advance, most Ming subcommanders fled in panic. Wang Pu was the first to rout, and their men ran into a series of flank attacks set up by Hong Taiji. Wu Sangui was literally driven into the sea and evacuated via boat. Hong Chengchou and Cao Bianjiao managed to pull off a fighting retreat into Songshan with 10.000 troops. It was a major disaster for the Ming forces. 54.000 men were left dead on the field, and massive amounts of cannon and other weapons were captured.

After conducting a vigorous defense of Songshan for six months, with various failed attempts at relief from Shanhaiguan and at breaking out from the siege, he was captured the 18 of March of 1642 as a turncoat called Xia Chengde, the garrison commander of Songshan, opened the gates to the Manchus. Xia Chengde's followers and dependents, Hong Chengchou, governor Qiu Mingyang, and some officers related to prominent Ming generals, were spared. The rest of the remaining Ming soldiers, 100 officers and 3000 soldiers, were slaughtered, and their families kept as slaves. Although his other colleagues were quick to surrender, this was not the case with Hong. However, the exact circumstances of how he came to defect to the Manchu side are unclear, and a number of versions exist. In any case, it is very likely that Hong Taiji intended to recruit Hong, and that he held him in high regard, believing that he would be important in the conquest of China. When he finally submitted, the Manchu emperor honored him with many gifts and a palace banquet fit for a prince or vassal khan. Some of the beile were initially angered by this deferential treatment, but soon after he won their trust and respect, and he was thought of as the best Han official in Manchu service. Meanwhile, the Ming court was unaware of his defection. When Songshan fell, he was presumed dead, and emperor Chongzhen built a shrine in his honor at the Dashi Temple west of the Zhengyang Gate in Beijing, and performed sacrifices there. It wasn't until two years later that they discovered the truth and the shrine was changed to one honoring Guan Yu, although his family escaped the imperial wrath.

== Service under the Qing ==
=== Service in Jiangnan ===
In spite of the usual Manchu practice, Hong wasn't given any official title until after Hong Taiji's death. While he was formally assigned to the Chinese Bordered Yellow Banner, he was not bound to observe the duties and obligations of a bannerman, and instead accompanied the Qing emperor on important state occasions and gave advice. In particular, we know only of two specific activities he carried out: verifying the official Ming seal on a letter sent by Chongzhen, and evaluating essays on a special civil service examination. Wang Cheng-main speculates that he may have reached an understanding with Hong Taiji in which he would not accept an official Qing title until the fall of the Ming, in exchange for advice in matters of political and military nature. This was perhaps a particular expression of loyalty for the Ming.

When Li Zicheng captured Beijing the 24 of April of 1644 and emperor Chongzhen took his own life at Coal Hill, events precipitated. Li Zicheng put pressure on Wu Sangui, who commanded the last functional Ming army in the north, to surrender. When his appeals failed, he sent Bai Guang'en and Tang Tong, who had recently defected to the Shun regime, to fight Wu Sangui. However, Wu defeated Li's commanders in two battles, and this forced Li Zicheng to move northwards in person to defeat him, while Wu's forces pulled back to the more defensible Shanhaiguan. This prompted Wu to contact the Manchus, and surrender in exchange for help dealing with Li's incoming army.

Meanwhile, the Manchus were already on the move. Hong Taiji had died on September 21 of 1643 of an illness, and his third son had been enthroned as the Shunzi Emperor on October 8. However, he was still very young and needed regents, for which Dorgon and Jirgalang were chosen, although Dorgon quickly became the most powerful figure in the Qing court. As news of the rebel approach to Beijing reached the Qing court in May of 1644, Chinese officials in Manchu service like Hong Chengchou and Fan Wencheng started urging them to prepare an invasion of China, although at this point it was envisioned that they would collaborate with Li Zicheng in taking down the Ming and divide North China between both. On May 20, they received news of the demise of the Chongzhen Emperor, and also they received Wu Sangui's letter proposing an alliance and his submission to the Qing. This changed the strategical situation, and meant that the Shun rebels would be their principal foe. Hong Chengchou explained the strategy that the Manchu regime should follow:

Our military strength is not a threat to [the inhabitants of] the empire. This should first be promulgated as an order, so as to show that we are going to continue to wipe out remnant rebel elements; and will not butcher the people, nor burn their dwellings, nor plunder their valuables. Thus, they will open their gates to us and surrender, or become fifth columnists [within the cities which resist]. Moreover, it is very important that we break our [traditional] rules, and establish new laws, executed in such a way that individuals of great merit [will be encouraged to join us and] be enfeoffed as nobles. As for the bandits themselves, we must realize that if they are treated tenderly, then they will attack us. But if they are treated forcefully, they will flee. Now that they hear our armies are approaching they will inevitably flee to the west. . . . And if they do thus go, swift cavalry must pursue them. And if they should choose to stay and defend the capital, they will be even easier to crush.

Meanwhile, Fan Wencheng proposed that the political justification of the conquest should be the punishment of the rebels that had brought down the Ming emperor. Besides, both strongly advocated that Manchu forces should completely restrain from looting and pillaging to gain the goodwill of the Northern Chinese. Dorgon heeded all this advice, and it would prove to be successful. The Manchus and Wu Sangui defeated Li Zicheng at the battle of Shanhaiguan and pursued him to Beijing, and there they proclaimed that the Qing would now rule China.

It was at this point that Hong Chengchou was given official posts for the first time in the Qing establishment, with the confirmation of his previous Ming title and the appointment to be one of the five grand academicians of the Three Palace Academies, in particular in the Palace Secretariat Academy, in charge of documents relating to diplomatic missions and matters concerning the issuance of imperial edicts and funerary odes. Initially, the Three Palace Academies only received memorials that had nothing to do with the Six Boards, but Hong convinced Dorgon of making the Boards also report to the Three Palace Academies, and giving them power to recommend matters pertinent to state policy. Effectively, this gave him powers similar to those enjoyed by Ming Grand Secretaries, and many institutional reforms of this period were made through suggestions coming from the Three Palace Academies. In addition, during his stay in Beijing he was assigned a wide variety of responsibilities apart from those of his role in the Palace Academies, namely, being one of the chief editors of the Ming shi, administrating personnel in the Hanlin Academy, dealing with examinations at the senior licenciate level, and administrating the garrison of Beijing.

Early Qing campaigns in South China

In summer of 1645, after the fall of the Hongguang regime in Nanjing, the Qing court made two appointments to pacify the region and proceeding with the conquest efforts. Lekedehun was named "Generalissimo Who Pacifies The South", while Hong Chengchou was sent with the titles of Grand Secretary, Tutor to the Heir Apparent, President of the Board of War, Right Assistant Supervising Censor of the Metropolitan Censorate, and Grand Military Coordinator for the Pacification of the Province of Jiangnan and for the Regulation of Military Rations. The Qing court tasked him with the "general inspection of military affairs and the pacification of every province in South China". This meant that he was placed in overall charge of civil and military affairs in South China, with a long list of responsibilities. Hong was expected to reestablish local and provincial administrative structures as they were brought under Qing control, as well as implementing programs for economic recovery. He was also charged with securing the surrender of Ming loyalists, and, should they refuse, to send military expeditions to submit them by force. Due to the connections developed over many years of service as an official of the Ming and his diplomatic efforts, Hong Chengchou secured key surrenders in the enormous area under his supervision, like that of the notorious sealord Zheng Zhilong in Fujian.

Regarding military affairs, he had a major role in military administration and logistics, being the primary responsible for the supply and pay of Qing armies operating on the field. Besides, he also dealt with prisoners of war, incorporating trustworthy individuals into existing government units and assigning the rest and civilians who had engaged in pro-Ming activities in resettlement programmes. Hong also had a role in military planning and central command, though in this he also shared authority with Manchu military leaders. Hong Chengchou possessed the authority to deploy and maneuver units in the field, but he was required to consult with Lekedehun if he wished to do so. If Manchu units were involved, he also had to consult with Yecen, who was senior commander of the ethnically Manchu units in the region.

Nevertheless, Hong Chengchou's post gave him enormous prestige and authority, with his instructions allowing him to "act as circumstances may require without asking for approval from the court". He was able to present memorials to the court on important matters at any time, he had the authority to recommend individuals for government appointments and he could ask the court to promote or demote subordinate civil and military officials. Finally, he could apply the military code to civil officials below the fifth rank or military officials below the rank of Regional Vice Commander, and impeach officials of higher ranks.

The most important part of the military actions involved in the pacification of Jiangnan happened in the first sixth months of his arrival to the theater. Jin Sheng was an important figure in Longwu's court, and led a strong force at Huizhou, Anhui. Hong Chengchou oversaw a campaign that, after three months of stalemate, broke through and destroyed Jin's army. In addition, Huang Daozhou, who was a very prestigious figure in southern Ming loyalist circles and the highest ranking official of the Longwu regime, led an army from Fujian to Jiangxi, where he was defeated by Hong's troops. In Hong's memorials about these two events there is no indication that he consulted with Lekedehun and Yecen (who were campaigning in the south, far from Jiangnan) for the use of Manchu troops, in another show of his considerable autonomy. In late 1646, Nanjing itself was attacked by the combined forces of two Ming princes, the Prince of Ruian and the Prince of Ruichang, with their loyalist militia and bandit followers and collaborators inside of the city. The attack was defeated by Hong and other officers, and the Prince of Ruian was captured and killed. Many other points of Ming resistance were suppressed during this period and by the end of Hong's tenure in the area, most of Jiangnan was pacified, and, as Wang Cheng-main puts it: "his memorials to the throne reveal careful attention to detail and the smooth functioning of his staff and command operations".

In the plane of civil administration, Hong Chengchou reconstructed the bureaucracy in the region and, using his powers to promote and demote, re-staffed the Jiangnan administration recommending the assignment of hundreds of former Ming officials. He also faced the problem of economic reconstruction in Jiangnan, as the war had completely disrupted local economy and farming. Thanks to his experience as an official in Shaanxi during the Ming, he was able to identify and respond to the most pressing needs of the region. Unclaimed land was put to use, taxes were lowered or temporarily suspended, relief measures were adopted for the supply of grain, and agricultural production was reestablished. Jiangnan had to provide grain for the capital and the armies campaigning further to the south, so the recovery of the region was a pressing concern. Hong accomplished these tasks and stability was achieved in the areas under his jurisdiction, while maintaining strict accounting and cooperating with Manchu officials.

All these responsibilities implied an enormous amount of work on Hong's part, often laboring from early in the morning to late in the night, and it had a serious impact in his health. Already in 1646 he started losing eyesight, and twice asked for a rest leave that was denied. When the Qing army occupied Quanzhou, Hong discovered that his father had died in 1643, and requested the customary mourning leave of absence. It was denied. No doubt due to the heavy reliance of the Qing on his work in the region, they refused to let him leave, and by April of 1647 he went completely blind in the right eye.

However, a series of scandals in 1647 slowly convinced the Qing court that agreeing to Hong's absence of leave proposals was in their interest. A Qing commander named Wu Shengzhao deployed at Songjiang developed Ming loyalist sentiments during late 1646 through contacts with Fujianese gentrymen in his staff, and the possibility of an alliance with the Ming Prince of Lu in Zhejiang was considered. Eventually, he agreed to rise up in revolt in coordination with a naval attack by Southern Ming forces, with the objective of targeting the Qing positions along the Yangzi River. The revolt was discovered before Wu rose in arms, Wu Shengzhao was captured and the Ming naval thrust defeated. However, Hong Chengchou fell under suspicion due to links with loyalist literati whose importance in the rebellion was overstated. In addition, as the political opposition in Jiangnan was mostly broken in 1647, the Qing court was now powerful enough to cast doubt over the policy of generally accepting former Ming officials into service, a policy that had been strongly championed by Hong Chengchou. In this atmosphere, on October 1, 1647, a courier from the court of the Ming Prince of Lu was captured carrying letters asking Hong for assistance in exchange for a ducal title. However, the court cleared Hong of any implications and decreed that it had been a scheme to sow discord and undermine Hong Chengchou.

A more serious case flared up short after during October. Guards on the gates of Nanjing detained a monk called Hanke, who produced a passport signed and sealed by Hong Chengchou. When they examined his baggage, they found correspondence indicating that Hong Chengchou was in contact with loyalist circles in Guangdong. This was extremely concerning for the Manchu court for several motives. In the first place, several uprisings in the Pearl River Delta in August meant the Qing was heavily fighting in the region. Second, the correspondence itself didn't necessarily mean that Hong was a secret agent of the Southern Ming, and just like the letters of the Prince of Lu, there was the chance that the documents were designed to sow suspicion. However, there was a personal connection between Hong and Hanke, who also had a personal connection with the loyalist literati circles of Guangdong. Hanke's father was Han Rizuan, who had been Minister of Rites and Hong Chengchou's examination supervisor in 1616. Hong memorialized to the throne as follows:

The criminal monk Hanke is the son of my former teacher when I sat for the metropolitan examinations: Han Rizuan, who was once the Ming Minister of Rites. It is many years since he left his family. In the first lunar month of 1645 he came to Jiangning from Guangdong to print sutras. Then the Grand Army came to pacify the south, and the roads to Guangdong were blocked so that he could not return. He stayed for a long time in the capital. I was in Jiangnan, but I never set eyes upon him. Now because the roads to Guangdong are open, he was to return to his village and asked me for a passport. I gave him a written passport, but the restrictions on it were extremely severe. Therefore, when he left by the city gate he was searched. In his trunk there was the draft of a letter from the Prince of Fu to Ruan Dacheng. The characters failed to avoid taboo [words]. There was also a document recording rebellion, which involved current affairs. Hanke did not actually carry out [sedition] in person, but he brought this transgression upon himself. I have been connected with Hanke’s family for generations and it is difficult to avoid suspicion. I dare not trust my own judgment when it comes to [deciding] whether the nature of the crime is severe or light.

When the Inner Boards in Beijing reviewed the case, they agreed that the punishment should be severe and recommended that Hong was stripped of all ranks and dismissed from office. However, Hong Chengchou was the paramount figure of Southern Han Chinese collaborators with the Manchu regime, and his dismissal would expose the suspicions of treason among high rank Han adherents. Therefore, Dorgon ignored the recommendation and pardoned Hong Chengchou, citing his many achievements in Jiangnan. Fortunately for the court and Hong, a way out appeared almost at the same time. Hong's mother fell ill, so he applied again for a leave-of-absence to care for her. This time it was granted, and Hong moved back to Beijing in 1658 and was received with a feast and the gift of an official robe and boots. The emperor ordered him to return to the Palace Academies.

=== Back at Beijing ===
Once back in the court at the capital, Hong Chengchou was put in charge of the various important administrative tasks he had been in charge of before departing for Jiangnan. Besides, he also designed in 1649 a new recommendation system, so that an official was responsible for the conduct of all individuals recommended by him, with rewards and punishments. When regent Dorgon died in 1650, Hong was unaffected by the political struggle that followed, that affected high ranking Manchu and Han officials like Fan Wencheng, who was stripped of his titles. He may have known how to distance himself from Manchu political struggles and, perhaps, both factions realized he was not expendable. Soon after, the Shunzi Emperor took the reins of government personally, and Chengchou remained an important part of his regime, as a new round of political reforms started being implemented. A triumvirate of Southerners (Hong Chengchou, Chen Mingxia and Chen Zilin) became Shunzi's trusted reformers in the bureaucracy in 1651. Hong in particular was concerned with the corruption in the Censorate, having been named Censor-in-chief of the Left. Thus, he undertook a purge of the Censorate. Hong evaluated all censors and ranked them according to a six-tiered system, in accordance of which they were promoted, demoted or transferred. Besides, in late 1651 Hong was finally allowed to enter the niru as a full-fledged member, after years of being merely attached to the Han Bordered Yellow Banner.

However, important political developments in the south and southwest completely changed the situation. In 1647-1648 the adopted sons of the renowned bandit Zhang Xiangzhong (Sun Kewang, Li Dingguo, Liu Wenxiu, Ai Nengqi) had established a strong regime in Yunnan and allied with the Ming court of the Yongli Emperor. There, they consolidated their regime and marshaled forces for a major counteroffensive against the Qing all along the southwest. Finally, in 1652 they made their move. Li Dingguo attacked the prince Kong Youde in Guangxi and, after defeating his army in a series of engagements, took Guilin. Kong Youde, trapped inside the city, committed suicide. The Southern Ming forces then recaptured much of Guangxi and started making inroads into Huguang. The Manchu court sent the prince Nikan in August 1652 with 100.000 men to counterattack, but Li Dingguo destroyed this army in an elaborate ambush in January of 1653 and Nikan was killed in the fighting.

Meanwhile in Sichuan, Wu Sangui was directing an offensive during early 1652 against Southern Ming positions in the north of the province, and he pushed them back south. However, Sun Kewang sent Liu Wenxiu to retake the province. Liu initially repelled the Qing and recovered Xuzhou, Chongqing and Chengdu, but he lost a pitched battle at Baoning against Wu Sangui. As a result, the Southern Ming position in the entirety of Sichuan was entirely compromised, but the heavy fighting meant that Wu had been tied up and unable to drive south to help Nikan's force. Sun Kewang also directed an offensive of his own in late 1652, attacking Qing positions in Huguang, and found initial success by taking Chenzhou. However, in spring of 1653 he was repulsed at Baoqing by the veteran Qing commander Tong Tulai.

In spite of the defeats of Liu Wenxiu and Sun Kewang, Li Dingguo's spectacular successes shocked the Qing court, which believed that its position in South China was critically threatened, especially if the Yongli court could link up with the Ming remnants in Fujian led by Koxinga. It was in this climate that they turned once again to Hong Chengchou, and appointed him Viceroy of Huguang, Liangguang, Yunnan and Guizhou to take charge of affairs in the southwest.

=== Viceroy of Huguang, Liangguang, Yunnan and Guizhou ===
The situation he found on his arrival appeared critical, and this image was further reinforced by the lack of intelligence overall on the overall situation in South China. The Ming firmly controlled Yunnan and Guizhou, they occupied most of Huguang, and they were on the attack in Guangdong and Guangxi. Most aboriginal peoples, like the Miao and Yao rejected Qing rule. The Kuidong 13 also occupied the mountainous area between Sichuan and Huguang and fortified it, preventing the Qing forces from controlling the region for many years to come. In addition, the difficult terrain made maneuvering and logistics more complicated, and the hot weather wore down the northern soldiers, accustomed to a colder and drier climate. On the civil side of things, the area was devastated. Many cities were in ruins, and many people had fled to remote areas to escape from the conflict. The fields were no longer cultivated and most businesses had shut down, which made the task of supplying food locally very hard. It was also very hard to levy taxes or new conscripts for these areas, so the Qing depended on other regions for funds, supplies and reinforcements. To deal with the situation, and drawing on his experience fighting the peasant rebellions, Hong decided to move very gradually, while consolidating the Qing position all across the region. Instead of attempting to fight pitched battles with the main enemy forces, he aimed to gradually squeeze the Ming out of Huguang, Guangxi and Guangdong, containing them in Guizhou and Yunnan. Meanwhile, he made an effort to improve the living conditions of the people while building up a store of military supplies, to foster support for the Qing and ease logistics.

In 1653, the main aim of Hong was to dislodge the Ming from Huguang and Guangxi. While the armies in Guangxi were ordered to defend against Li Dingguo's roving force, the main force moved into northern Hubei. Hong's forces destroyed the enemy strongholds one by one and the loyalist armies were driven out of the region by late 1653. These efforts were aided by the growing conflict among the Yongli court, primarily, between Li Dingguo and Sun Kewang. Immediately after his great victory after Nikan, Li had stopped receiving supplies and logistical support from his brother, who controlled the court, and the fighting condition of his forces suffered as a result. Already in 1653, Sun sent Feng Shuanli with an army to outright attack Li, though Feng was defeated. Li's hold on Guangxi, that had never been very firm in the first place, started vanishing, with Geng Jimao and others inflicting losses on the loyalist army. Meanwhile, the Qing were also fighting in Hunan. Qing forces defeated Li Dingguo and Sun Kewang, and forced them to retreat into Guangxi and Guizhou respectively. Hunan was conquered by late 1653.

In 1654 the bulk of the fighting happened in Guangdong and Guangxi. Li Dingguo launched a major offensive on Guangdong hoping to link with the Zheng clan in Fujian, capturing several prefectures and closing in on Guangzhou. However, naval reinforcements under Koxinga didn't show up, the campaign dragged on, and Qing relief forces defeated him outside of Xinhui in early 1655 after a lengthy siege, and then pushed him out of Guangdong altogether. Also in 1655, during the summer, Sun Kewang launched another major campaign, this time on Changde, in Huguang. The offensive was a disaster, and his forces suffered heavy losses, although it prompted Hong to invest more resources in riverine warfare to bolster mobility.

By the end of 1655, the Ming forces had been pushed back to their bases in Guizhou and Yunnan, according to Hong Chengchou's strategy. He then deployed his armies, numbering 200.000, to confine the loyalists to Southwest China. The Governor-General of Sichuan, the able Li Guoying, was stationed at Baoning. Hong Chengchou himself was stationed at Changsha. Shang Kexi and Geng Jimao were deployed at Zhaoying and Guangzhou, respectively. Finally, a Manchu commander was deployed at Jingzhou. Hong instructed all his forces to counterattack if the loyalists moved against Hunan, Sichuan or Guangdong, but also to refrain from pursuing into Yunnan or Guizhou. The Ming tried to break the blockade, but they were pushed back. After two years of heavy fighting, Hong's effort to confine the Ming to those two provinces had been successful, which gave him a free hand to act in already occupied provinces. Hong saw this respite as very necessary, for a series of reasons. He saw the threat posed by Yongli and his court as the greatest threat to Qing legitimacy in the tenuously held South. The Qing supply lines were overstretched and precarious, and the ravaged local economies supposed a problem for Hong, who had to feed and protect these new subject to foster loyalty and goodwill, something that ultimately also affected how many supplies could be directed to the military. Logistical issues had been common in the south and southwest so far, and the court was incurring in great deficit to cover all the costs of warfare.

Hong initially hoped to launch the final offensive into Yunnan and Guizhou in 1656, but soon he concluded that it was unfeasible. The government had failed to send enough reinforcements and his own recruitment campaigns so far had failed to achieve their goals. As a result, the Qing would have been unable to effectively hold new territory plus the barely consolidated regions conquered during 1655, so the campaign was postponed. In the meantime, and just as he had done during his time in Jiangnan, Hong launched several measures to rebuild the economy and gain the goodwill of the people. The homeless were assisted in resettling deserted farms and opening up new land for cultivation. Soldiers were employed in the reconstruction of irrigation systems to ease the resumption of farming. Refugees returned to their cities and farms. Gradually there was a return to normality, and even tusi officials, or aboriginal chieftains, started supporting the government. The Qing started being able to extract food, taxes and manpower from areas south of the Yangzi. Meanwhile, government troops were kept under strict discipline, being isolated from the general population and forbidden from harassing the people. Several thousand draft cattle were imported to establish self-sufficient military colonies, an old Ming practice that Hong had already put into practice in Liaodong. Local administrations were improved in terms of quality and efficiency.

However, the trust deposited on him by the Shunzhi Emperor was unwavering. Hong Chengchou's proposals for the pacification of the south were systematically approved, and all military leaders, Chinese and Manchu, were ordered to consult with Hong on all matters of strategy and planning, being required to abide by his leadership and instructions. Shunzhi ignored all memorials that aimed to make Hong alter his own plans, and dismissed officers who disagreed with him, even Manchus. For example, in late 1656 he dismissed the highest ranking Manchu general in Southwest China for insisting on a more aggressive course of action, and replaced him with Loto, more amenable to Hong's plans.

Meanwhile, the Yongli court had erupted into open civil war. Li Dingguo launched a desperate campaign to extricate the emperor from Sun Kewang's grasp, and after much fighting he decisively defeated his adoptive brother in summer of 1657. Sun Kewang fled to the Qing at Baoqing and surrendered on December 19, 1657. He was treated respectfully and invested as Prince of Yi, and offered Hong extremely valuable intelligence regarding the defenses and troop dispositions of Li Dingguo. These developments led Hong to conclude that the moment for the decisive campaign had arrived, after years of consolidation and marshalling his forces. The Qing forces were divided in three armies that would advance along three axes, ultimately converging inside of Yunnan before reaching Kunming. Wu Sangui led the northern army from Hanzhong, Sichuan. Jobtei led the southern army from Nanning, Guangxi. Finally, Hong's central army was joined by Loto and Manchu units and departed from Changsha and Changde Weakened by the civil war between Sun and Li, the Ming positions in Guizhou, Guangxi and Sichuan crumbled in months, so that by the summer of 1658 all resistance except the Kuidong 13 in Sichuan had been stamped out.

After receiving intelligence of the situation of Yunnan gathered by spies, the commanders assembled with Hong on the tenth month of 1658 at Guiyang. Doni, newly appointed to replace Loto as highest ranking Manchu commander, proposed an advance along three routes into Yunnan, led by Wu Sangui, Jobtei and himself. After heavy fighting, all three armies broke through Ming defenses and inflicted 30.000 to 40.000 losses, including many of the war elephants. On January 5, 1659, Li Dingguo retreated back into Kunming and then followed the emperor south, on route to Burma, where the court had decided to retreat to keep the fight. On January 23, 1659, the Qing army entered Kunming and Doni asked Hong Chengchou to come to assist in establishing an administration, which he did.

Meanwhile, his physical condition had continued to worsen. He had submitted memorials asking for his retirement already in 1656 and twice in 1657. In these last memorials, submitted after suffering from a month of fever, he complained that he was physically and mentally exhausted, and felt no longer able to take an active part in the conduct of military affairs. The court initially granted the request only to rescind it a few months later, compelling him to complete the conquest of the southwest after Sun Kewang's defection. By late 1658 his vision had worsened, and indeed, he stood in the rear far from the field operations against Li Dingguo and the Yongli court. During 1659, directing once more the program of pacification and reconstruction of the conquered territory, his health kept getting worse. He could not read even large characters anymore, and reports had to be read to him. He was unable to recognize people by sight, and needed assistance to walk. He sent a memorial on October 1659 asking for retirement again, and he was finally granted permission to return to Beijing on 14 February 1660. To assume his responsibilities in the pacification of the southwest and the final defeat of the fled Yongli court, Hong recommended that Wu Sangui was appointed as Prince of the First Degree and made Governor-General of Yunnan and Guizhou. Indeed, he was made the ultimate civil and military authority in the region as one of the Three Feudatories.

When Hong reached the capital of Beijing, his patron Shunzi had died shortly before on February 5, 1661. Hong was granted definitive retirement in early 1662 and died on April 3, 1665. In spite of former promises of the court and for unclear reasons, he was not granted a very high-ranking nobiliary title, and it was extraordinarily low given his position and merits. That he did not surrender voluntarily back in 1642, that the regents for Kangxi looked down on him as part of the victorious army at Song-Jin, and that their ideological stance and his previous popularity with Shunzhi had a role have been proposed as causes, but there is no conclusive evidence either way.
