= Songshan, Liaoning =

Songshan 松山镇
- Town
- Location in Liaoning
- Coordinates: 41°01′35″N 121°08′45″E
- Country: People's Republic of China
- Province: Liaoning
- Prefecture-level city: Jinzhou
- District: Taihe
- Village-level divisions: 24 villages
- Elevation: 55 m (180 ft)
- Time zone: UTC+8 (China Standard)
- Area code: 0416

Songshan (Chinese: 松山; pinyin: Sōngshān) is a town of Taihe District, in the southern suburbs of Jinzhou, Liaoning, People's Republic of China, situated 7 kilometres (4.3 mi) from downtown and located along China National Highway 102. As of 2011, it has 24 villages under its administration.

== See also ==
- List of township-level divisions of Liaoning
