= Fan Wencheng =

Qing dynasty politician (1597–1666)

Second Class jinkini hafan Baksi Fan Wencheng 范文程
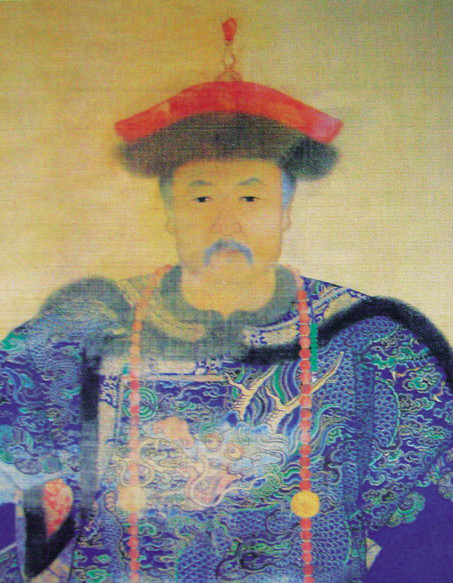

Deliberative Minister
- In office 1652–1654

Grand Secretary of the Palace Secretariat Academy
- In office 1636–1654

Personal details
- Born: 1597 Fushun, Ming China
- Died: 1666 (aged 68–69) Beijing, Qing China
- Relatives: Fan Chengmo, Fan Chengxun (son)
- Education: xiucai degree in the Imperial Examination
- Occupation: Statesman

Military service
- Allegiance: Qing Empire
- Branch/service: Han Chinese Bordered Yellow Banner
- Years of service: 1644–1666

Fan Wencheng (Chinese: 范文程; pinyin: Fàn Wénchéng, courtesy name: Xiandou 憲斗, 1597–1666) was a Qing dynasty scholar-official, prime minister and grand secretary (Daxue Shi). His official career went through four generation of Qing dynasty emperors through Nurhaci, Hong Taiji, Shunzhi, and Kangxi. Many rules and regulations in the early days of the Qing dynasty were drafted by him.

== Early life ==
=== Nurhaci's appreciation ===
He was born in an official family in Ming dynasty, claiming himself to be a descendant of Fan Zhongyan (989–1052), a famous statesman in the Northern Song dynasty. However, the Fan family had exiled and migrated to Manchuria by early 17th century. (The specific position is in Shenyang city in China.) Fan Wencheng's great-grandfather was the president of the Board of War during the Ming dynasty who surrendered to Manchu army (led by Nurhachi) when it conquered the North Pass (Fushun) in 1618. Fan Wencheng loved reading when he was a young. He was very intelligent and decisive and became a scholar (秀才) of Shenyang city.

In 1618, When Nurhaci overcame Fushun from the Ming dynasty, Fan Wencheng was brought to Nurhaci's headquarters. Nurhaci was respected and recognized Fan's wisdom and knowledge after speaking with him. Nurhaci also learned of Fan's ancestral connections to the Song official Fan Zhongyan, with whose story Nurhaci is depicted as being casually familiar. The khan was delighted and said to the gathered nobles, out of Fan's hearing, evidently, "This is the descendant of a famous minister, and you are to greet him most cordially." Soon, Fan was promoted from a flunky to a statesman by Nurhaci, because Fan's idea of defeating the Ming cajoled the Jin khans into pursuing this "great enterprise."

=== Defeating the Ming dynasty ===
Fan Wencheng was familiar with the political and military situations in the Ming dynasty and the Liaodong area. Hence, he was chosen by Nurhaci as a counselor for a war. After Nurhaci died, his son Hong Taiji became the emperor. Hong Taiji called Fan Wencheng to help him deal with the affairs of the court. Fan's courage and wisdom, and his tactics and wisdom on the battlefield helped the Qing to defeat the Ming many times.

- Battle of Zunhua – In 1629, Fan was deployed to Zunhua to prevent the Qing troops by Hong Taiji. The Ming dynasty army attack, the Qing army struggling. Fan led the soldiers of the Qing dynasty to break through. Because of his illustrious military exploits, Fan was awarded an official position called "Youji Shizhi" (游击世职)
- Battle of Da'ankou (大安口之战) – In 1629, the army of the Ming dynasty besieged the army of the Qing at Da'ankou in Liaoyang city. Fan Wencheng's army used firearms to counter the army of the Ming and successfully led the troops of the Qing to break through.
- Battle of Dalinghe – In 1631, The emperor Hong Taiji led about seventy thousand to attack Dalinghe city, Fan listened to the instructions of the emperor and sent him to persuade the Ming army to surrender. However, the Ming army would rather die than surrender. Therefore, Fan let the troops wait outside the city, and he went to the city to persuade Ming army to surrender. In the end, he succeeded in persuading the Ming dynasty to surrender and also captured a lot of resources.

== Helping Qing rule ==
Bordered Yellow Banner

When the Qing dynasty was just established, Fang Wencheng emphasized the importance of respecting the traditional Han culture to the new Manchu emperors, and consequently the Han Chinese during the early Qing dynasty were ironically somewhat grateful to him After Hong Taiji died, his son Shunzhi became the emperor of Qing dynasty. Shunzhi emperor called Fan family attached to the Bordered Yellow Banner. When Dorgon was in command of the Qing army to crusade against the Ming dynasty, Fan submitted a written statement to Shunzhi claimed that now people are destitute, before, Qing dynasty used massacres to suppress the insurgency, so the people were suspicious of the purpose of the Qing dynasty. Therefore, this expedition requires that soldiers strictly abide by the discipline. The Qing army should respect the Han people and do not infringe on the wealth of the Han people. Therefore, People will know the intention of the Qing dynasty. According to the Draft History of Qing, Fan suggested that the official in the Ming dynasty can continue to be an official to help people to get rid of poverty, and the Qing should widely recruit capable and talented people to join the Qing dynasty.

== Retirement ==
After Fan Wencheng retired, Emperor Shunzhi also pursued him as Grand Tutor (太傅) and Grand Guardian of the Heir Apparent (太子太保). These positions are the first grade of the Qing government office, symbolizing the highest honor of the entire empire. The Grand Tutor is the emperor's teacher, and the Grand Guardian of the Heir Apparent protects the security of the crown prince.

Fan Wencheng died aged 70 after Kangxi became emperor in 1666.

== Contribution ==
As a Han Chinese, Fan Wencheng was placed in a high position in the court by the Manchu ruler in a long time of period. Fan Wencheng was responsible for many of the important enterprises of the Qing court during its first 30 years. Fan Wencheng himself was prime minister to Emperor Shunzhi for almost 10 years. It is undeniable that his intelligence and strategy greatly helped the Qing emperors to rule China.

Fan drafted the document in which the regent Dorgon announced the new regime's intent to assume the throne in Beijing.

== Bibliography ==
- History of China (中国通史) the tenth volume, the Qing dynasty, chapter 8 "Fan Wencheng"[1]
- Draft History of Qing "Fan Wencheng zhuang" (范文程传)
- Qing Governors and Their Provinces: The Evolution of Territorial Administration in China, 1644–1796 by R. Kent Guy [2]
- Between Noble and Humble: Cao Xueqin and the Dream of the Red Chamber by Ruchang Zhou [3]
- Hummel, Arthur W. Sr., ed. (1943). "Fan Wên-ch'êng" . Eminent Chinese of the Ch'ing Period. United States Government Printing Office.
