= Battle of Dalinghe =

- Part of the Ming-Qing transition
Date	September – November 1631
Location	Dalinghe
Result	Later Jin victory

Belligerents
Later Jin dynasty	Ming dynasty

Commanders and leaders
Hong Taiji; Tong Yangxing; Ajige; Dodo (WIA); Daišan	Sun Chengzong; Zu Dashou; Wu Xiang; Zhang Chun; Zu Dabi; Song Wei; He Kegang

Strength
80,000	Zu Dashou: 13,800; Sun Chengzong: 40,000; Jinzhou: 6,000; Songshan: 2,000

The Battle of Dalinghe (Chinese: 大凌河之役) was a battle between the Later Jin dynasty and the Ming dynasty that took place between September and November 1631. Later Jin forces besieged and captured the fortified northern Ming city of Dalinghe (大凌河; present-day Linghai) in Liaoning. Using a combined force of Jurchen and Mongol cavalry, along with recently captured Ming artillery units, the Later Jin khan Hong Taiji surrounded Dalinghe and defeated a series of Ming reinforcement forces in the field. The Ming defenders under general Zu Dashou surrendered the city after taking heavy losses and running out of food. Several of the Ming officers captured in the battle would go on to play important roles in the ongoing transition from Ming to Qing. The battle was the first major test for the Chinese firearms specialists incorporated into the Later Jin military. Whereas the Later Jin had previously relied primarily on their own Eight Banners cavalry in military campaigns, after the siege of Dalinghe the Chinese infantry would play a larger role in the fighting. Unlike Nurhaci's failed siege at the Battle of Ningyuan several years prior, the siege of Dalinghe was a success that would soon be replicated in Songshan and Jinzhou, paving the way for the establishment of the Qing dynasty and the ultimate defeat of the Ming.

== Prelude ==
In 1629, the Jurchen army under Hong Taiji invaded the Ming, bypassing the heavily defended Ming fortress at Ningyuan, where Hong Taiji's father Nurhaci had been defeated three years earlier by Yuan Chonghuan at the Battle of Ningyuan. Slipping through friendly Mongol territory, the Jurchens attacked to the west through Xifengkou Pass (喜峰口) in Hebei province, aiming towards the capital at Beijing in what became known as the Jisi Incident. Yuan, who was still commander of the Ningyuan garrison, sent 20,000 troops under Zu Dashou to relieve Beijing. Zu crossed the Great Wall through Shanhai Pass and marched to Beijing, defeating the Jurchens outside the city walls. The failure of Yuan's northern defenses led to his arrest and subsequent execution. Before his death, however, he had used the prestige resulting from his previous victory over Nurhaci to rebuild Jinzhou, Songshan and Dalinghe into military colonies (屯, tun) protected by heavy fortifications as part of a forward defense policy that called for building strongholds north of the Great Wall, in particular at Ningyuan, which had served as his base of operations.

Hong Taiji was able to capture several cities in northeast China in the 1629 campaign, including Luanzhou, Qian'an, Zunhua, and Yongping (present-day Lulong County). The surrender of the Yongping garrison gave the Jurchens access to the so-called "red barbarian" and "generalissimo" cannons (大將軍炮), European designs that Shandong's Christian governor Sun Yuanhua had proposed for adoption by the Ming military. In 1623 some of these European cannons were deployed to the northern frontier under generals such as Sun Chengzong and Yuan Chonghuan. The new artillery had, in fact, been instrumental in Yuan's defense of Ningyuan against Nurhaci in 1626. Hong Taiji, Nurhaci's son, now had access to the same technology himself. Tong Yangxing (佟養性), a former Ming officer, was given command of three thousand Chinese troops and the responsibility of managing the artillery experts captured at Yongping. By 1631, they had produced forty cannons. These troops were the initial core of what would come to be known as the "Old Han Troops" (舊漢兵).

In 1630, Hong Taiji left his cousin Amin in Yongping to defend the newly conquered territory. Zu Dashou embarked on a counterattack and recovered Luanzhou. In response, Amin ordered a massacre of the civilian populations of Qian'an and Yongping, plundering the cities and abandoning them to the Ming. News of the slaughter enraged Hong Taiji, who had been cultivating relations with the Chinese population to pacify captured cities and encourage defection by Ming officers.

== Battle ==
Dalinghe was the most forward-placed of all the Ming garrisons in Liaodong. It was protected by a dense network of over one hundred well-stocked, mutually-supporting castles (台, tai), each commanded by a Ming officer. In 1631, Zu Dashou was serving as commander of the nearby Jinzhou garrison. On September 1, he was leading his troops on an inspection of Dalinghe, whose fortifications had recently been reinforced, when Hong Taiji, commanding a force of Jurchen, Mongol, and Han Chinese troops, arrived to attack the city. Estimates of the Jin army's size range from 20,000 to 80,000 men. At Dalinghe, Zu commanded an army of about 14,000 men, many of whom were veterans of his previous battles with Jurchen forces. The presence of Zu's men was made known to Hong Taiji when his patrols captured a Chinese resident outside the city. Instead of attacking the city directly, the Jurchen forces prepared for a long siege, building a moat around the city, and guarding the roads with their newly formed Chinese artillery units under Tong Yangxing.

The Jurchen forces focused their efforts on capturing the castles surrounding Dalinghe, sending messengers to each inviting their surrender. They also sent repeated appeals to Zu himself requesting his submission. Tong's artillery bombarded the castles that initially refused to surrender, causing several to eventually submit. The Ming defenders attempted several sallies from the city, but were generally unsuccessful against the Jurchens. Meanwhile, two small Ming relief forces were defeated by the Jurchens outside the city: first a force of 2,000 from Songshan, then a force of 6,000 from Jinzhou. One source attributes the Jurchen victories to Jurchen and Mongol cavalry, some led by Ajige, Hong Taiji's half-brother. Another source credits the artillery of Tong Yangxing.

=== Battle of Xiaolinghe ===
In early October, a large Ming army of 40,000 men arrived near Jinzhou under the command of Zu's brother-in-law (and father of fellow frontier general Wu Sangui), Wu Xiang, and supervised by Sun Chengzong. Hong Taiji mobilized his troops, taking along Tong's artillery for support, and headed out. Personally leading a unit of 200 guards (bayara) with Dodo, Hong Taiji ambushed an encampment of 7,000 vanguards of the relief force near the banks of the Xiaolinghe (小凌河, Xiaoling River). The Ming force panicked and was easily routed by the small Jurchen force. The two sides then engaged in a field battle hours later, and again Hong emerged victorious, returning to the accolades of Daišan and the other beile encamped at Dalinghe. On October 13, Hong Taiji wrote Zu Dashou again to solicit his surrender, but received no response. On the 14th, Hong Taiji lured Zu's men to sally forth in an attempt to recapture one of the forts outside the city. The failure of Zu's attack led him to withdraw behind the walls, never attacking again for the duration of the siege.

On October 19, the main body of the 40,000 troops under Sun Chengzong set out under the command of Zhang Chun (張春). The Ming troops crossed the Xiaolinghe and arrayed themselves in a block with cannons and muskets covering each direction. Making use of Tong Yangxing's gunners, Hong Taiji broke the Ming lines after losing many of his Jurchen cavalry on several inconclusive head-on charges. The Ming army set fire to the dry autumn grass, hoping to burn Tong's artillery, but the wind direction changed and the fire turned back upon them instead. Zhang Chun was captured along with thirty-three other officers and later defected to the Jurchen side.

=== Surrender of Dalinghe ===
On November 5, Yuzizhang (于子章), the largest of the forts surrounding Dalinghe, surrendered after being pounded for several days by the "red barbarian" and "generalissimo" European cannons of Tong Yangxing. The remaining forts soon surrendered one by one. By mid-November, supplies were low in the Jurchen camp, but the surrender of Yuzizhang and the other forts gave them enough supplies to last another month. The situation was far worse inside the walls of Dalinghe, where the population had resorted to cannibalism. Messages were exchanged between the two armies regarding the possibility of surrender. Zu Dashou's adopted son Zu Kefa (祖可法) was sent to the Jurchen camp. When asked why the Chinese continued to pointlessly defend a now-empty city, Zu Kefa responded that the officers all remembered what had happened at Yongping, where Amin had slaughtered the population the previous year.

After more messages were exchanged, Zu stated his willingness to surrender on the condition that the khan immediately send a force to attack Jinzhou, where Zu's family and those of many of his officers lived. This would enable the soldiers to be reunited with their kin. Knowing that his army was in no condition to mount another major attack, Hong Taiji agreed to a plan in which Zu himself would return to Jinzhou, of which he was still the commanding officer, under the pretense of having escaped from Dalinghe. After entering the city, he would turn it over to the khan. With the plan decided, Zu's forces finally surrendered Dalinghe on November 21. Of the 30,000 people in the city, less than 12,000 had survived.

== Aftermath ==
Zu Dashou had promised to take Jinzhou for Hong Taiji, but when he actually arrived at his old garrison there, he returned to the service of the Ming. He remained at the Jinzhou garrison for the next ten years as its commander. Hong Taiji besieged Jinzhou and Songshan in 1641, and in 1642, Zu surrendered to Hong for the second time. Wu Xiang, whose relief force was defeated at Dalinghe, was killed in 1644 in Beijing by the anti-Ming rebel Li Zicheng, who had captured the Ming capital. Wu Xiang's son Wu Sangui was the commander of Shanhai Pass, the last major obstacle between the Jurchens and Beijing. Wu Sangui, who was also Zu Dashou's nephew, defected to the Jurchens after his father's death, paving the way for the pivotal Battle of Shanhai Pass that established Jurchen supremacy in northern China.

The Battle of Dalinghe had proven that the Jurchens were now capable of using artillery to counter the fortifications along the Ming empire's northern frontier. Whereas the Ming had initially been reluctant to adopt foreign technology in the form of the Portuguese cannons, the Jurchens readily made use of them to address their relative weakness in siege warfare. Instead of avoiding the main Ming strongholds in Liaodong as he had in his 1629 expedition, Hong Taiji could now fight them head on. Moreover, the battle was a success for the newly formed Chinese units fighting under the Jurchens. As the ranks of Ming defectors swelled after Dalinghe and the subsequent battles of Songshan and Jinzhou, the Chinese artillery forces under Tong Yangxing would be expanded into the Han Chinese Eight Banners, fighting alongside the original Jurchen Eight Banners and the Mongol Eight Banners. The Ming officers who surrendered in these campaigns would later have successful careers under the Jurchens. The Liaodong natives of the northern frontier were the best troops of the Ming military, and their incorporation into the Jin dealt the Ming dynasty a crippling blow. In 1635, Hong Taiji declared that his people, formerly called the Jurchens, would henceforth be called the Manchus, and in 1636 he changed the name of his empire from the Later Jin to the Qing. The Qing dynasty would go on to defeat the Ming and rule over China.

== Bibliography ==
- Wakeman, Frederic Jr. (1985), The Great Enterprise: The Manchu Reconstruction of Imperial Order in Seventeenth-century China, Berkeley: University of California Press, ISBN 0520048040
- Elliott, Mark C. (2001), The Manchu Way: The Eight Banners and Ethnic Identity in Late Imperial China, Stanford University Press, ISBN 9780804746847
- Swope, Kenneth M. (2014), The Military Collapse of China's Ming Dynasty, 1618-44, Routledge, ISBN 9781134462094
