= Jeong Duwon =

Korean Yangban and diplomat

- Hangul: 정두원
- Hanja: 鄭斗源
- RR: Jeong Duwon
- MR: Chŏng Tuwŏn

Jeong Duwon (b. 1581), also known as Chong Tuwon, was a Korean Yangban and diplomat. His chance encounter with a generous member of the Jesuit China missions greatly expanded Korean knowledge of western science, technology, geographical knowledge, and culture centuries before it opened its borders to actual visitors from abroad.

== Life ==
During a diplomatic mission to the Ming in Beijing in early 1631, Jeong stopped at Dengzhou (now Penglai) on the northern coast of Shandong. (Note: This meeting is sometimes erroneously reported as having occurred in Beijing or Nanjing (as in Hulbert).) The normal route was overland, but the Koreans were obliged to travel directly across the Yellow Sea owing to the northern war zones created by the initial phases of the Manchu conquest of China. There, he met with the province's Christian governor under the Ming Ignatius Sun, who introduced him to the Jesuit interpreter João Rodrigues. Rodrigues was working with Gonçalo Teixeira-Correa to train Sun's forces in the use of European-style cannon. He made a personal gift of his telescope to Jeong, which became the first such device known in Korea. He also laded Jeong down with Jesuit texts on astronomy and other sciences including Alenio's Record of Foreign Lands (Korean: 직방외기, Chikpang Oegi); a treatise on artillery and its use; and a guide to European customs and manners, as well as works on Christianity. Despite also receiving some European firearm, (Note: The gun provided to Jeong has been variously described as a cannon, small fieldgun, a musket, and a pair of pistols.) Jeong praised the telescope most highly, as he understood its importance for warfare. He also had his assistants Yi Yeonghu (이영후, 李栄後) and Colonel Jeong Hyogil (정효길, 鄭孝吉) speak with Rodrigues in greater detail, Yi about geography and Col. Jeong about Western firearms and cannon. A record survives of Yi's conversation. He was most curious about whether or not China—whose native name Zhōngguó (中國) literally means "The Central Realm"—did in fact occupy the middle of the Earth. Rodrigues replied that, since the Earth was a sphere, every country could truthfully claim their land as its center.

== Legacy ==
Yi Sugwang had accumulated enough material from the Jesuits during his own diplomatic visits in the 1590s that he was able to compile the encyclopedic Jibong Yuseol. Another diplomat returned with a copy of Ricci's world map in 1603. Nonetheless, the additional material provided to Jeong has still been credited with the full-scale introduction of Western astronomical methods and jurisprudence to Korea. Jeong's mission is still taught to Korean schoolchildren as the country's introduction to Western science, religion, and culture.

== See also ==
- Christianity in Korea
- Jesuit China mission
