= Gonçalo Teixeira Correia =

Portuguese artillery captain

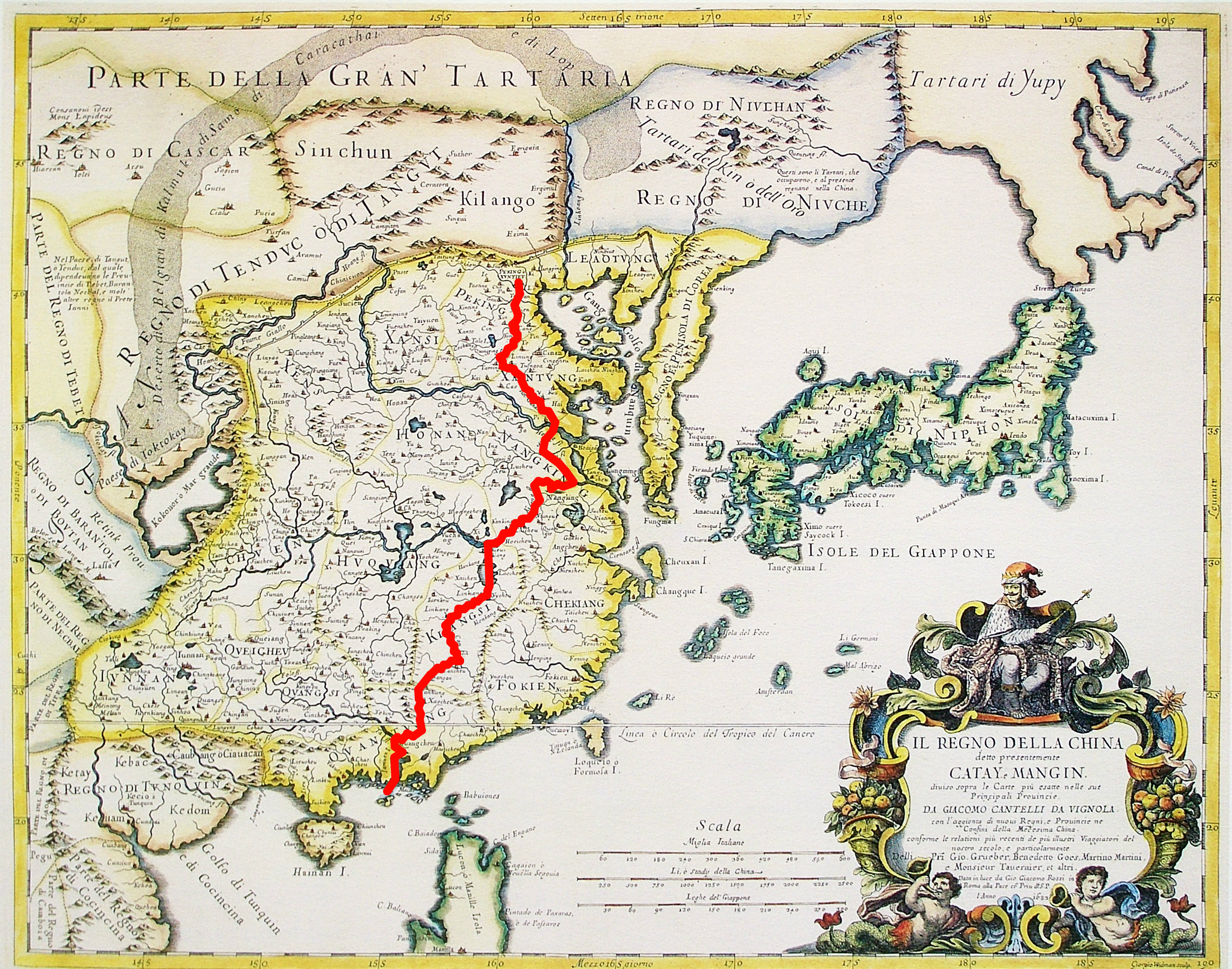
- Correia's route superimposed on a 17th-century map of China
- Born: c. 1583
- Died: 12 February 1632 (aged 48-49); Dengzhou, Ming Empire
- Military career
- Allegiance: Kingdom of Portugal
- Branch: Artillery
- Rank: Captain

Gonçalo Teixeira Correia (c. 1583 – 12 February 1632) was a Portuguese artillery captain who led a mission across the Ming Empire to fight its Manchu invaders and train its army in the use of Western cannon. After he was killed defending Dengzhou (now Penglai) in Shandong from mutinous troops under Kong Youde and Geng Zhongming, he was eulogized and honored by the Chinese, whose War Ministry granted him the posthumous rank of Assistant Regional Commander.

== Name ==
Gonçalo Teixeira Correia
- Traditional Chinese: 公沙·的西勞
- Simplified Chinese: 公沙·的西劳
Transcriptions
Standard Mandarin
- Hanyu Pinyin: Gōngshā Díxīláo
- Wade–Giles: Kung-sha Ti-hsi-lao

Correia's name appears in contemporary records as Goncallo or Gonsalo Teixeira Correa. Following Portuguese conventions, it is the latter of his surnames which he received from his father but it is sometimes omitted. His given name is usually amended to the modern Portuguese spelling Gonçalo; some sources use his surname's archaic spelling, as Corrêa. (Note: His surname is also sometimes mistakenly emended to Teixeiro.) His name is also sometimes given as Gonçalvo or as the Spanish Gonzalo or Gonzalvez.

== Life ==
=== Macao ===
Correia appears in legal documents concerning the Portuguese enclave Macao in 1623, when he is described as 39 years old.

Under the Ming, international maritime trade apart from the tribute system was notionally prohibited by the Hongwu Emperor's Ancestral Injunctions but bribery and disinterest had made enforcement lax for many decades. Correia made frequent trips to Guangzhou over the next few years, despite Dutch violence against the Portuguese and Chinese—a spill-over of their Eighty Years' War with Habsburg Spain, then in personal union with Portugal—renewing official prohibition on foreign trade for a span in late 1623 and early 1624, then almost permanently from 1626 on.

China had been impressed with "red-barbarian cannon" since around 1600, when an enormous specimen was procured from some European ship. Paul Xu—a Jesuit convert who rose to very high office in large part due to the superiority of Western geometry, with its applications in astronomy, astrology, and accurate use of artillery—warmly encouraged the use of Portuguese guns to counter the ongoing Manchu invasions of northern China. However, during Correia's time in China, there was debate among the mandarins as to whether the Manchus in the north or the increasing numbers and violence of European traders in the south were actually the greater threat. Shen Que, a Buddhist adept who rose to prominence in the Ministry of Rites, had succeeded in having the Jesuit mission in Nanjing expelled and its property confiscated in 1616 and Lu Zhaolong, a native of the Guangdong county on the mainland opposite Macao, published memorials heatedly arguing against permitting the "South-Sea barbarians" any access to China whatsoever. The competition of the factions was apparent when Xu succeeded in having a company of Portuguese gunners approved in 1620 only to have them returned the way they'd come in 1621, owing to local resistance upon various pretexts. After the fall of Guangning (now Beizhen in Liaoning), Ignatius Sun's extremely thorough memorials on the superiority of Western cannon and fortification attracted attention at the highest levels of the War Ministry. The Tianqi Emperor permitted a second Portuguese expedition to reach his capital in the spring of 1622. The same year, a Dutch assault on Portuguese Macao was repulsed when a gunner and the geometrician Giacomo Rho successfully struck the exact spot of the Dutch powder stores. The delegation in Beijing was sent home in 1624, however, when an exploding cannon killed the gunner João Correia and his two Chinese assistants.

=== Journey north ===
After more discussion, the Chongzhen Emperor approved a third and larger expedition of foreign gunners a few years later. The general Yuan Chonghuan had used his Portuguese-trained artillerists to great effect at Ningyuan in 1626, then again at Ningyuan and at Jinzhou in 1627, rolling back the Manchu cavalry that many of his men had considered "invincible". In early 1628, João Rodrigues and two others negotiated its terms at Guangzhou. Near the end of the year, Correia's reliability and experience with the Chinese caused him to win the coveted post leading the expedition. His team ultimately consisted of Rodrigues, two other interpreters (Simão Coelho and a Chinese jurubaça named Horatio Nerete), four other artillerists (Pedro de Quintal, Pedro Pinto, Francisco Aranha, and Francisco Correia), (Note: The expedition is sometimes described as having six gunners, by including the two Jesuits inspectors among their number.) and 22 Indian and African servants. The inclusion of the elderly Jesuit Rodrigues was at the insistence of the Macanese patrons of the voyage. Their battery consisted of ten heavy cannon, seven bronze and three iron, (Note: Brockey claims three cannons were bronze and seven iron.) and four "excellent bombards". They left Macao on 11 December 1628.

The officials at Guangzhou were particularly distrustful of the Jesuit Rodrigues and held Correia and his men for extensive examination. They were still ultimately required by imperial mandate to permit them passage in February 1629. In fact, Correia and Rodrigues helped to disguise the Jesuits André Palmeiro (January 1569 – 14 April 1635) and Domingos Mendes (c. 1579–1652) as part of the company until late March when it was at Nanxiong in northern Guangdong, well away from the imperial border guards. Palmeiro and Mendes then donned a disguise of Chinese clothing and bid them farewell, separating from the party to inspect various Jesuit missions throughout the country.

Despite having missed the two Jesuits, local officials continued to delay and oppose the mission. They were kept at Nanjing, just like the earlier missions, until the local mandarins received a new confirmation from Beijing that they were to be allowed closer to the capital. Rodrigues composed a report blaming the delay on winds unfavorable for passage up the Grand Canal but was only attempting to save face on both sides. Palmeiro and Mendes, despite having conducted a tour of the southern provinces almost three times longer than Correia's route, were still able to join them in the southern capital in late August. The Jesuits found them "in perfect health, but excessively annoyed by the lengthy delays and fearful that these long waits would be followed by other, greater ones". After Manchu raiders were seen near Beijing, the new permits were issued and the party permitted to continue its mission on 14 February 1630. Correia and his men were 65 kilometers (40 mi) from the capital when they encountered such a company of pillaging Manchus. The gunners retreated to nearby Zhuozhou and set up 8 of their cannon on the city walls. Without doing much damage, they were still able to compel the Manchus to retreat from the area, a result that caused them to be welcomed into Beijing triumphantly.

=== Beijing ===
In Beijing, contact between Nicolò Longobardo and Rodrigues was avoided to maintain the fiction that the Jesuits at court were entirely unrelated to the foreigners occupying Macao. The expedition of gunners was otherwise well received. Based on the battle at Zhuozhou, Correia claimed in a memorial to the throne that the Manchus continued to pose a threat to China but "300 Portuguese and a few loyal Chinese would be enough to scare off the Tartars and even to punish them in their lands". He offered his services as a negotiator with the Portuguese. Paul Xu, recently appointed Vice-Minister of War, published memorial on 2 March 1630 claiming that European weaponry consisted of better-quality metal and gunpowder, forged and sighted more accurately than their Chinese equivalents. Rodrigues submitted a memorial of his own, generally praising Macao and the Jesuits. The Chongzhen Emperor referred the question to the Ministry of Rites, which oversaw foreign affairs as well as religious ceremonial, but permitted Xu to be transferred there. As Vice-Minister of Rites, Xu offered a formal proposal on 5 June that Rodrigues be sent back to Macao to hire an infantry detachment, purchase cannon, and recruit gunners, totaling 200 men in all. He also had Giacomo Rho, the hero of the Dutch siege of Macao, visit Beijing to build interest and support. The proposal was accepted and, although some sources report that Correia returned to Macao to assemble the forces, he remained in Beijing to offer assistance with its defense while Rodrigues went south with Jiang Yunlong and two other high-ranking mandarins instructed to report any interference with his journey.

Rodrigues reached Macao by the end of August and a special 6-member committee of the senate, convened ad hoc to consider the Chinese proposal, approved a plan whereby Pedro Cordeiro and António Rodrigues do Campo would lead two companies north to Correia, who would then assume general command. The two companies together had only 160 Portuguese soldiers, supplemented by about 100 Cantonese and 100 African and Indian servants, but this was still a large contingent from a town whose entire Portuguese population at the time was less than a thousand men. In the event, the party only reached as far as Nanchang in Jiangxi before they were turned back. On 27 June, the Chinese had learned that the Manchus were withdrawing due to epidemic diseases among their men and horses. By July, officials in the capital were submitting memorials that Portuguese help was no longer needed or advisable. Lu Zhaolong's in particular suggested that the Portuguese would use their military aid as a bargaining chip in negotiations concerning Macao, where officials had already pushed to maintain greater food stores, reduce their annual land tax, rebuild walls and towers, relax trade restrictions, dismiss the local county's assistant regional commander, and receive permission to settle on Pearl River shore opposite Guangzhou. Jiang, a member of Xu's pro-Western group, was maligned and accused of having embezzled from the funds set aside for the foreign mercenaries. More importantly, the major Guangzhou merchants, fearing the possibility that closer ties to Portugal might end their monopoly on its trade, raised a subscription and reïmbursed the throne for its expenses in hiring and returning the mercenaries. They were also anxious about reducing the defenses of the Portuguese settlement at a time when the less-liked Dutch were still at open war with them; their fort had only finally been permitted in 1625 and remained minimal. The emperor criticized his officials for their erratic counsel but overturned Xu and ordered Cordeiro and Rodrigues do Campo's return. (Note: Needham describes Cordeiro and Rodrigues del Campo's companies as reaching Beijing before turning back after a short time.)

=== Shandong ===
The Jesuit Rodrigues continued north with a few others, upon the pretext that it was necessary that he deliver the expeditions' cannon and gifts for the emperor. Once in Beijing, he submitted a memorial denying Lu's accusations regarding Macao's demands and ambitions. He and his party then joined Correia, whose force had not been returned but sent southeast to the port city of Dengzhou in Shandong. There, he was continuing to train the Ming army in the use of Western cannon under the guidance of Governor Ignatius Sun, a Catholic convert and one of Paul Xu's protégés, trained in both geometry and gunnery and a warm supporter of their cause.

On 19 January 1632, poor treatment of Manchurian conscripts by Shandong's local officials and a failure to deliver their wages from Beijing on time led to their commanders Kong Youde and Geng Zhongming revolting against Governor Sun, who futilely attempted to negotiate with them for a peaceful resolution. On 11 February, they fully invested Dengzhou. (Note: Cooper describes them as beginning the siege in January at the start of their revolt.) Of the course of the siege, Teixeira and twelve other Portuguese manned their cannon and fired 19 times, killing about 600 or 700 of the mutineers. However, Teixeira was hit by an arrow while attempting to throw a grenade from the battlements and he died the next day, along with two of the other Portuguese. Traitors emerged within Sun's ranks and one secretly opened a gate of the fortress on 22 February, making further resistance futile. Nine more Portuguese were killed, 15 escaped only with serious injury, and Rodrigues—near seventy—survived only by jumping from the high city wall into the ocean below.

== Legacy ==
Although Sun was arrested and executed for his behavior during the mutiny, Correia was the subject of A Record of Gonçalo the Dutiful (公沙効忠紀, Gōngshā Xiàozhōng Jǐ), a Chinese paean to his bravery at Dongzhou written by João Rodrigues in the year after his death. A memorial by Rodrigues also secured an official statement from the War Ministry on 19 June 1632 which listed all Macao's services for China, including those performed by Correia. Xiong Mingyu, the Ming Minister of War, further gave Correia the posthumous title of Assistant Regional Commander and two of his men were also given the posthumous ranks of brigade commander and commandant in the Ming army.

== See also ==
- The Portuguese Empire & Portuguese Macao
- The Ming Empire, the Tianqi Emperor, & the Chongzhen Emperor
- Jesuit China missions & João Rodrigues
- Paul Xu, Ignatius Sun, Yuan Chonghuan, the military history of China before 1911, & hongyipao
- Kong Youde & Geng Zhongming
