= Wuqiao mutiny =

- Part of the Ming-Qing transition
Date	1632–1633
Location	Dengzhou and Laizhou
Result	Ming victory Some rebels defect to the Later Jin

Belligerents
Rebels	Ming dynasty

Commanders and leaders
Kong Youde; Geng Zhongming; Li Jiucheng †; Mao Chenglu †	Sun Yuanhua; Xu Congzhi †; Gao Qiqian; Wu Xiang; Wu Sangui; Zhu Dadian; Liu Zeqing; Chen Hongfan

Strength
100,000 infantry 10,000 cavalry	12,000

The Wuqiao mutiny (吳橋兵變) was a military revolt from 1631 to 1633 during the late years of the Ming dynasty, led by Kong Youde and Geng Zhongming. Both men were lieutenants under the command of general Mao Wenlong, the defender of Pi Island (Dongjiang), a strategically crucial island in the Yellow Sea that guarded the coastal land corridor into Joseon, a Ming tributary at the flank of the Manchu-led Later Jin (which later became the Qing dynasty). The revolt was eventually crushed by Ming government forces, although many surviving rebels managed to flee across the Bohai Sea and surrendered to the Manchu, significantly upsetting the balance of power between the Ming and the Later Jin.

== Background ==
After Mao was executed in 1629 by Yuan Chonghuan, many of his old subordinates in Dongjiang were alienated by the new command and lost faith in the Ming cause. Geng Zhongming started raiding Joseon (which was previously defended by Mao) for supplies, but was found out and jailed by his newly appointed superior Huang Long. Zhongming's brother Zhongyu revolted against Huang and imprisoned him. Although Huang was eventually released, he was impeached by Sun Yuanhua for embezzling army funds. Conflicts between officers led to Kong Youde and Geng Zhongming being transferred to Dengzhou in Shandong under the command of Sun Yuanhua (a protégé of Xu Guangqi), where they were put in charge of firearm and artillery training for newly recruited troops.

== Mutiny ==
In late 1631, Kong was called in to reinforce Ming forces at the Battle of Dalinghe, but his soldiers (mostly conscripts from Liaodong region) were under supplied and underpaid, and had difficulties obtaining provisions due to conflicts with the Shandong locals. While passing the town of Wuqiao, the regiment was bogged down by bad weather, and the local magistrate deliberately allowed the merchants to close the markets and refused to sell the troops provisions. One of the starving soldiers stole a chicken from the household of a powerful gentry named Wang Xiangchun, and Wang's servant had the soldier paraded and humiliated through the camp with an arrow impaled through the face. This enraged the other soldiers, who rioted and killed Wang's servant. This escalation prompted Wang's son to personally intervene and demand that all the perpetrators be harshly punished.

At the same time, Kong's subordinate Li Jiucheng had spent all the funds provided by Sun Yuanhua and feared getting into trouble, so he coerced Kong to mutiny. The mutineers sacked the Wang household, raided Jinan and fanned out to take Linyi, Ling County, Shanghe and Qingcheng, and captured Dengzhou on February 22, 1632 when Geng Zhongming defected to the mutineers and handed over the city. Sun Yuanhua was captured but managed to convince Kong to surrender peacefully, however the amnesty decree was suppressed by censorial inspector Wang Daochun, who held a hardline approach to the rebels. Growing impatient, Kong resumed his rebellion, but released Sun out of their friendship. However, the failure to defend Dengzhou led to the impeachment of Sun Yuanhua by his political enemies. He was accused of treason, which led to torture in prison and eventually his execution in 1633.

After more victories, Kong's rebel forces arrived at Laizhou in March and began a 6-month siege. The Ming central government mobilized Gao Qiqian, Wu Xiang, and Wu Sangui with 12,000 men to relieve Laizhou. The rebel forces were eventually smashed and forced to retreat to Dengzhou, where the poorly provisioned survivors were reduced to cannibalism before Kong and Geng escaped by sea with their remaining followers, defecting to the Later Jin in the spring of 1633.

== Aftermath ==
The surviving rebels included many skilled laborers and veteran artillerymen, as well as large numbers of Hongyipao cannons, which was a huge boost to the siege warfare capability of the Jurchens, who previously could only rely on foot soldiers to attack Ming fortifications. Both Kong and Geng were appointed lords by Hong Taiji, who rejoiced at the defection of these high-profile Ming commanders.

== See also ==
- Three Feudatories

== Bibliography ==
- Swope, Kenneth M. (2009), A Dragon's Head and a Serpent's Tail: Ming China and the First Great East Asian War, 1592-1598, University of Oklahoma Press.
- Swope, Kenneth (2014), The Military Collapse of China's Ming Dynasty, Routledge
