= Kong Youde =

Chinese adventurer and general (died 1652)

Kong Youde (Chinese: 孔有德; pinyin: Kǒng Yǒudé; Manchu: ᡴᡠᠩ
ᡳᡠᠣ
ᡩᡝ; Transliteration of Manchu: kung ioo de; died August 7, 1652) was a Chinese adventurer and Ming dynasty military officer who served under the warlord Mao Wenlong until Mao's death in 1629. Subsequently, he worked for Sun Yuanhua, governor of Shandong, along with Geng Zhongming, his fellow and one of Mao's subordinates. When ordered by Sun to reinforce Zu Dashou at the Battle of Dalinghe in 1631, Kong and Geng mutinied, pillaging the countryside, sacking Dengzhou, and subsequently defecting to the Later Jin dynasty—in 1633. They were joined in 1634 by another former officer under Mao, Shang Kexi. Together, the three were known as the "Three Miners from Shandong" and participated in many campaigns under the Qing dynasty, hastening the demise of the Ming.

== Life ==
=== Early career ===
Kong Youde was illiterate, but was known for his ferocity and martial skills in battle. He was a loyal follower of the semi-independent warlord Mao Wenlong, who operated in Liaodong under nominal Ming supervision. In an effort to unify Ming forces on the northern frontier under a single command structure, general Yuan Chonghuan trapped and executed Mao Wenlong in 1629. Although Yuan had hoped to recruit Mao's followers into the regular Ming army, some including Kong Youde and Geng Zhongming refused to join him. Kong Youde and Geng Zhongming had close relationship, some historical sources indicate that they were sworn brothers, both of them left instead for Dengzhou to work for Sun Yuanhua. While serving in Dengzhou, Kong and Geng were among the officers who learned to use the new European cannons Sun had obtained from Macau.

=== Mutiny ===
In September 1631, the Later Jin dynasty laid siege to the northern fortress of Dalinghe. Sun ordered Kong Youde to reinforce Ming general Zu Dashou, who was trapped at Dalinghe. Rather than join the battle, Kong decided to loot the surrounding countryside instead. In February 1632, Kong Youde attacked Sun's garrison at Dengzhou, where Geng Zhongming was stationed. Geng turned on Sun Yuanhua, and Dengzhou fell to Kong Youde's assault. Among the casualties of the battle were several of the Portuguese artillery specialists from Macau who had been training the Ming troops. Kong and Geng took the Western cannons. Sun was allowed to leave unharmed, but was subsequently executed for desertion after arriving at the Ming capital of Beijing.

=== Defection ===
After capturing Dengzhou, Kong Youde besieged the Ming garrison at Laizhou. The Ming court responded by sending a force under the command of Zu Dashou's brother-in-law, Wu Xiang, accompanied by his son Wu Sangui. In 1633, Kong and Geng fled Shandong via the sea. After fighting several naval battles against Ming and Korean forces along the way, they landed in Liaodong with about 14,000 followers. They then switched allegiance to the Manchu Later Jin dynasty, and presented their Dengzhou artillery to the khan, Hong Taiji. Their former associate under Mao Wenlong, Shang Kexi, soon joined them in 1634. Hong Taiji renamed the Later Jin dynasty to the Qing dynasty in 1636.

=== Later career ===
Kong Youde participated in the invasion of Shanxi in 1634. Kong, Geng, and Shang Kexi all participated in the second Manchu invasion of Korea. Kong and Shang also participated in the siege of Jinzhou, against Zu Dashou. All three men were also involved in the war against Li Zicheng's short-lived Shun dynasty. Kong Youde continued fighting against Southern Ming forces throughout the 1640s as the Qing dynasty consolidated its control over China proper, notably in Hunan and Guangxi.

In 1652, Kong Youde was battling Southern Ming armies in Guangxi when he was outflanked by the Ming loyalist general Li Dingguo. Having nowhere to escape, Kong committed suicide in Guilin. According to one of Wakeman's works, Kong was buried outside the Zhanyi Gate in Beijing. But it is unclear what he introduced as Zhanyi Gate exactly was, and in fact Kong's body was buried outside Fuchengmen in Beijing.

== Family ==
Kong Youde claimed to be a descendant of Confucius. This claimed descent, repeated in his Qing era biographies, was likely a fabrication. It was rejected by the officially recognized descendants of Confucius in Shandong, and he was barred by the family from entering the Cemetery of Confucius to pay his respects.

His daughter Kong Sizhen married General Sun Yanling and supported his participation of the Revolt of the Three Feudatories.
