= Sun Yuanhua =

Chinese intellectual of the Ming dynasty

- Traditional Chinese: 孫元化
- Simplified Chinese: 孙元化
Transcriptions
Standard Mandarin
- Hanyu Pinyin: Sūn Yuánhuā
- Wade–Giles: Sun Yüan-hua

Courtesy names

Chuyang
- Traditional Chinese: 初陽
- Simplified Chinese: 初阳
- Literal meaning: Initial Sunniness
Transcriptions
Standard Mandarin
- Hanyu Pinyin: Chūyáng
- Wade–Giles: Ch‘u-yang

Huodong
- Traditional Chinese: 火東
- Simplified Chinese: 火东
- Literal meaning: Fiery East; Ignatius
Transcriptions
Standard Mandarin
- Hanyu Pinyin: Huǒdōng
- Wade–Giles: Huo-tung

Sun Yuanhua (1581 or 1582 – 7 September 1632), also known as Ignatius Sun, (Note: In period sources, this name was also sometimes written "Ignatius Sung".) was a Chinese mandarin under the late Ming. A Catholic convert, he was a protégé of Paul Xu (né Xu Guangqi). Like his mentor, he advocated repelling the Manchu invasion by modernizing Chinese weaponry and wrote treatises on geometry and military science influenced by the Jesuits' European knowledge. From 1630 to 1632, he served as governor of Denglai, a Ming district around Dengzhou and Laizhou in northern Shandong. He was deposed by the mutiny of Kong Youde and Geng Zhongming, after which he was arrested and executed by the Ming for having failed to crush their rebellion with sufficient severity.

== Names ==
Sun Yuanhua initially went by the courtesy name Chuyang. Upon his conversion, he adopted the baptismal name Ignatius (Portuguese: Inácio) in honor of St Ignatius, the founder of the Jesuit order. He then adopted the courtesy name Huodong, which loosely translates it.

== Life ==
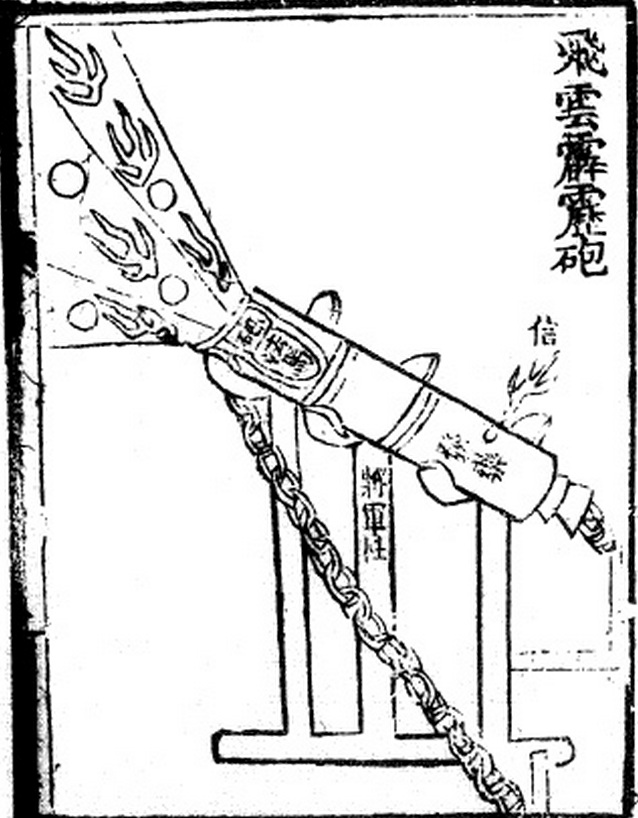
A 14th-century Chinese illustration of the "flying-cloud thunderclap-eruptor", a native Ming cannon capable of firing cast-iron bombs filled with gunpowder (proto-shells)

Sun was born in Jiading in the province of Southern Zhili (now within Shanghai) in 1581 or 1582 during the late Ming. He passed Southern Zhili's provincial exam and became a juren in 1612. (Note: Huang claims 1611.) Converting to Roman Catholicism under the influence of the Chinese Jesuit mission, he became a protégé of Paul Xu, who instructed him in western mathematics and use of firearms.

Sun joined Xu and his fellow converts Leo Li and Michael Yang in writing memorials supporting Christianity in response to the harshly condemnatory memorials published by Shen Que (沈㴶) in 1616 and 1617 after he became the vice-minister of the Department of Rites at Nanjing. In the end, the Wanli Emperor sided with Shen: A number of Chinese converts were jailed; Alphonso Vagnoni and Álvarõ de Semedo, the Jesuit leaders at Nanjing, were imprisoned and then expelled; and the Catholic buildings in Nanjing were demolished.

After the fall of Guangning (now Beizhen in Liaoning) to the Manchu, Sun Yuanhua published two memorials advocating the use of European-style cannon to defend the capital and the northeastern borders and passes. He argued that "at this stage the army is terrified of the enemy. If we are not under the shelter of garrisons, our condition will not be stable [and,] if we do not use telescopes and excellent cannon to strike first from a distance of 10 li or more, then the enemy will not be warded off." Most such military memorials were composed by mandarins unfamiliar with war and consisted of general platitudes and historical anecdotes, often dating back to the Zhou or earlier. Despite a general sense of cultural superiority and desire for self-sufficiency—evident in modern artillery becoming generally known as "red-barbarian cannon"—and although Sun failed Beijing's imperial examination for 1622, his memorials attracted important attention at the War Ministry because of the strength of his arguments and the great and familiar detail he included concerning the construction and use of modern cannon and fortifications. On 15 March 1622, the supervising censor Hou Zhenyang, working at the Office of Scrutiny for Personnel, composed a memorial lauding Sun's talent: "Sun Yuanhua... should be employed urgently to cast cannon and to construct garrisons... Let [him] investigate and measure the terrain, pin down the routes that should be followed, establish a platform [for cannon] at each juncture and then, with the cost of one platform as a base of reference for the others, the entrances to the passes will be rock-safe!... Let Yuanhua teach the tactics to the generals and commanders, [since] only the people who actually make the cannon can teach how to operate cannon." Hou was dismissed because of a memorial against Shen Que and the "Eunuch Party" but not before his proposals regarding Sun were put into practice. The war minister and grand secretary Sun Chengzong offered Sun Yuanhua a place on the ministry staff but acceded to his demands to take up responsibility in the war zone, making him a "military commissioner responsible for armament in the field". A general modernization program was delayed, however, when a 1623 demonstration of foreign artillery at Beijing went awry and a piece exploded, killing a Portuguese artillerist and three Chinese. Though subdued, official interest continued: Yuan Chonghuan began supporting Sun's policies in 1626.

An important meeting was held at Sun's Jiading estate around 1627, where Andrea Palmeiro, Xu, Sun, Yang, and eleven Jesuit missionaries planned the future of Christian expansion in China, including the status of Chinese rites and which Chinese name should be used for the Christian God.

Following Xu and Li's 1629 memorials, the Portuguese captain Gonçalo Teixeira Corrêa was permitted to bring ten artillery pieces and four "excellent bombards" across China to begin the training of Ming troops in European-style cannon. Further reinforcements were turned back at Nanchang in Jiangxi, owing to an outpouring of official complaints when a sudden illness removed the threat of a Manchu assault on Beijing. The merchants in Guangzhou were anxious lest their special monopolies on Portuguese trade be curtailed but a memorials of Lu Zhaolong singled Sun Yuanhua out for particular condemnation because of his overly fond treatment of the foreigners.

In 1630, Sun received the title of Shandong's Assistant Surveillance Commissioner for "having penetrated deep into the camp of the enemy". Liang Tingdong, the minister of war, offered him the post of governor of Denglai (t 登萊, s 登莱, Dēnglái) in northern Shandong, but Sun was hesitant. He composed a memorial stating

I believe the Court formerly made Denglai into a kind of commission and the Dongjiang Islands into a kind of military post. You now want your servant to fill this vacancy but if the Ministry of Personnel does not provide full pay for its soldiers, the Ministry of Works its necessary equipment, and the Ministry of War its horses then from a military perspective this is all vacuous... Moreover, even disregarding the rebelliousness of the general of the islands, it is not easy to carry out orders there. Your servant could not accept the position even if he were not ill. How much worse is it that he is now ill, unable to straddle a saddle or hold a brush.

Rather than assuage Sun's concerns, he was ultimately ordered to take up the post at Dengzhou (now Penglai) with a force of 8000 Liaoning conscripts and the Portuguese instructors. There, Sun worked with Gonçalo and his translator, the elderly Jesuit João Rodrigues, to train Ming troops to repel the continuing Manchu invasion. He also began manufacturing his own cannon in the Portuguese style. In a report to the capital, Sun complained of the Liaoning refugees who had fled to his district in the hundreds of thousands that they "had seen few wars" and were thus "weak, deceitful, and completely unreliable".

In early 1631, the Korean diplomat Jeong Duwon visited Dengzhou while traveling to Beijing by sea, war having blocked the usual overland route from Seoul. Sun introduced him to Rodrigues, whose interviews and gifts on the occasion have been credited with the introduction of western religion, science, geography, firearms, and jurisprudence to Korea.

On 19 January 1632, Governor Sun's subordinates Kong Youde and Geng Zhongming mutinied. Both had previously served together under Mao Wenlong, a Ming general executed for using his post overseeing the Yellow Sea to support and conduct smuggling throughout northern China. Rather than immediately attacking Kong and Geng, Sun attempted to negotiate a peaceful resolution of their differences. This proved futile and, on 11 February, their forces besieged Dengzhou. When the city fell a little over a week later, Captain Corrêa and 11 other Portuguese were killed in battle, 15 escaped only with serious injury, and Rodrigues survived only by jumping from the high city wall into the sea. Sun was spared by Kong and Geng for his earlier leniency but, for the same reason, he was then condemned and arrested by the Ming government. Xu, despite now holding some of the highest posts in China for his work reforming the calendar, was unable to secure clemency through memorials absolving Sun for Kong and Geng's actions. Sun's court martial condemned him to death and he was executed shortly thereafter on 7 September 1632.

== Works ==
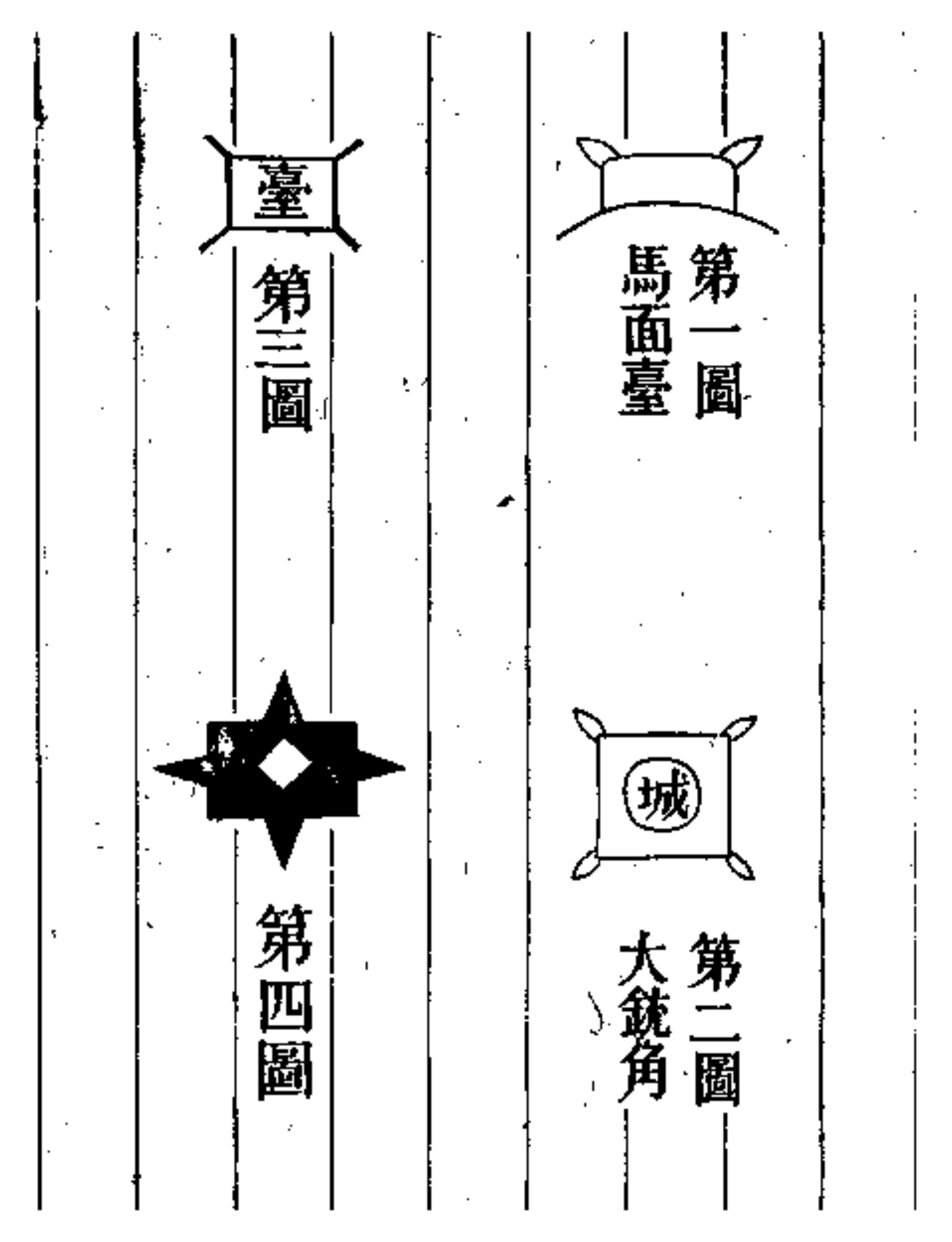
A page of diagrams from Western-style Masterpieces

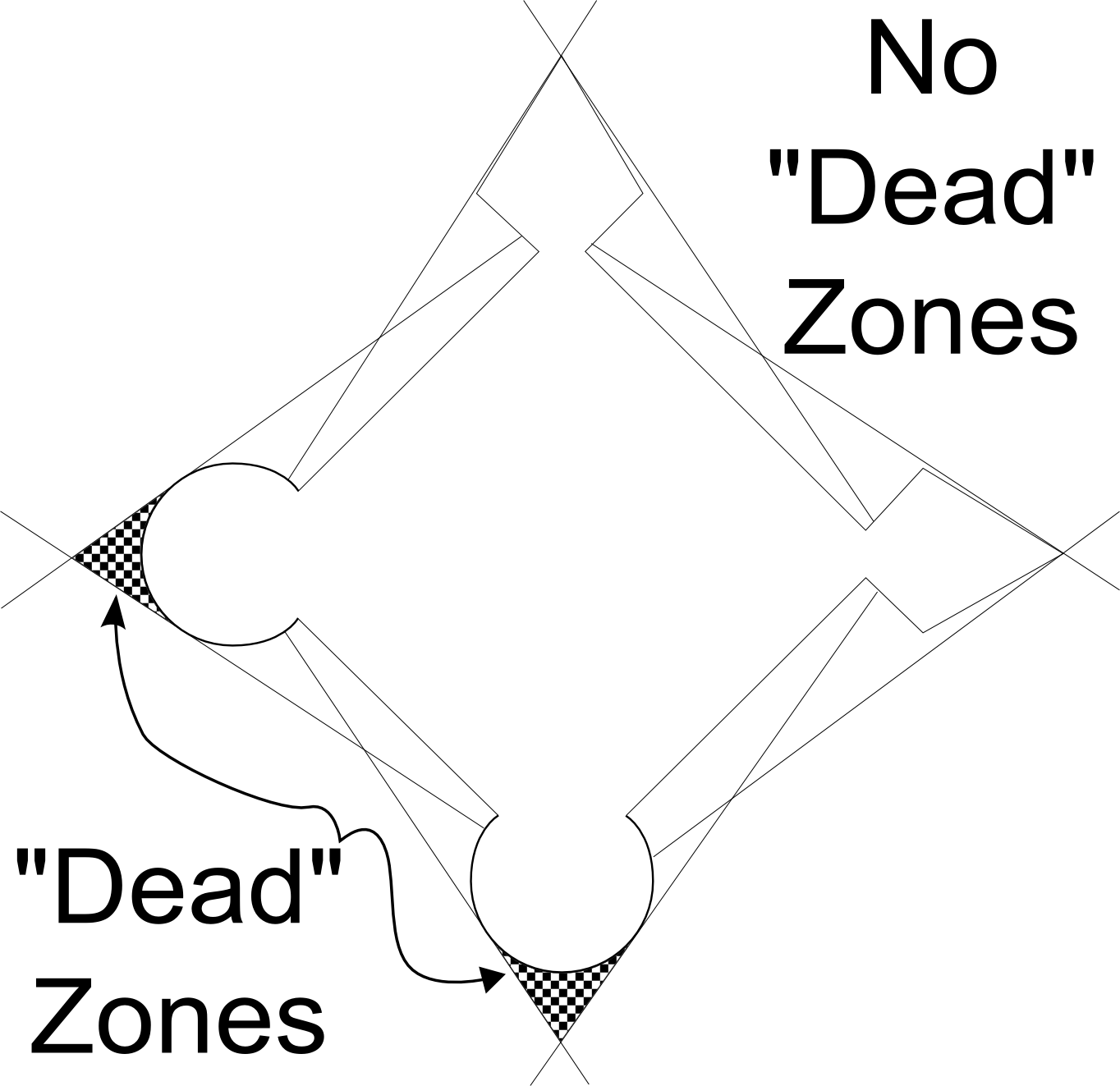
A diagram comparing the lines of fire of traditional rounded bastions against the angled design developed during the European Renaissance.

Sun assisted his mentor Paul Xu with the editing of his trigonometry textbook Principles of Right Triangles (t 句股義, s 勾股义, Gōugǔ Yì). Like Xu, Sun also wrote his own treatises on military science and geometry, incorporating the European knowledge being introduced by their Jesuit instructors.

The mathematical works included the Miscellanea on Western Learning (Xixue Zazhu), How to Do Geometry (t 幾何用法, s 几何用法, Jǐhé Yòngfǎ), and Western Calculation (太西算要, Tàixī Suànyāo).

One military work was his Jingwu Quanbian. His 1632 Western-style Masterpieces (t 西法神機, s 西法神机, Xīfǎ Shénjī) became famous, advocating for the use of modernized fortifications as well as firearms. Sun was particularly impressed by the angled bastions (t 銳角, s 锐角, ruìjiǎo) of Renaissance Europe's star forts, writing that, "with the angled bastion, the enemy is kept out beyond the walls and, when subjected to our attack, there is nowhere our guns cannot reach and the enemy has no way to approach." His efforts to construct them in the 1620s were apparently neutralized by factional feuds within the Ming government and turnover of the responsible officials, however, and they did not become widely employed in China.

== Legacy ==
Kong and Geng, after considering their options, threw in their lot with Manchuria and rose to prominence under the Qing Empire it established. The Manchu welcomed their captured artillery: Despite continuing to call them hongyipao, they adjusted one of the name's characters to make them "red-coated cannon".

The Xu and Sun families remained close. Sun Yuanhua's niece Ms Wang later married Xu's grandson Erdou. (Note: The Wending Gong Xingshi composed by Paul Xu's son Xu Ji calls her Sun's daughter but this is apparently in error.) A detailed Biography of Vice-Censor-in-Chief Sun was composed by Gui Zhuang (1613–1673). Gui knew Sun Yuanhua's grandson Sun Zhimi and wrote the preface for his 1671 Jiangxing Zashi.

Sun is the tragic protagonist of Ling Li's 1996 novel Qingcheng Qingguo.

== See also ==
- Christianity in China
- Jesuit China mission
- List of converts to Christianity from Confucianism
