= Šanaha =

Šanaha (Manchu: ᡧᠠᠨᠠᡥᠠ, romanized: Šanaha; d. 1687) was a Qing military commander of the Irgen Gioro clan and a member of the Manchu Plain Yellow Banner. He participated in the Qing conquest campaigns and later played a notable role in suppressing the Revolt of the Three Feudatories.

== Biography ==
Šanaha's father Sahu joined Nurhaci's tribe from hometown Laibu. Šanaha first distinguished himself during the suppression of the rebellion of Jiang Xiang (姜鑲) in Datong in 1649, for which he was granted the warrior title and hereditary rank of baitalabure hafan. He later earned further promotions of noble ranks to adaha hafan through his service in the Zhoushan campaign. During the Revolt of the Three Feudatories (1673–1681), he fought in Jiangxi against the rebel forces of Geng Jingzhong and subsequently commanded Qing troops in Hunan and Yunnan. He achieved notable victories over the rebel commanders Xia Guoxiang (夏國相), Ma Bao (馬寶), and Wu Shifan, including the defeat of an elephant corps during the final Qing campaign in Yunnan. Following the suppression of the rebellion, Šanaha was promoted to Commander of the Plain Yellow Mongol Banner and became a Deliberative Minister (議政大臣). He retired due to illness in 1687 and died shortly thereafter. His hereditary title was inherited by his son Shangde (尚德).
