= Mao Wenlong =

Chinese general (1576–1629)

- 毛文龍
- Born: 10 February 1576; Shangcheng District, Hangzhou, Zhejiang
- Died: 24 July 1629 (aged 53); Lüshunkou District, Dalian, Liaoning
- Other name: Zhennan (振南)
- Occupation: General

Mao Wenlong (Chinese: 毛文龍; pinyin: Máo Wénlóng; 10 February 1576 – 24 July 1629), courtesy name Zhennan, was a Chinese military general of the Ming dynasty, best known for commanding an independent detachment based in Dongjiang, a strategically important island in the Yellow Sea that defended the coastal corridor into the Ming tributary Joseon, where he engaged harassing naval and amphibious battles against the Manchu-led Later Jin (which later became the Qing dynasty). He was also known for excelling in artillery warfare and successfully incorporating Western-style tactics into the Chinese military.

Mao later fell victim to power struggles with the newly appointed governor Yuan Chonghuan, who had him summarily executed upon the latter's arrival to take over the command of Liaodong. His death effectively destroyed the morale of his old subordinates, many of whom mutinied and defected two years later, and led to the de facto collapse of the Dongjiang defensive line. This eventuated in the Qing invasion of Joseon at the end of 1636, allowing the Qing forces to eliminate further threat in the rear, and paved the way for Qing's successful invasion and conquest of China proper two decades later.

== Early life ==
Mao was born into a merchant family in Hangzhou and reported worked as a fortuneteller in his youth. When he was 29, he became an adopted son to a childless paternal uncle in Anshan so he travelled north for Liaodong. Along the way he visited a maternal uncle in the capital Beijing, who recommended him to Li Chengliang. He joined the Ming military and participated in a military selection exam in late 1605, in which he ranked sixth among the recruits. For his military talents in terrain analysis, Mao was promoted to the rank of an officer, and became the commander of Aiyang in 1608.

Mao did not gain any further promotion for over a decade, prompting him to even consider discharge from military service. However, in 1619 a new governor named Xiong Tingbi (熊廷弼) was appointed, who ordered Mao to conduct scorched earth operations in border areas in response to increasing Jurchen incursions, allowing him to gain a long-waited promotion the following year. After Xiong was impeached and removed in political struggles, the new governor Yuan Yingtai (袁應泰) reassigned Mao to manage logistics at the Shanhai Pass, where he gained another promotion for works involving gunpowder production.

== Career against Jurchens ==
In 1621, Later Jin forces invaded Liaodong and defeated the Ming garrisons in the Battle of Shen-Liao, capturing the strategic cities of Shenyang and Liaoyang. Over 100 of Mao's relatives in Anshan was massacred by the Jurchens, prompting him to sign up to a recruitment call by the Liaodong governor Wang Huazhen (王化貞) to organize a volunteer detachment operating in territories at the Jurchen's rear.

Later in July, Mao led 197 men into Later Jin territories and attacked the Changshan Islands and various other islands along a 2,000-li stretch of coast line, capturing several enemy officers. His detachment arrived at Zhenjiang (modern day Dandong) on July 14, and attacked the city at night, capturing several Manchu nobles, ambushing and killing the Jurchen commanders who was returning from raids on the surrounding towns. The success of this Battle of Fort Zhenjiang led to numerous other fortresses surrendering to Mao, but his forces were still forced to retreat after no Ming reinforcements were send to bolster up defenses against Jurchen counterattacks.

After forcing to give up Zhenjiang, Mao started to based his operations on Pi Island (the modern day Ka Island) and Tieshan to recruit refugees into his troops. In June 1622, Mao was appointed the General Commander of the Liao Region (平遼將軍總兵官) by the Ming court, and in February the next year was promoted to Governor and Marshal with a sword of state granted by Tianqi Emperor as proof of authority. Under Mao's management, Dongjiang became an sizable settlement hosting hundreds of thousands of refugees who were displaced by the Jurchen invasion. Mao would then launch repeated raids into Jurchen-controlled Liaodong, at the same time trading with the Koreans and the Europeans, making Dongjiang a strategic threat to the Later Jin's flank.

In the summer of 1623, after receiving reports that Nurhaci was planning on attacking the Ming dynasty, Mao sent four divisions to attack the Later Jin from four different fronts, which forced the Jurchens to abandon their campaign. Mao's divisions also managed gain a foothold on the southern Liaodong Peninsula, recruiting over 4,000 militiamen from the refugees and successfully recapturing the towns of Jīnzhou and Lüshun and large quantities of Later Jin weaponries. In September, Mao received reports that Nurhaci was planning to attack the defensive line around Shanhai Pass, so he led 30,000 men to raid the old Later Jin capital Hetu Ala, annihilating all the Jurchen defenders and forcing Nurhaci to turn back east with 40,000 troops. before withdrawing. In October, Mao's forces again utilized the civilians' hatred towards the Jurchen invaders and recaptured the towns of Fuzhou and Yongning.

In the beginning of 1624, the Jurchens traversed across sea ice and attacked Lüshun with over 10,000 troops. Mao's troops managed to withstand the siege and defeated the attacks using an ambush. Nurhaci then sent an emissary to discuss peace deal, but Mao arrested the messenger and handed him to the Ming court.

In January 1625, Wu Zhiwang (武之望), the Governor of the Deng-Lai, appealed to have a canal built between Jīnzhou and Lüshun, and pressured the local garrisons to start the construction project without considering the military situation. The news got leaked to the Later Jin, who attacked and captured the two towns, killing Mao's commanders Zhang Pan (張盤) and Zhu Guochang (朱國昌) who were in charge of the canal construction. Mao responded by sending troops to cut off the Later Jin supply line, causing the enemy to retreat and recapturing the lost towns. However, Governor Wu took the opportunity to send in his own men into Lüshun and claimed the achievements for himself, but withdrew from the garrison in winter in fear of another Jurchen attack and suggested to the Ming court to abandon defense altogether. Mao argued for regarrison and gained the support of the Minister of Defense Wang Zaijin (王在晉) and other officials, who praised Mao's garrisons in Dongjiang as an "offshore Great Wall (海外長城)". Tianqi Emperor himself also praised Mao for his work "making the barbarians troubled and unable to head west". Nurhaci sent messengers in attempt to convince Mao to defect, but Mao steadfastly refused.

In January 1626, Nurhaci attacked Ningyuan (modern day Xingcheng), and Mao sent troops to attack Haizhou and Shenyang (which was Later Jin's capital), preventing the Jurchens' from fully committed to their invasion westwards. In June, Nurhaci again sent messengers trying to turn Mao to his side, but Mao reported the letter to the Ming court and in August organized an assassination attempt when received reports from Geng Zhongming (who was serving as a spy in Shenyang) that Nurhaci was visiting a hot spring, but the latter escaped the attempt.

== Execution ==
After Nurhaci died in late August 1626, his eighth son Hong Taiji inherited the throne. Hong Taiji changed his father's way of ruling to a more ethnically tolerant policy and started recruiting Han Chinese into the ranks of Later Jin, which helped solidifying the Jurchens' control of Lower Manchuria and thus reduced the success rate of Mao's raids. Meanwhile, Tianqi Emperor died in late September 1627 and was succeeded by his overambitious half-brother Chongzhen Emperor, whose impatience led him to have unrealistic expectations. In early 1628, after purging Wei Zhongxian and restoring the Donglin control within the Ming court, Chongzhen appointed Yuan Chonghuan (who was previously removed by Wei's party) as the new Minister of Defense. In July, Yuan boasted to Chongzhen that he could "recover the Liao region in five years", which pleased Chongzhen enough to grant him a sword of state as a proof of supreme authority.

However, Yuan soon decided that Mao Wenlong, who also held a sword of state granted by the late Tianqi Emperor, was becoming a problem for him. Mao was already impeached by other government ministers as his garrisons in Dongjiang were getting too costly for the Treasury, and there were accusations of insubordination and corruption against his officers. After Mao refused to let Yuan appoint officials to audit the finance of his troops in early 1629, Yuan decided to get rid of Mao.

On June 1, 1629, Yuan arrived in Lüshun to discuss matters with Mao, but after three days of negotiation Mao still refused to let Yuan appoint and manage the logistics of his garrison. Yuan then trying to convince Mao to retire, who rejected the offer citing that he was more experienced to deal with the affairs of Liaodong and Joseon. Two days later, Yuan pretended to invite Mao to review an archery training, and had him seized and his uniform stripped off. When Mao protested, Yuan presented his own sword of state and announced that Mao had "twelve crimes", and then had him summarily executed in front of the whole camp.

To prevent rioting and mutiny among the Dongjiang troops, Yuan then announced that Mao would be the only one to answer for the accused crimes, and all others will be exempted from any charges. Yuan then appointed the command to Mao's deputy Chen Jisheng (陳繼盛), and increased Dongjiang's budget to 180,000 taels of silver. He then organized a proper burial for Mao.

=== Aftermath ===
The Later Jin celebrated the news of Mao's death, with "drinking parties" being reportedly organized. Hong Taiji immediately organized a raid through the Yan Mountains later that year, completely circumventing Yuan's heavily invested Shanhai Pass-Ningyuan-Jinzhou defensive line. This attack, known as the Jisi Incident, was the first time the Later Jin forces successfully invaded the North China Plain, with the Jurchens ransacking and looting virtually unchallenged to the outskirts of Beijing. Following that, the Jurchens no longer had any concerns committing to invading westwards, and also successfully invaded the Korean Peninsula in 1636.

In his report to the Emperor, Yuan justified his decision to execute Mao with the accusations of latter refusing to accept supervisors, overbudgeting, misreporting of manpower, and killing civilians as falsified enemy kills. Chongzhen Emperor grew suspicious over Yuan's claims, but accepted the situation and did not enquire any further. The matter of the Mao Wenlong affair was however brought up again months later after the humiliating Jisi Incident, and became a major factor for Yuan's own impeachment, prosecution and execution by a thousand cuts the following year.

Mao's old subordinates, whose loyalty to the Ming dynasty largely relied on their personal affiliation to Mao, were disheartened and lost faith in the cause against the Jurchens. Many of them mutinied and defected within just a few years, among them Kong Youde, Geng Jingzhong and Shang Kexi, who were instrumental in the Qing conquest of China two decades later.

== Political criticisms ==
Mao is sometimes blamed for the Later Jin invasion of Joseon. He was known for operating against the Later Jin dynasty from bases within the Joseon dynasty, a Ming ally at that time. When the Later Jin forces mounted a punitive expedition into Joseon, Mao ordered a general retreat of all Ming forces. This angered many Beijing merchants who had previously traded with the Korean Peninsula.

Mao never dared to drag major Later Jin cities into war even when there was a strategic advantage in doing so. In this way Mao was able to bring to bear the influence of many powerful Ming officials against Yuan Chonghuan (1584–1630), a fellow Ming military commander.

Mao engaged in widespread smuggling using the Ming marine corps, contributing heavily to the booming economy of northern China. He was eventually caught for smuggling and executed by Yuan Chonghuan, a fellow military commander who had been conferred the imperial sword of absolute authority by the last Ming emperor. It is believed that Mao's death led in part to an economic downturn in the Ming dynasty.

== See also ==
- Wuqiao mutiny
- Kong Youde
- Geng Zhongming
- Shang Kexi
