= Wu Yingxiong =

Qing dynasty politician

- Born: 1634
- Died: 18 May 1674 (aged 39–40); Beijing
- Spouse: Princess Kechun (m. 1653)
- Issue: Wu Shilin; Wu Shifan
Posthumous name
- Emperor Xiaogong (孝恭皇帝)
- Father: Wu Sangui
- Mother: Empress Zhang

Wu Yingxiong (simplified Chinese: 吴应熊; traditional Chinese: 吳應熊; pinyin: Wu Yingxiong; Wade–Giles: Wu Ying-Hsiung; 1634 – 18 May 1674) was a Chinese aristocrat and the eldest son of Chinese military general Wu Sangui who was instrumental in the fall of the Ming dynasty and the expansion of the Qing dynasty into the Central Plain in 1644.

== Biography ==
Wu Yingxiong was born to Wu Sangui and his wife Lady Zhang, by the time Count and Countess of Pingxi (平西伯). In 1644, his father was granted the title of Prince Pingxi (平西王; translated as "Prince Who Pacifies the West") after opening the gates of the Great Wall of China at Shanhai Pass to let Qing forces into China proper. Wu Yingxiong was left in the Manchu court as a hostage in 1648 when his father's army marched to Southwest China to fight against the Ming troop. Five years later, in 1653, he was created a viscount and married Princess Kechun (恪純公主,1642–1705), the youngest half-sister of Shunzhi Emperor. The couple had three sons and at least one daughter.

In December 1673, Wu Sangui and other two princes revolted and declared civil war known as the Revolt of the Three Feudatories. As soon as the news reached Beijing, Wu Yingxiong and his sons were put into prison as hostage. Despite the fact that Wu was an uncle-by-marriage of the Manchu Kangxi Emperor, he was led to death on 18 May 1674 at Beijing, where he along with his eldest son Wu Shilin (吴世霖) was executed by strangulation. The rest of his sons were also executed in 1680 when the war ended.

Wu Shifan (吴世璠), the only surviving son of Wu Yingxiong, gave his father the posthumous title of Emperor Xiaogong (孝恭皇帝) when he inherited Wu Sangui's throne in 1678.
