= Hongyipao =

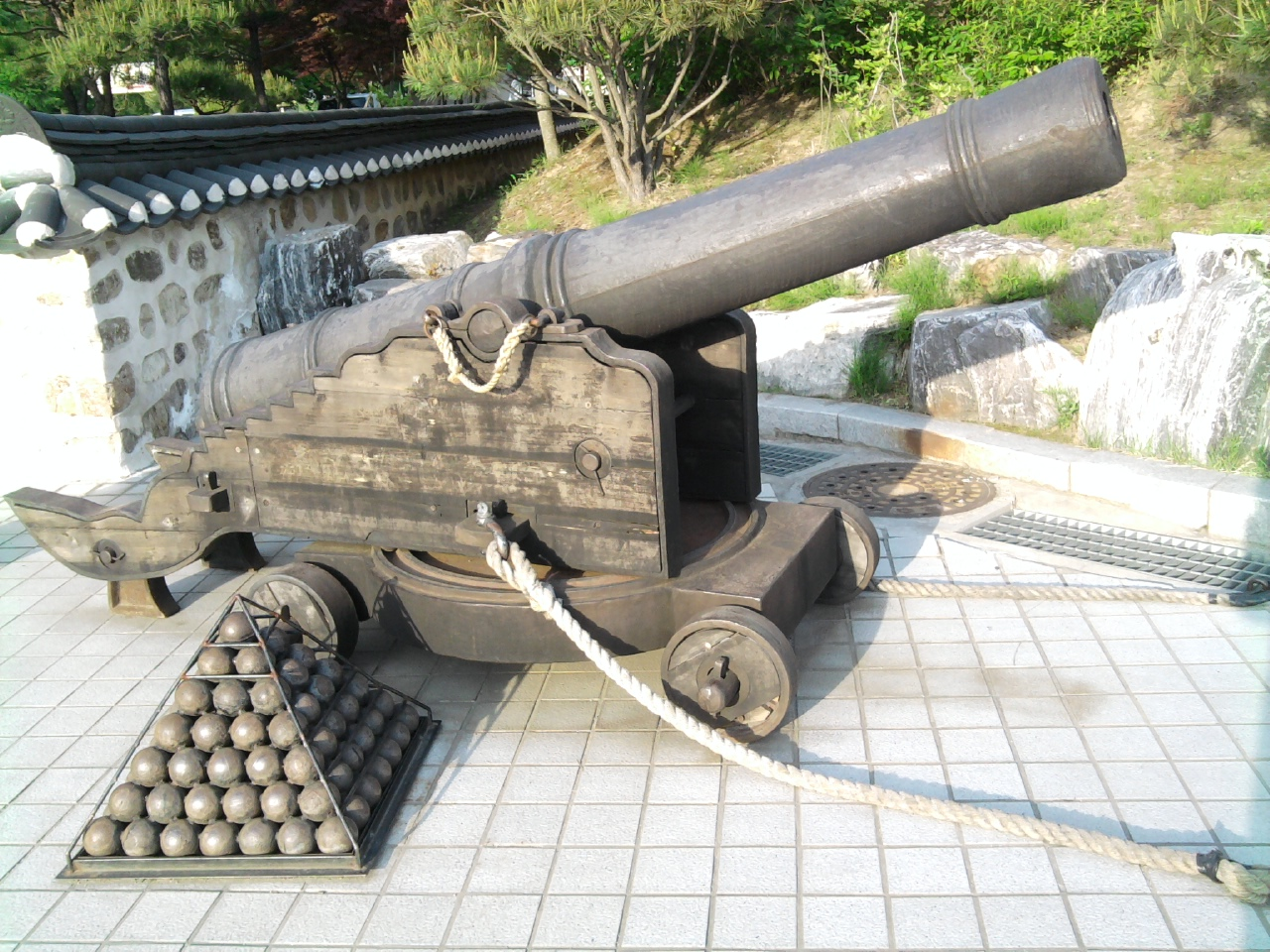
- Hongyipao displayed at Hwaseong Fortress
- Type: Smoothbore muzzle-loading culverin
- Place of origin: Portugal

Service history
- In service: Early 17th – late 19th centuries
- Used by: Ming dynasty Qing dynasty Joseon
- Wars: Manchu conquest of China

Production history
- Produced: 17th to 19th centuries

Specifications
- Mass: 1,800 kilograms (4,000 lb)
- Length: 2.15 metres (7.1 ft)
- Caliber: 12 centimetres (4.7 in)
- Barrels: 1
- Effective firing range: 700 metres (2,300 ft)
- Maximum firing range: 2 to 5 kilometres (1.2 to 3.1 mi)

Hongyipao (Chinese: 紅夷炮/紅衣炮; pinyin: hóngyípào; lit. 'red barbarian cannon/red coat cannon'; Vietnamese: hồng di pháo) was the Chinese name for Portuguese-style muzzle-loading culverins introduced to China and Korea from the Portuguese colony of Macau and with the help of Portuguese diplomats and advisors in the Beijing imperial Court like João Rodrigues.

== Name ==
The term "red barbarian cannon" comes probably from the huge burst of red fire produced by the explosion when fired, while the term barbarian was how the Portuguese were known since their arrival in southern China and Japan in the 16th century. The cannons were originally produced by the Portuguese at Macau in the largest cannon production center in the Far East, founded by António Bocarro

The Jurchens renamed the "red barbarian cannon" to "red coat cannon" (Chinese: 紅衣炮; pinyin: hóngyīpào) when it entered their arsenal because they found the term "barbarian" to be insulting, and were known as such in the Manchu Eight Banners.

== History ==
Breech loading swivel cannons from Portugal entered the Chinese weaponry after a Ming fleet defeated the Portuguese at the Battle of Xicaowan in 1521 and captured their guns as war booty. However it's possible that individuals in China had been able to purchase Portuguese style cannons even earlier from pirates.

Several Ming officials who supported the use of the new technology were Christian converts of the Jesuit mission, such as the influential minister Xu Guangqi and Sun Yuanhua in Shandong. After the defeat at the Battle of Sarhu, the Chinese approached the Portuguese for military assistance. In 1623, the Portuguese signed a contract with two Chinese to cast iron cannon at Macau. Macau became a source of European style cannons, with the Portuguese providing expertise in the bronze cannons and the Chinese in the iron cannons. An English cannon was dredged up from a ship that sank off the coast of China in 1621. Four cannons and four Portuguese were dispatched, but the Chinese only took the cannons and the Portuguese were turned back at Guangzhou. In 1624, seven Portuguese were allowed to go to northern China by the Ministry of War but they were sent back before long. A large contingent of soldiers, advisers, and equipment were dispatched from Macau in 1630 under Gonçalo Teixeira Correia but most of them were turned back as well. Local resistance by Cantonese merchants who feared that the Portuguese might obtain trading privileges for their military assistance and suspicious officials caused the Portuguese to be repeatedly turned back. In spite of this some advisers managed to make it north and cannons were sent beyond the Great Wall and used by generals such as Sun Chengzong and Yuan Chonghuan. They were used to repel Nurhaci at the Battle of Ningyuan in 1626. Yu Zigao, commander of Zhejiang and Fujian, ordered several "red-barbarian cannon" in 1624 prior to his expedition against the Dutch outpost on Penghu Island in the Pescadores. The Ming trained a new unit in European firearms but they were wiped out in the Wuqiao mutiny along with a dozen Portuguese advisers in 1632. In July 1642, a German Jesuit, Johann Adam Schall von Bell, was asked to establish a cannon foundry, resulting in 20 cannons capable of throwing a 40 pound shot.

After the Later Jin captured a Ming artillery unit at Yongping in 1629, they too began production of the hongyipao. The manufacture and use of the hongyipao within the Later Jin Banner armies were carried out by Han Chinese defectors called transl. zh – transl. ujen coohai (heavy troops). The Jurchen forces did not manufacture nor wield the guns themselves. The Later Jin army under Nurhaci's son Hong Taiji used these cannons along with the "generalissimo" cannons (also of Portuguese design) to great effect at the Battle of Dalinghe in 1631. Even after the later Jin became the Qing and Jurchens and Han defectors were reorganized into the Manchu Eight Banners, cannons and gunpowder weapons were still restricted exclusively to the Han Banners while the Manchu Banners avoided them. Han Bannermen specializing in artillery and muskets played a major role during Qing sieges of Ming fortifications.

By the 1680s, the Hongyipao had lost their place as the strongest weapons in the Qing arsenal, and were superseded by another type of cannon called the "miraculous-power general cannon."

== Chinese improvements ==
Chinese gunsmiths continued to modify "red barbarian" cannons after they entered the Ming arsenal, and eventually improved upon them by applying native casting techniques to their design. In 1642, Ming foundries merged their own casting technology with European cannon designs to create a distinctive cannon known as the "Dingliao grand general." Through combining the advanced cast-iron technique of southern China and the iron-bronze composite barrels invented in northern China, the Dingliao grand general cannons exemplified the best of both iron and bronze cannon designs. Unlike traditional iron and bronze cannons, the Dingliao grand general's inner barrel was made of iron, while the exterior of brass.

The resulting bronze-iron composite cannons were superior to iron or bronze cannons in many respects. They were lighter, stronger, longer lasting, and able to withstand more intensive explosive pressure. Chinese artisans also experimented with other variants such as cannons featuring wrought iron cores with cast iron exteriors. While inferior to their bronze-iron counterparts, these were considerably cheaper and more durable than standard iron cannons. Both types were met with success and were considered "among the best in the world" during the 17th century. The Chinese composite metal casting technique was effective enough that Portuguese imperial officials sought to employ Chinese gunsmiths for their cannon foundries in Goa, so that they could impart their methods for Portuguese weapons manufacturing. According to the soldier Albrecht Herport, who fought for the Dutch at the Siege of Fort Zeelandia, the Chinese "know how to make very effective guns and cannons, so that it’s scarcely possible to find their equal elsewhere."

Soon after the Ming started producing the composite metal Dingliao grand generals in 1642, Beijing was captured by the Manchu Qing dynasty and along with it all of northern China. The Manchu elite did not concern themselves directly with guns and their production, preferring instead to delegate the task to Chinese craftsmen, who produced for the Qing a similar composite metal cannon known as the "Shenwei grand general." However, after the Qing gained hegemony over East Asia in the mid-1700s, the practice of casting composite metal cannons fell into disuse until the dynasty faced external threats once again in the Opium War of 1840, at which point smoothbore cannons were already starting to become obsolete as a result of rifled barrels. After the Battle of Taku Forts (1860), the British reported with surprise that some of the Chinese cannons were of composite structure with similar features to the Armstrong Whitworth guns. Many of the Qing cannons deployed along the coast were forged in the 17th or early 18th century.

Although the southern Chinese started making cannons with iron cores and bronze outer shells as early as the 1530s, they were followed soon after by the Gujaratis, who experimented with it in 1545, the English at least by 1580, and Hollanders in 1629. However, the effort required to produce these weapons prevented them from mass production. The Europeans essentially treated them as experimental products, resulting in very few surviving pieces today. Of the currently known extant composite metal cannons, there are 2 English, 2 Dutch, 12 Gujarati, and 48 from the Ming-Qing period.

Ming era composite metal guns
Date	Bore (cm)	Length (cm)	Weight (kg)
1533	2.6 cm (1.0 in)	29.5 cm (11.6 in)	4.65 kg (10.3 lb)
1533	2.6 cm (1.0 in)	29.5 cm (11.6 in)	5 kg (11 lb)
1541	2.7 cm (1.1 in)	29.3 cm (11.5 in)	4.25 kg (9.4 lb)
1541			4.75 kg (10.5 lb)
1543	3.5 cm (1.4 in)	23 cm (9.1 in)	
1628	7.8 cm (3.1 in)	170 cm (67 in)	420 kg (930 lb)
1642	10.2 cm (4.0 in)	382 cm (150 in)	2,500 kg (5,500 lb)

Qing era composite metal cannons
Date	Bore (cm)	Length (cm)	Weight (kg)
1643	13 cm (5.1 in)	264 cm (104 in)	2,340 kg (5,160 lb)
1643	13 cm (5.1 in)	266 cm (105 in)	2,220 kg (4,890 lb)
1643	13 cm (5.1 in)	299 cm (118 in)	2,400 kg (5,300 lb)
1643	14.5 cm (5.7 in)		2,160 kg (4,760 lb)
1646	13 cm (5.1 in)	214 cm (84 in)	
1658	10 cm (3.9 in)	384 cm (151 in)	1,848 kg (4,074 lb)

== See also ==
- Korean cannon
- List of muzzle-loading guns
