= Geng Zhongming =

Prince of Jingnan
- Reign: 1649
- Successor: Geng Jimao
- Born: 1604; Gaizhou, Shandong, Ming dynasty (today's Gaizhou, Liaoning)
- Died: 1649 (aged 44–45); Ji'an, Jiangxi
- Occupation: Military general

Geng Zhongming (Chinese: 耿仲明; pinyin: Gěng Zhòngmíng; Wade–Giles: Keng^{3} Chung^{4}-ming^{2}; 1604–1649) was a Chinese military general who lived through the transition from the Ming (1368–1644) to the Qing (1644–1912) dynasty, during which he served both sides. His grandson Geng Jingzhong was one of the Three Feudatories who rebelled against Qing rule in the 1670s.

== Under Ming service ==
Geng Zhongming was described by historians as a tall, dark-complexioned man known for his bravery and resourcefulness. He had first served under the Ming warlord Mao Wenlong near the border of Joseon Korea. When Mao was executed for disobedience by Yuan Chonghuan in 1629, Geng and other military leaders such as Kong Youde refused to serve Yuan. With their troops, they fled by boat from the Liaodong Peninsula to Dengzhou (登州, which aministrative seat is in today's Penglai, Yantai) in Shandong. There, Geng was hired by Shandong governor Sun Yuanhua and allowed to join the Dengzhou garrison, where Sun was casting European-style cannons with the help of Portuguese soldiers. Sun gave Geng and Kong some training in the use of Portuguese artillery. In February 1632, Kong and Geng mutinied at Wuqiao, took over Dengzhou, established a rebel regime in the city (Kong was named "king"), and attempted to seize other towns in eastern Shandong, but were eventually driven out by a Ming relief force. In May 1633, they crossed the Bohai Gulf back to Liaodong and surrendered to Hong Taiji (1592–1643), the Jurchen Khan and future emperor of the Qing dynasty.

== Under Qing service ==
Like Kong, Geng was allowed to retain control of his own troops (about 6,000). In 1633, he helped the Manchus capture the town of Lüshun, and in 1634, he accompanied a raiding expedition near Datong in Shanxi. In 1636, he was given the title of Prince Huaishun (懷順王). He also led his troops into battle during the second Qing invasion of Korea. In 1642, his soldiers were incorporated into the Han Plain Yellow Banner.

In April 1644, bandit leader Li Zicheng captured the Ming imperial capital of Beijing and forced the Chongzhen Emperor (r. 1627–1644) to commit suicide. Under the leadership of Prince Regent Dorgon, the Qing pretended to take revenge on Li and attacked China. In late May 1644, Dorgon and his new ally, Ming general Wu Sangui, defeated Li at the Battle of Shanhai Pass and soon took Beijing from rebels. Geng Zhongming was sent to accompany Prince Dodo in pursuit of Li, who had retreated to his former headquarters in Xi'an (Shanxi). After Li's defeat, Geng participated in the Qing conquest of Jiangnan, then fought against the forces of the Southern Ming Prince of Gui (1644–1662), a loyalist movement attempting to restore the fallen Ming dynasty. When he returned to the capital in 1648, his title was changed to "Prince Who Pacifies the South" (靖南王 Jingnan wang).

Given sole command of a campaign to attack Guangdong, Geng had reached Jiangxi when he heard that he was being accused of protecting a subordinate who had harbored runaway slaves. He found three hundred slaves in his camp, sent them back to the capital in chains, and, without waiting for a verdict, committed suicide in Ji'an, Jiangxi, on December 30, 1649. His troops, now led by his son Geng Jimao (d. 1671), continued to fight the Southern Ming.

The "Dolo efu" (和碩額駙) rank was given to husbands of Qing princesses. Geng Zhongming, a Han bannerman, was awarded the title of Prince Jingnan, and his son Geng Jingmao managed to have both his sons Geng Jingzhong and Geng Zhaozhong (耿昭忠) become court attendants under the Shunzhi Emperor and marry Aisin Gioro women, with Prince Abatai's granddaughter marrying Geng Zhaozhong and Haoge's (a son of Hong Taiji) daughter marrying Geng Jingzhong. A daughter Princess Roujia (和硕柔嘉公主) of the Manchu Aisin Gioro Prince Yolo (岳樂, Prince An) was wedded to Geng Juzhong who was another son of Geng Jingmao.

Royal titles
Preceded by none	Prince of Jingnan; 1649	Succeeded by Geng Jimao
