= Fu Prefecture (Liaoning) =

Historical administrative division in Liaoning, China

Fuzhou or Fu Prefecture (復州) was a zhou (prefecture) in imperial China, centering on modern Wafangdian, Liaoning, China. It existed (intermittently) from early 11th century until 1913. During the Qing dynasty between 1726 and 1733 it was known as Fuzhou Subprefecture (復州廳).
