= Wu Shifan =

Emperor of the Wu Zhou dynasty
- Reign: 1678–1681
- Predecessor: Wu Sangui
- Born: 1663
- Died: 7 December 1681 (Aged 18-19); Kunming, Yunnan, Qing dynasty
- Consorts: Empress Guo
Names
- Wu Shifan (吳世璠)
Era name and dates
- Honghua (洪化): 1679–1681
- House: Wu
- Dynasty: Wu Zhou
- Father: Wu Yingxiong
- Mother: Princess Kechun

Wu Shifan (Chinese: 吳世璠); 1663–1681, was the grandson of Wu Sangui and his successor as emperor of the Zhou dynasty during the Revolt of the Three Feudatories. He was declared the taisun (太孫, lit. 'Imperial Eldest Grandson'). He was eventually surrounded and killed by Qing forces at the last Zhou stronghold at Kunming.
