= Jurubaça =

Jurubaça was a term for interpreter in the Portuguese colonies of Southeast Asia and the Far East, particularly in Macau. The term is prevalent in mid-sixteenth- through eighteenth-century documents. According to the Grande Dicionário da Língua Portuguesa, a Jurubaça was an “Antigo intérprete da Malásia e do Extremo Oriente,” an ancient interpreter in Malaysia and the Far East. The word derives from Malay jurubassa (juru bahasa), which translates as a person who is an interpreter. The earliest document utilizing the word iurubaças dates from the sixteenth century.
