= Wu Xiang (Ming general) =

Ming Dynasty general (died 1644)

Wu Xiang (Chinese: 吳襄; pinyin: Wú Xiāng; died 1644) was a general of the Ming dynasty and the father of Wu Sangui.

== Biography ==
He was reprimanded by the Ming court in the 1630s for failing to join the fight against Nurhaci. The ruling forces of the short-lived Shun dynasty of late Imperial China took over his house, and Li Zicheng executed him. This contributed to the Wu Sangui's decision to oppose that regime, which hastened the downfall of the already crumbling Ming dynasty.

== See also ==
- Zu Dashou
