= Zu Dashou =

Chinese military general (1580 – 1656)

- 祖大壽
- Born: 2 January 1580; Xingcheng, Liaoning, Ming China
- Died: 8 May 1656 (aged 76); Beijing, Qing China
- Other name: Fuyu (復宇)
- Occupation: General
- Children: Zu Zerun (祖澤潤); Zu Zefu (祖澤溥); Zu Zehong (祖澤洪)
- Parent: Zu Chengxun (祖承訓)
- Relatives: Zu Dabi (祖大弼) (younger brother); Zu Dacheng (祖大成) (younger brother); Zu Dale (祖大樂) (younger cousin); Wu Sangui (吳三桂) (nephew, a son of his sister)

Zu Dashou (Chinese: 祖大壽; 2 January 1580 – 8 May 1656), courtesy name Fuyu (復宇), was a Chinese military general who served on the northern border of the Ming dynasty during the Ming–Qing transition period of Chinese history. He fought against the Qing dynasty in several major engagements before ultimately surrendering to them in 1642. An alleged descendant of the Eastern Jin dynasty general Zu Ti, he was a son of Zu Chengxun, who had been dispatched to Korea as one of the Ming commanders during the Imjin War (1592-1598). And he was the maternal uncle of the Ming general Wu Sangui, who surrendered Shanhai Pass to Qing forces and defected to the Qing side. Zu's tomb was acquired by the Royal Ontario Museum in Toronto, Canada, and is considered one of the "iconic objects" of the museum.

== Background ==
Zu Dashou was born in Ningyuan, present-day Xingcheng, Liaoning province, during the Ming dynasty. His year of birth is unknown. His courtesy name was Fuyu (復宇).

== Defense of Beijing ==
In November 1629, the Qing army under Hong Taiji invaded the Ming dynasty, bypassing the heavily defended Ming fortress at Ningyuan north of the Great Wall, where Hong Taiji's father Nurhaci had been defeated three years earlier at the Battle of Ningyuan. Slipping through friendly Mongol territory, the Manchus attacked to the west through Xifengkou Pass in Hebei province, aiming towards the capital at Beijing. Yuan Chonghuan, commander of the Ningyuan garrison, sent 20,000 troops under Zu Dashou to relieve Beijing. Zu crossed the Great Wall through Shanhai Pass and marched to Beijing, defeating the Manchus outside the city walls.

== Recapturing Luanzhou ==
Although forced to retreat, Hong Taiji's forces had nevertheless captured the cities of Luanzhou, Qian'an, Zunhua, and Yongping (present-day Lulong County) during his 1629 expedition. In 1630, he left his cousin Amin in Yongping to defend the newly conquered territory. Zu Dashou embarked on a counterattack and recovered Luanzhou. In response, Amin ordered a massacre of the civilian populations of Qian'an and Yongping, plundering the cities and abandoning them to the Ming. News of the slaughter enraged Hong Taiji, who had been cultivating relations with the Han Chinese population to pacify captured cities and encourage defection by Ming officers. He had Amin arrested and imprisoned, using the opportunity to appropriate Amin's Bordered Blue Banner army by giving it to Amin's younger brother Jirgalang, who was close to Hong Taiji.

== Siege of Dalinghe ==
In 1631, Zu Dashou was serving as commander of the Jinzhou garrison. He was leading his troops on an inspection of Dalinghe (present-day Linghai city) when Hong Taiji, commanding a force of 20,000 Manchu, Mongol, and Han Chinese troops, arrived to attack the city on September 1. At Dalinghe, Zu commanded an army of 14,000 men, half infantry and half cavalry, many of whom were veterans of his previous battles with Manchu forces. The presence of Zu's men was made known to Hong Taiji when his patrols captured a Ming resident outside the city. Instead of attacking the city directly, the Manchu forces prepared for a long siege, building a moat around the city, and guarding the roads with newly formed artillery units armed with Portuguese cannons under the command of the Chinese general Tong Yangxing.

The Manchu forces focused their efforts on capturing the castles surrounding Dalinghe, sending messengers to each inviting their surrender. They also sent repeated appeals to Zu himself requesting his submission. Meanwhile, several Ming relief forces were defeated by the Manchus outside the city. In October, a larger Ming army of 40,000 men arrived near Jinzhou under the command of Zu's brother-in-law, Wu Xiang. Hong Taiji mobilized his troops and engaged in a field battle with the Ming forces, emerging victorious. On October 13, Hong Taiji wrote Zu Dashou again to solicit his surrender, but received no response. On the 14th, Hong Taiji lured Zu's men to sally forth in an attempt to recapture one of the forts outside the city. The failure of Zu's attack led him to withdraw behind the walls, never attacking again for the duration of the siege. On October 19, another Ming army arrived under the command of Zhang Chun. Making use of Tong Yangxing's gunners, Hong Taiji broke the Ming lines. The Manchus defeated Zhang's army, taking heavy casualties in the process. Zhang Chun was captured and defected to the Manchu side.

== First surrender ==
On November 5, Yuzizhang (于子章), the largest of the forts surrounding Dalinghe, surrendered after being pounded for several days by the "red barbarian" Portuguese cannons of Tong Yangxing. The remaining forts soon surrendered one by one. By mid-November, supplies were low in the Manchu camp, but the situation was far worse inside the walls of Dalinghe, where the population had resorted to cannibalism. Messages were exchanged between the two armies regarding the possibility of surrender. Zu Dashou's adopted son Zu Kefa was sent to the Manchu camp. When asked why the Ming continued to pointlessly defend a now-empty city, Zu Kefa responded that the officers all remembered what had happened at Yongping, where Amin had slaughtered the population the previous year.

After more messages were exchanged, Zu stated his willingness to surrender on the condition that the khan immediately send a force to attack Jinzhou, where Zu's family and those of many of his officers lived. This would enable the soldiers to be reunited with their kin. Knowing that his army was in no condition to mount another major attack, Hong Taiji agreed to a plan in which Zu himself would return to Jinzhou, of which he was still the commanding officer, under the pretense of having escaped from Dalinghe. After entering the city, he would turn it over to the khan. With the plan decided, Zu's forces finally surrendered Dalinghe on November 21.

== Escape to Jinzhou ==
Shortly after surrendering to Hong Taiji, Zu was dispatched to Jinzhou along with 26 retainers to execute his plan to capture the city. On November 26, he sent a letter from Jinzhou explaining that he needed more time to plan the coup. Hong Taiji's reply to this letter went unanswered. Despite leaving his sons and nephews in the care of the khan, Zu Dashou had returned to the Ming to once again command the Jinzhou garrison. In the following years, his sons would become important officers of the Manchu Qing military. Zu Zerun joined the Plain Yellow Banner as a general, while Zu Kefa become a leading architect of the conquest of the Ming.

== Second surrender ==
In 1636, Hong Taiji declared himself Emperor Taizong of the Qing dynasty. After subjugating Korea and Inner Mongolia, he turned his sights upon Jinzhou once again. The Qing attacked Jinzhou in 1639 and again in 1640. Both times they were defeated by Zu Dashou. In 1641, Taizong sent an army to besiege Jinzhou and Songshan. The commander of Songshan was Hong Chengchou, commander-in-chief of frontier defenses. Songshan was captured on March 18, 1642, along with several brothers of Zu Dashou: Zu Dale, Zu Daming, and Zu Dacheng. Zu Dale was Zu Dashou's younger brother, and, along with Dashou's sons, were sent to speak with Zu Dashou during the siege of Jinzhou to convince him to surrender, which he did on April 8, 1642, after a long siege in which, just as at Dalinghe previously, his troops had resorted to cannibalism. Hong Taiji, now Emperor Taizong, chided Zu for his treachery after his first surrender at Dalinghe. Nevertheless, Zu was forgiven and permitted to serve the Qing alongside the other members of his clan, many of whom had already served with distinction.

== Service under the Qing ==
After surrendering to the Qing, Zu wrote several letters to the commander of Ningyuan, his nephew Wu Sangui, to solicit his defection to the Qing. When the rebels of Li Zicheng captured Beijing in 1644, prompting the suicide of Zhu Youjian (the Chongzhen Emperor), Wu allied with the Qing dynasty. He opened the gates of Shanhai Pass to the Qing army under Dorgon in order to mount a joint campaign to oust the rebels from the capital. With this act, the Qing captured Beijing. Although the war between Ming and Qing would last several decades longer, the Ming would never recover from this loss, and the Qing would ultimately destroy the Ming.

Zu Dashou died in Beijing in 1656. He was buried with full honors as a member of the Plain Yellow Banner.

== Tomb ==
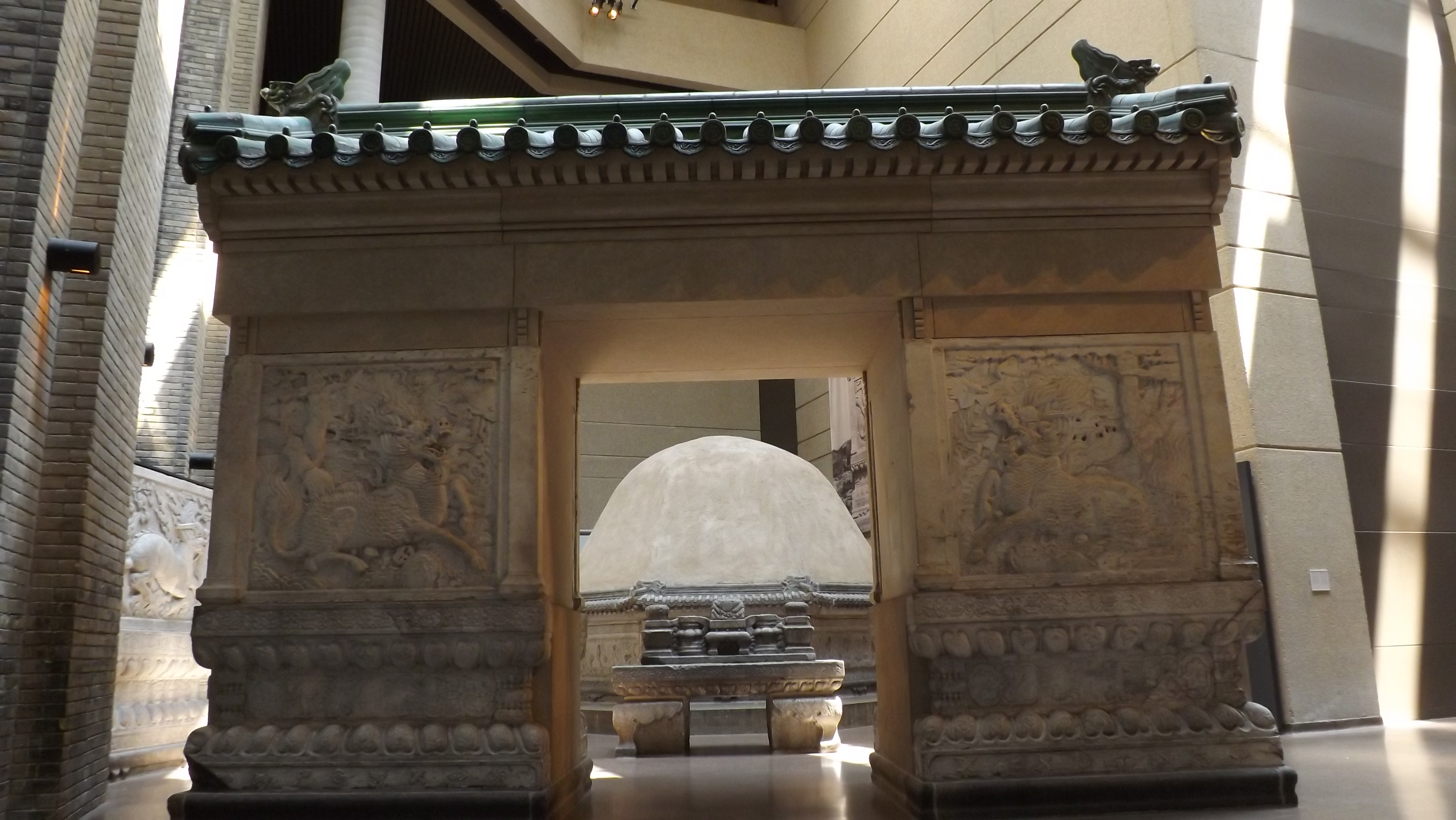
Archway and burial mound, Tomb of Zu Dashou

In 1921, Charles Trick Currelly, the archaeological director of the Royal Ontario Museum in Toronto, Canada, purchased a set of Chinese artifacts from the fur trader George Crofts. Among the artifacts, the most spectacular was the so-called "Ming Tomb", which came from a village north of Beijing. It was rumoured to be the tomb of Zu Dashou, but the rumour was not confirmed until 90 years later, when researchers concluded that the tomb belonged to Zu Dashou and his three wives. The tomb is on the museum's list of "iconic objects".

In 2013, 25 fragments of Zu Dashou's tombstone were found in his hometown Xingcheng. The largest fragment weighs more than 200 kilograms (440 lb). Altogether the fragments comprise the upper half of his tombstone, inscribed with 81 Chinese characters. The tombstone was originally at least 3 metres (9.8 ft) tall. His descendants still live in the area.

== Bibliography ==
- Wakeman, Frederic (1985), The Great Enterprise: The Manchu Reconstruction of Imperial Order in Seventeenth-century China, Berkeley: University of California Press, ISBN 0520048040
- Derksen, Tessa (2009). Iconic: The Must-See Treasures of the ROM. Royal Ontario Museum. ISBN 978-0-88854-473-5.
- Hummel, Arthur W. Sr., ed. (1943). "Tsu Ta-shou" . Eminent Chinese of the Ch'ing Period. United States Government Printing Office.
