= Sun Chengzong =

Chinese general

- 孫承宗
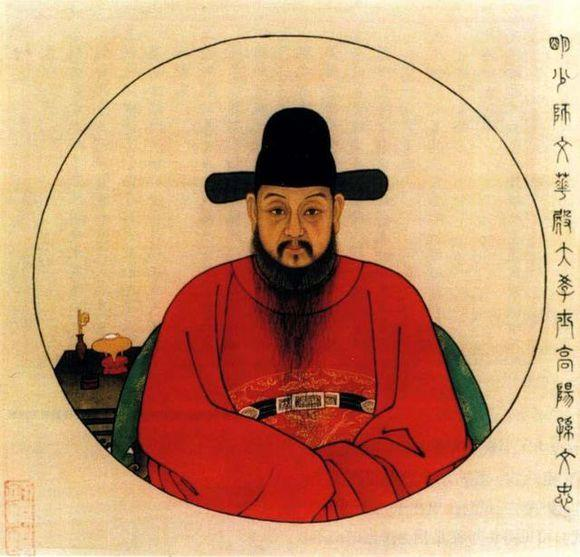
- Portrait of Sun Chengzong
- Born: 1563; Gaoyang County, Hebei
- Died: 1638 (aged 74–75); North Zhili, Hebei
- Occupations: Politician, imperial tutor, general

Sun Chengzong (Chinese: 孫承宗; 1563–1638) was a Grand Secretary of the late Ming dynasty. He was also made Minister of War in 1629. Sun favoured a forward defence strategy in the northeast frontier. He was one of the most important figures in the war against the Manchus, with one of his pupils Qian Qianyi noting that "the famous generals of the past 20 years were all pupils of Sun Chengzong". He also succeeded in revitalizing the troops of Liaodong after taking his post in 1622, recapturing 400 li of territory from the Manchu ruler Nurhaci during his four years in command in Liaodong.
