= Wu Sangui =

Chinese general and rebel (1612–1678)

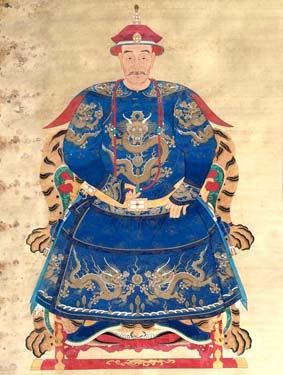

Emperor of the Wu Zhou dynasty
- Reign: March 1678 – 2 October 1678
- Successor: Wu Shifan
- Born: 8 June 1612; Suizhong, Liaoxi, Ming dynasty
- Died: 2 October 1678 (aged 66); Hengyang, Hunan, Qing dynasty
- Consorts: Empress Zhang; Chen Yuanyuan
Names
- Wu Sangui (吳三桂)
Era name and dates
- Zhaowu (昭武): 1678
Posthumous name
- Emperor Kaitian Dadao Tongren Jiyun Tongwen Shenwu Gao (開天達道同仁極運通文神武高皇帝; Roughly meaning: Master of Heaven and Dao, Humane, Extremely Fortunate, Acquainted with the Classics, Divine General, High Emperor)
Temple name
- Taizu (太祖)
- House: Wu
- Dynasty: Wu Zhou
- Father: Wu Xiang
- Mother: Lady Zu

Wu Sangui
- Traditional Chinese: 吳三桂
- Simplified Chinese: 吴三桂
Transcriptions
Standard Mandarin
- Hanyu Pinyin: Wú Sānguì
- Wade–Giles: Wu^{2} San^{1}-kuei^{4}
- IPA: [ǔ sán.kwêɪ]
Yue: Cantonese
- Yale Romanization: Ngh Sāamgwai
- Jyutping: Ng4 Saam1gwai3
- IPA: [ŋ sam˥.kʷɐj˧]

Wu Sangui (Chinese: 吳三桂; pinyin: Wú Sānguì; Wade–Giles: Wu San-kuei; 8 June 1612 – 2 October 1678), courtesy name Changbai (長白) or Changbo (長伯), was a Chinese military leader who played a key role in the fall of the Ming dynasty and the founding of the Qing dynasty. In Chinese folklore, Wu Sangui is regarded as a disreputable Han Chinese traitor for his defection over to the Manchu invaders, suppression of the Southern Ming resistance and execution of the Yongli Emperor. Wu eventually double-crossed both of his masters, the Ming and the Qing dynasties.

In 1644, Wu was a Ming general in charge of garrisoning Shanhai Pass, the strategic choke point between Manchuria and Beijing. After learning that Li Zicheng's rebel army had conquered Beijing and captured his family, including his father Wu Xiang and concubine Chen Yuanyuan, Wu allowed the Manchu to enter China proper through Shanhai Pass to drive Li from Beijing, where the Manchu then set up the Qing dynasty. For his aid, the Qing rulers awarded him a fiefdom consisting of Yunnan and Guizhou provinces, along with the title "Prince Who Pacifies the West" (平西王).

In 1674, Wu decided to rebel against the Qing. In 1678, Wu declared himself the new Emperor of China and the ruler of Zhou, only to die within months. For a time, his grandson Wu Shifan succeeded him. The revolt was quelled in 1681.

== Early years ==
Wu was born in Suizhong, Liaoxi province, in Northeastern China, to Wu Xiang and Lady Zu. His ancestral home was Gaoyou, Jiangsu. Wu Sangui's father and uncle had fought in many battles. Under their influence, Wu took great interest in war and politics at an early age. He was also a student of artist Dong Qichang. Late Ming dynasty historians left behind records describing Wu Sangui as a valiant and handsome general of medium height, with pale skin, a straight nose, and big ears, with a scar on his nose. He possessed excellent skills in horse-riding and archery.

In 1627, the Chongzhen Emperor decided to reinstate the imperial examination system on his accession to the throne, and Wu became a first-degree military scholar (juren) at the age of fifteen. He and his two brothers joined the army, garrisoning the Daling River and Ningyuan in the army of general Zu Dashou.

In 1630, while gathering information about the enemy, Wu's father, Wu Xiang, was encircled by the Qing troops. Wu Sangui was denied help from his maternal uncle, Zu Dashou, and so decided to rescue his father with a force of about 20 soldiers chosen from his personal retinue. Wu Sangui and his small cavalry force charged into the enemy encirclement, killing the Manchu general and saved Wu Xiang. Both Hong Taiji and Zu were impressed by Wu's valour, and Zu recommended Wu's promotion. Wu Sangui gained the position of guerrilla general when he was no older than 20.

== Service under the Ming dynasty ==
=== Garrisoning Liaodong ===
In 1632, the Ming court transferred the Liaodong army to Shandong, to defeat the rebel armies of Kong Youde. Wu, who was 22 years old, served as a guerrilla general and fought side by side with his father, Wu Xiang. Wu rose to the rank of deputy general and was promoted to full general in September of that year. In September 1638, Wu served as a deputy general again.

At the beginning of 1639, as the situation in Liaodong became increasingly tense, the Ming court transferred general Hong Chengchou as the governor-general (Chinese: 总督; pinyin: Zǒngdū) of Jiliao; Hong appointed Wu as the general in charge of training.

In October 1639, a Qing army of more than 10,000 men, commanded by Duoduo and Haoge, invaded Ningyuan. Jin Guofeng, full general of Ningyuan, immediately led troops to confront the Qing army but was surrounded and killed. Wu took Jin's place as full general of Ningyuan, and became a guardian general of Liaodong.

After Wu served as the full general in Ningyuan, he made the local army the strongest in Liaodong, having 20,000 troops at Ningyuan town. To enhance their combat power, Wu selected 1,000 elite soldiers to form a fearless battalion. The battalion was trained and commanded by Wu himself, making these men his bodyguard who would come at Wu's call at any time. They were the core of his army and laid the foundation for Wu's military achievements.

In March 1640, Hong Taiji appointed Jirgalang and Duoduo as left and right commander, respectively, marching towards the north of Jinzhou. Aiming to besiege Jinzhou, they reestablished Yizhou, garrisoned the troops, opened up wasteland, grew food grain, and forbade any cultivation in the Ningjin area outside Shanhai Pass.

=== Battle of Xingshan ===
On 18 May 1640, Wu Sangui met the Qing army in battle at Xingshan. Jirgalang led 1,500 soldiers to accept the surrender of the Mongolian people, but they were spotted by general Liu Zhaoji when passing the Ming army. Liu Zhaoji led 3,000 soldiers against the Qing army. At that time, Wu Sangui was stationed in Songshan and brought a 3,000-strong force the moment he heard the news. From Jinzhou, Zu Dashou sent more than 700 soldiers as a reserve. At first, the Ming army seemed more powerful with superior numbers; but, after the pursuit of Jiamashan, the Qing army was able to surround Wu Sangui.

Wu Sangui was unable to withstand the repeated attacks from both Jirgalang and Duoduo. He fought a bloody battle with the Qing army, but could not break through the siege until Liu Zhaoji came to his rescue. The Ming army casualties were more than 1000, with deputy general Yanglun and Zhou Yanzhou dead, but Wu Sangui's bravery was still praised.

=== Battle of Songjin ===
On 25 April 1641, the battle of Songjin began with an attack by the Ming army, Wu Sangui leading and personally killing ten enemies, defeating the Qing cavalry. After the battle, Wu Sangui was regarded as its most outstanding general.

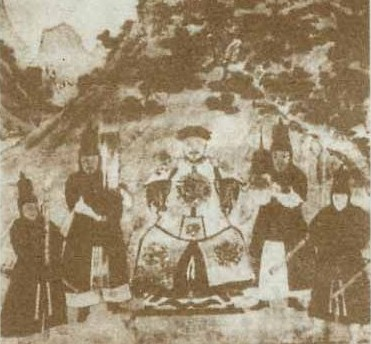
Wu Sangui (center)

In June 1641, Hong Chengchou and Wu Sangui returned to Songshan and garrisoned the northwest area. Prince Zheng Jirgalang attacked several times towards Songshan and Xinshan but was defeated repeatedly, the Ming army succeeding in surrounding the Qing army four times. Though the Qing army finally broke through the encirclement, their casualties were very high. Due to Wu Sangui's bravery, the Ming army remained on the offensive, but it also paid a heavy price.

On 20 August 1641, the Ming army attacked the Qing camp. The battle lasted the whole day, and the result was too close to call. However, Prince Ajige unexpectedly captured the Ming army's provisions in Bijia Mountain, significantly undermining their ability to fight. The battle continued on 21 August, and was unfavourable to the Ming army. After this defeat Datong full general Wang Pu lost the will to fight. Before Hong Chengchou issued orders, Wang fled with his troops, which completely disrupted the original breakthrough plan. More surprisingly, Wu Sangui also fled in the chaos, escaping on Wang's heel. At such a life-or-death moment, Wu revealed selfishness.

The Ming army attempted to withdraw, pursued by the Qing. In a matter of a few days, more than 53,000 people and 7,400 horses of the Ming army were killed. They had no way to flee and no will to fight. Only 30,000 survived after fleeing back to Ningyuan.

Wu Sangui survived not only by following Wang Pu, but by having a good retreat plan. When Hong Chengchou ordered the breakthrough, Wu Sangui went back to his camp and immediately discussed tactics with his generals. They decided to give up the small path and flee on the main road. As expected, the Qing army had only cut off the small path, while no more than 400 soldiers held the main road under Hong Taiji. Seeing Wu Sangui's fierce charge, Hong Taiji restrained his army from pursuing. Hong thought highly of Wu, and considered gaining his favor as the key to conquering the dynasty.

The breakthrough at Songshan resulted in the deaths of 52,000 members of the Ming elite army, which greatly wounded the Ming dynasty. Wu and Wang Pu could not escape the fate of being punished for fleeing and avoiding combat and were sentenced to death.

=== Promotion after the defeat ===
A few days later, Wu, who had fled to Ningyuan, received the imperial decree of the Chongzhen emperor. Surprisingly, Wu was promoted above all the full generals. This implied that Wu would not be punished, which was beyond the comprehension of many government officials. Even more surprising was that, months later, when someone in the court called for an investigation to determine responsibility for the Songshan defeat, only Wang Pu was arrested while Wu continued to serve as a governor general of Liaodong, garrisoned in Ningyuan. This caused an outcry in the Ming court.

In May 1642, the result of the Ming court's re-examination was the death penalty for Wang Pu, and demotion of three levels in rank for Wu. Wu continued to serve as full general in Ningyuan and was in charge of the training of the Liaodong army.

== Defection to the Qing ==
=== Surrender to the Qing dynasty ===
By February 1642, the Ming dynasty had lost four of the eight vital cities beyond Shanhai Pass to the Manchu army. Ningyuan, where Wu was stationed, became Beijing's last defence against the Manchu army. Hong Taiji repeatedly attempted to persuade Wu to surrender, to no avail. Wu did not side with the Qing dynasty until after the defensive capability of the Ming dynasty had been greatly weakened with its political apparatus destroyed by the rebel armies of Li Zicheng's Shun dynasty.

In early 1644, Li Zicheng, the head of a peasant rebel army, launched his force from Xi'an for his final offensive northeast toward Beijing. The Chongzhen Emperor decided to abandon Ningyuan and called upon Wu to defend Beijing against the rebels. Wu Sangui received the title Pingxi Bo (Chinese: 平西伯; pinyin: Píng xībó; lit. 'Count who pacifies the West') as he moved to face the peasant army.

At the time of Beijing's fall to Li Zicheng, on 25 April 1644, Wu and his 40,000-man army—the most significant Ming fighting force in northern China—were on the way to Beijing to come to the Chongzhen Emperor's aid but then received word of the emperor's suicide. So they garrisoned Shanhai Pass, the eastern terminus of the main Great Wall instead. Wu and his men were then caught between the rebels within the Great Wall and the Manchus without.

After the collapse of the Ming dynasty, Wu and his army became a vital military force in deciding the fate of China. Both Dorgon and Li Zicheng tried to gain Wu's support. Li took a number of measures to secure Wu's surrender, granting silver, gold, a dukedom, and most crucially by capturing Wu's father, Wu Xiang, and concubine, Chen Yuanyuan, ordering the former to write a letter to persuade Wu to pledge allegiance to Li.

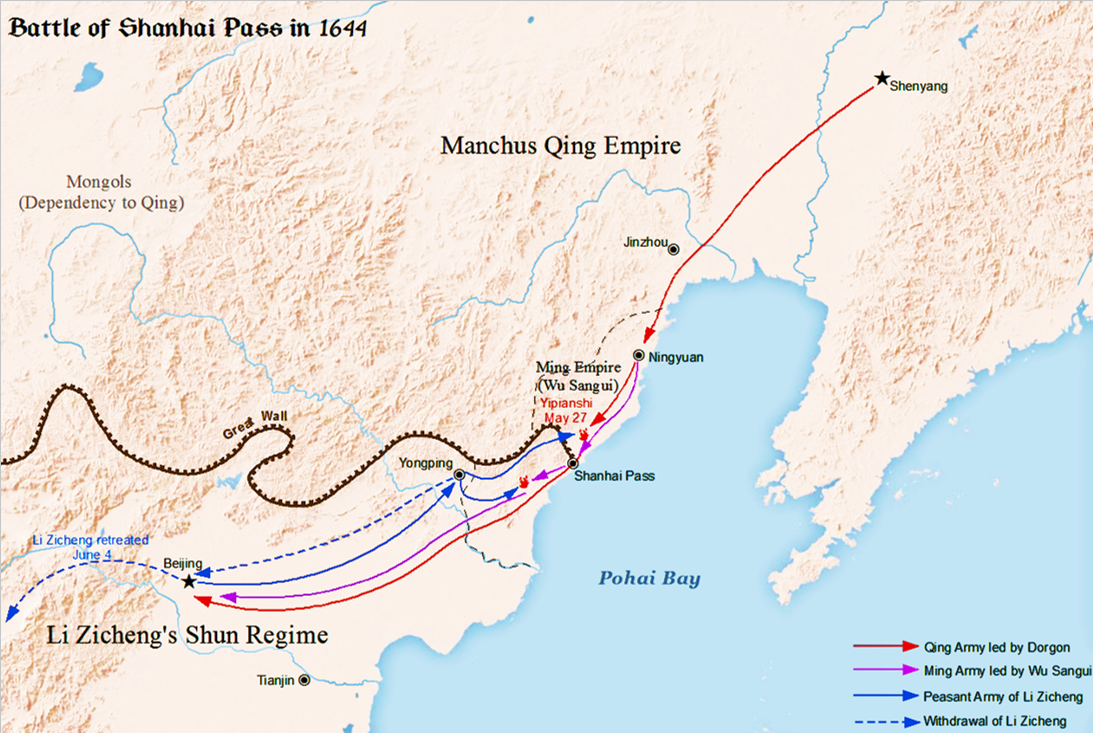
Battle of Shanhai Pass in which Wu Sangui surrendered to Qing dynasty

Wu, however, was enraged by Li's capture of his family and the looting of Beijing. He killed Li's envoy, wrote back to his father, scolding him for his disloyalty, and sent several generals to pretend to pledge allegiance to Li. Aware that his force alone was insufficient to fight Li's main army, Wu wrote to the Manchu prince-regent Dorgon for military support, under the condition of restricting the dominance of the Manchus to northern China and the Ming to south. Dorgon replied that the Manchus would help Wu, but Wu would have to submit to the Qing. Wu did not accept at first.

Li Zicheng sent two armies to attack the pass, but Wu's battle-hardened troops defeated them easily on 5 and 10 May 1644. In order to secure his position, Li was determined to destroy Wu's army. On 18 May, he personally led 60,000 troops out of Beijing to attack Wu and defeated Wu on 21 May. The next day, Wu wrote to Dorgon for help. Dorgon took the opportunity to force Wu to surrender, and Wu had little choice but to accept.

On 22 May 1644, Wu opened the gates of the Great Wall of China at Shanhai Pass to let the Qing forces into China proper, forming an alliance with the Manchus. Wu ordered his soldiers to wear white cloths attached to their armour, to distinguish them from Li's forces. Together, Wu's army and the Qing forces defeated Li's main army in the Battle of Shanhai Pass on 27 May 1644. Li retreated to Beijing and took revenge on Wu by executing thirty-eight members of the Wu household, including Wu's father, whose head was displayed on the city wall.

On 3 June, Li held his coronation ceremony in Beijing and fled the next day. The Manchus marched into the Chinese capital unopposed shortly afterward and enthroned the young Shunzhi Emperor in the Forbidden City.

=== Suppressing the rebellion in Shaanxi ===
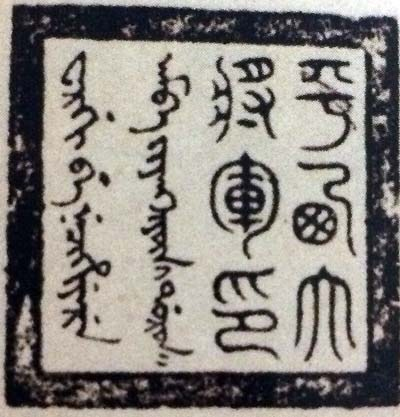
Qing seal for Wu as General Who Pacifies the West

Wu Sangui pledged allegiance to the Qing dynasty and received the title of Pingxi Wang (Chinese: 平西王; pinyin: Píngxī wáng; lit. 'Prince who pacifies the West'). However, he remained fearful that the Qing dynasty held him in suspicion.

In October 1644, Wu received orders to suppress the rebel peasant army. At that time, Li Zicheng still held Shaanxi, Hubei, Henan, among others, and was gathering his troops to rise again. Wu, together with Shang Kexi, led his soldiers to Shaanxi under Ajige, the General of Jingyuan appointed by Dorgon. From October to the following August, when he returned to Beijing, Wu fought the peasant army and achieved great success.

In June 1645, Wu Sangui captured Yulin and Yan'an in Shaanxi province. At the same time Li Zicheng was killed by a village head in Tongshan county, Hubei province.

In 1645, the Qing court rewarded Wu Sangui with the title of Qin Wang (Chinese: 亲王; pinyin: Qīnwáng; lit. 'Prince of the Blood') and ordered him to garrison Jinzhou. The high-sounding title was belied by transferring Wu to Jinzhou, which had lost its position as a militarily important town and become an insignificant rear area. Moreover, along with a large number of Manchu and Han people migrating into central China, it had become sparsely populated and desolate. Hence, Wu felt perplexed and upset.

On 19 August 1645, before Wu returned to Liaodong from Beijing, he submitted his request to the Qing court to renounce his title as Qin Wang. After giving up his title, he began to make efforts to consolidate his strength by demanding troops, territory, compensation, and reward for the generals under his command, which were all granted by the imperial court.

In July 1646, when Wu was summoned by the emperor, the Qing court granted him a total of 10 horses and 20,000 pieces of silver as an extra reward. Wu wasn't pleased, however, since he had been set aside since his return to Jinzhou, while the army of Kong Youde, Geng Jingzhong, and Shang Kexi had been fighting against the Southern Ming regime in Hunan and Guangxi since 1646.

=== Suppressing the rebellion in Sichuan ===
In 1648, the rebellion against the Qing dynasty reached its climax. Jiang Xiang, the full general of Datong, waged an insurgency in Shanxi province, while, in the south, in Nanchang and Guangzhou, Jin Shenghuan and Li Chenghong also rebelled, which dramatically changed the military situation.

The rebellion from the surrendered Han generals greatly shocked the Qing dynasty rulers. They came to realize the significant role of these generals to the control of central China, as well as the importance of the strategy of "using Han to rule Han" (以漢制漢). In this situation, Wu thrived again.

At the beginning of 1648, the Qing court ordered Wu to move his family west and garrison Hanzhong with Chief General (Du Tong) of the Eight Banners Moergen and Li Weihan. In less than a year, Wu suppressed the rebellion in most regions of Shaanxi and reversed the situation in the northwest. After four years of struggle, Wu brought peace to Shaanxi and his political star rose in the Qing court.

In 1652, the rebel Daxi army became the main force rebelling against the Qing. The situation was made difficult by the deaths of the Qing generals Kong Youde and Ni Kan, when the rebels Li Dingguo and Liu Wenxiu's troops marched into Sichuan province. The Qing court then summoned Wu to suppress the Daxi army in Sichuan. However, Wu was being closely watched by general Li Guohan, a trusted advisor to the imperial court. Wu wasn't able to free himself from surveillance until a few years later, when Li died. Hence, Wu enhanced his military strength rapidly by gaining a large number of enemy surrenders.

=== Garrisoning Yunnan ===
In 1660, the Qing army split into three parts to march into Yunnan province and eliminated the Southern Ming regime, thus achieving the preliminary unification of China. Nevertheless, the imperial court still faced a number of serious military and political threats. The Yongli Emperor of the Southern Ming and Li Dingguo of the Daxi army retreated to Burma, and they maintained influence in Yunnan. It was inconvenient for the Eight Banners soldiers to garrison Yunnan's border area, which was far away from the capital. As a result, the imperial court approved the proposal by Hong Chengchou to withdraw those soldiers, and give Wu command of the border area. Thus, Wu not only commanded a large army but also controlled vast territory.

In 1661, the green-flag army under Wu numbered 60,000, while Shang Kexi and Geng Jimao had only 7,500 ad 7,000 soldiers in their armies. Wu planned to permanently garrison and was preparing to make the border area his own. However, Yunnan was not stable at that time, for newly surrendered soldiers had not been fully assimilated into the Qing force. Moreover, the Daxi army had been building in Yunnan over decades and shared a close relationship with various minority nationalities. Many Tusi leaders refused to accept the rule of Wu, which led to a series of rebellions. The existence of the Yongli Emperor of the Southern Ming dynasty and Li Dingguo's army was regarded as a great threat to Wu. Therefore, Wu was actively preparing for their elimination to consolidate his rule. He exaggerated the rebellion's threat, spread rumors and submitted his proposal to the court, urging the invasion of Burma, which, after a time, the imperial court approved.

In June 1662, Wu sent an army into Burma, captured and killed the Yongli Emperor, while Li Dingguo died of illness. In the next few years, Wu led his army from the northwest to the southwest border and enabled the Qing dynasty's dominance in that part of the country.

== Revolt against the Qing ==
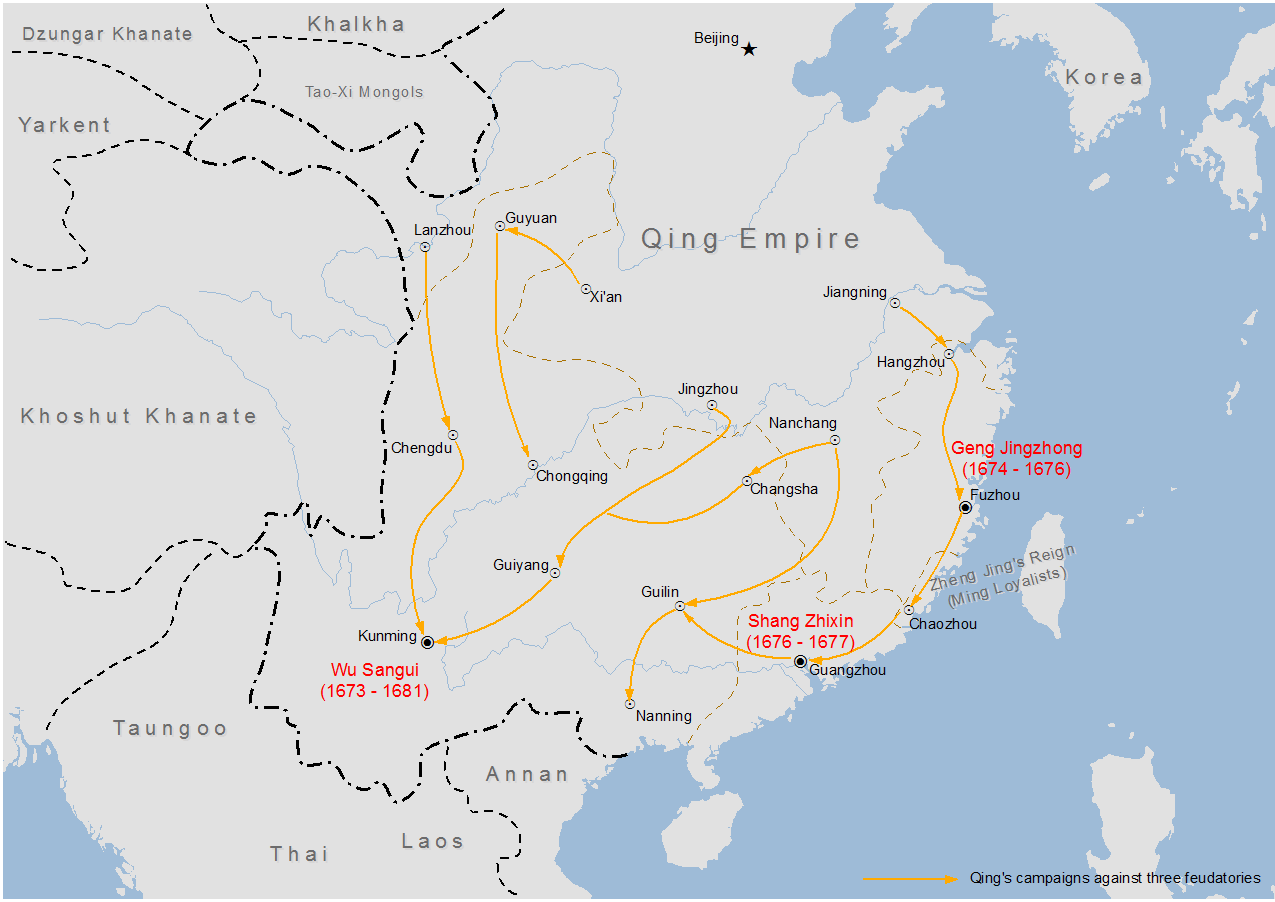
Map showing the Revolt of the Three Feudatories

After he defeated the remnant Ming forces in southwestern China, Wu was rewarded by the Qing imperial court with the title of Pingxi Wang (平西王; translated as "Prince Who Pacifies the West" or "King Who Pacifies the West") with a fief in Yunnan. It had been extremely rare for someone outside of the imperial clan, especially a non-Manchu, to be granted the title of Wang. Those who were not members of the imperial clan and awarded the title were called Yixing Wang (literally meaning "kings with other family names") or known as "vassal kings". These vassal kings usually came to a bad end, mainly because they were not trusted by the emperors.

At the end of 1662, Guizhou province came under the jurisdiction of Wu. Meanwhile, Wu's son, Wu Yingxiong (Wu Shifan's father), married Princess Jianning, the 14th daughter of Hong Taiji and Kangxi's aunt.

The Qing imperial court did not trust Wu, but he was still able to rule Yunnan with little or no interference. This was because the Manchus, an ethnic minority, needed time after their prolonged conquest to figure out how to impose the rule of a dynasty of a tiny minority on the vast Han-Chinese society. As a semi-independent ruler in the distant southwest, Wu was seen as an asset to the Qing court. For much of his rule, he received massive annual subsidies from the central government. This money, as well as the long period of stability, was spent by Wu in building his army, in preparation for an eventual clash with the Qing dynasty.

Wu in Yunnan, along with Shang Kexi in Guangdong and Geng Jingzhong in Fujian—the three great Han military allies of the Manchus, who had pursued the rebels and the Southern Ming pretenders—became a financial burden on the central government. Their virtually autonomous control of large areas threatened the stability of the Qing dynasty. The Kangxi Emperor decided to make Wu and two other princes who had been rewarded with large fiefs in southern and western China move from their lands to resettle in Manchuria. In 1673, Shang Kexi requested permission to retire and return to his homeland in the north, and the Kangxi Emperor granted the request at once. Forced into an awkward situation, Wu and Geng Jingzhong requested the same shortly afterwards. The Kangxi Emperor granted their requests and decided to dissolve the three vassal states, overriding all objections.

Driven by the threat to their interests, the three revolted and thus began the eight-year-long civil war known as the Revolt of the Three Feudatories. Before the rebellion, Wu sent a confidant to Beijing to retrieve Wu Yingxiong, his son and the young emperor's uncle-in-law; but his son disagreed. The confidant only brought back Wu Shipan, Wu Yingxiong's son by a concubine. On 28 December 1673, Wu killed Zhu Guozhi, the governor of Yunnan, and rebelled "against the alien and rebuilding Ming dynasty". On 7 January 1674, 62-year-old Wu led troops from Yunnan on the northern expedition and took the whole territory of Guizhou province without any loss. Wu Yingxiong and his sons with Princess Jianning was executed by the Kangxi Emperor soon after his father's rebellion. Shortly afterwards, Wu founded his own Zhou dynasty. By April 1674, Wu Sangui's army had quickly occupied Hunan, Hubei, Sichuan, and Guangxi. In the next 2 years, Geng Jingzhong, Wang Fuchen, and Shang Zhixin successively rose in rebellion, and Wu's rebellion had expanded into the Revolt of the Three Feudatories. By April 1676, the rebel force possessed 11 provinces (Yunnan, Guizhou, Sichuan, Shaanxi, Gansu, Hunan, Guangdong, Guangxi, Fujian, Zhejiang, and Jiangxi). For a moment, the situation seemed to favor Wu.

Unexpectedly, Wu halted his march and stayed south of Yangzi river for three months because of a shortage of troops and financial resources, which gave the Kangxi emperor a chance to assemble his forces. Wang Fuchen, Geng Jingzhong, and Shang Zhixin surrendered one after another under the attack of Qing forces.

In 1678, Wu Sangui went a step further and declared himself the emperor of the "Great Zhou", with the era name of Zhaowu (昭武). He established his capital at Hengzhou (present-day Hengyang, Hunan). When he died in October 1678, his grandson, Wu Shifan, took over command of his forces and continued the struggle. The remnants of Wu's armies were defeated soon after, in December 1681, and Wu Shifan committed suicide. Wu's son-in-law was sent to Beijing with Wu Shifan's head. The Kangxi Emperor sent parts of Wu's corpse to various provinces of China.

=== Zhou dynasty (1678–1681) ===
Convention: use personal name
| Temple names | Family name and first name | Period of reign | Era name |
| Taizu | Wú Sānguì | March 1678 – 2 October 1678 | Zhāowǔ |
| | Wú Shìfán | 1678–1681 | Hónghuà |

== Family ==
Brothers:

- Wu Sanfeng (吳三鳳)
- Wu Sanfu (吳三輔)
- Wu Sanmei (吳三枚)

Consorts and Issue:

- Empress Zhang (皇后 張氏, 1615 – 1699)
  - Wu Yingxiong, Emperor Xiaogong (孝恭皇帝), first son, husband of Princess Jianning and uncle-in-law of the Kangxi Emperor
- Concubine Chen Yuanyuan (陳圓圓)
- Unknown:
  - 6 daughters
  - Adopted son: Wu Yingqi (吳應麒)

== In culture ==
Wu Sangui has often been regarded as a traitor and an opportunist, due to his betrayals of both the Ming and Qing dynasties. Wu's name is synonymous with betrayal in Chinese culture (similar to the use of "Benedict Arnold" in the United States). Wu's story with his concubine, Chen Yuanyuan, who is sometimes compared to Helen of Troy, remains one of the classic love stories in China.

Wu Sangui and his son, Wu Yingxiong, appear as antagonists in the popular wuxia novel The Deer and the Cauldron by Jin Yong. In CTS drama Princess Huai Yu (2000), Wu appears as an antagonist but Wu Yingxiong features prominently as the best friend of the Kangxi Emperor and love interest of Princess Jianning. Wu and Chen's love story has often been romanticized, as in RTV drama Princess Cheung Ping (1981), ATV drama The Rise and Fall of Qing Dynasty (1987), CTV drama Chen Yuanyuan (1989), and TVB drama Perish in the Name of Love (2003). In CCTV series The Affaire in the Swing Age (2005), which covers his early life and military career, Wu is shown as being forced into making the fateful decisions that have made him infamous. In the CCTV series Kangxi Dynasty (2001), which covers his late career, Wu is depicted in a neutral way as a force in the power play with the Manchu overlords; his son, Wu Yingxiong, who was held in Beijing as an honored hostage and was eventually executed due to Wu Sangui's revolt, is presented as torn between loyalty to the royalty and filial piety to his family.

== See also ==
- Ming–Qing transition
- Royal and noble ranks of the Qing dynasty

== Sources ==
- Wakeman, Frederic (1985), The Great Enterprise: The Manchu Reconstruction of Imperial Order in Seventeenth-Century China, Berkeley, Los Angeles, and London: University of California Press, ISBN 978-0-520-04804-1. In two volumes.
- Hummel, Arthur W. Sr., ed. (1943). "Wu San-kuei" . Eminent Chinese of the Ch'ing Period. United States Government Printing Office.
