= Lianshan District =

Coordinates: 40°45′51″N 120°51′11″E

Lianshan 连山区 Lienshan
- District
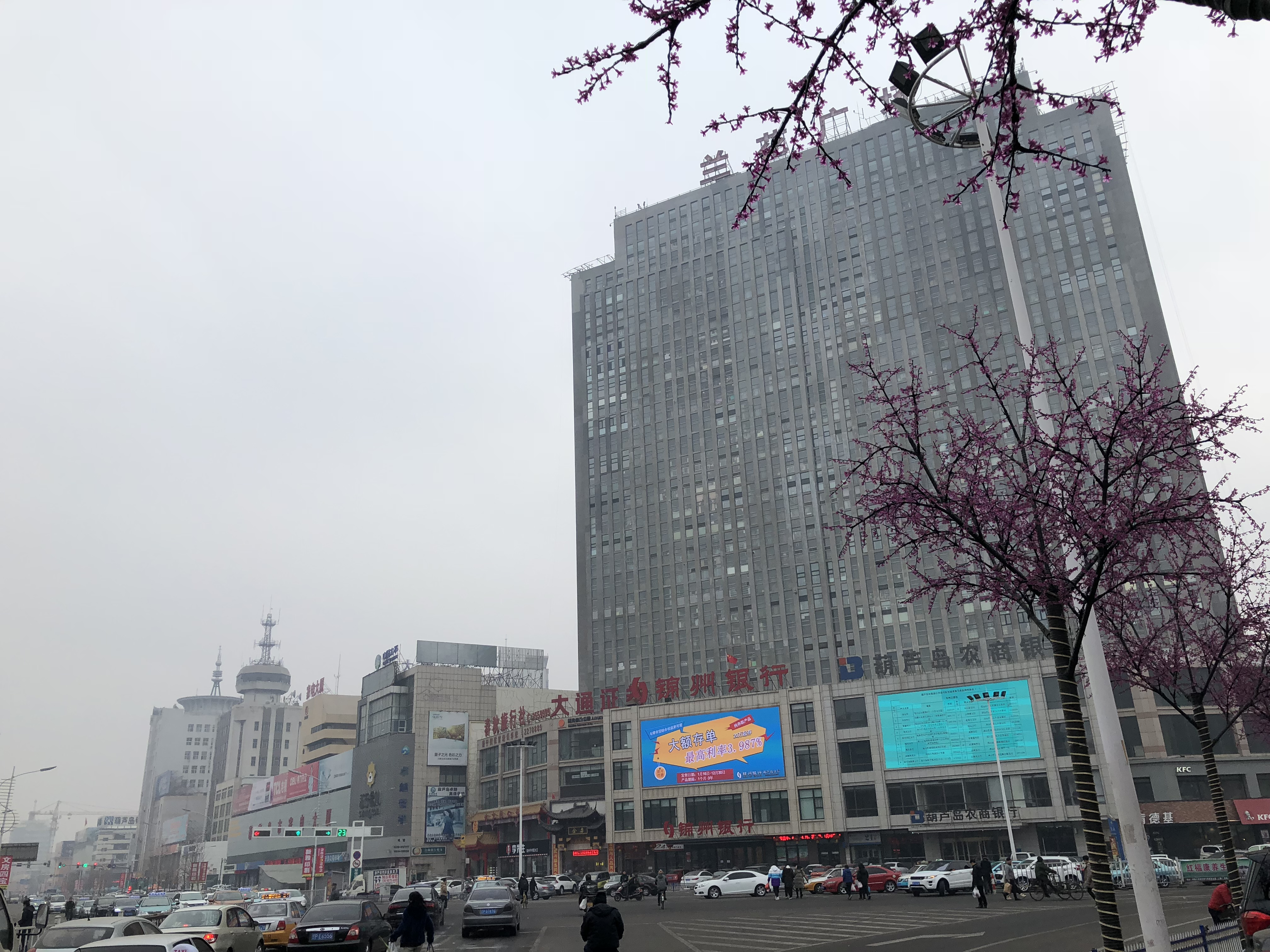

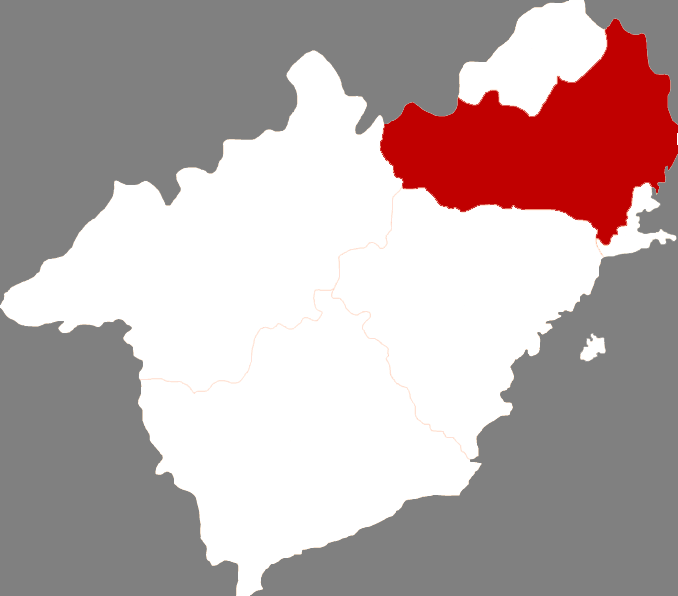
- Location in Huludao

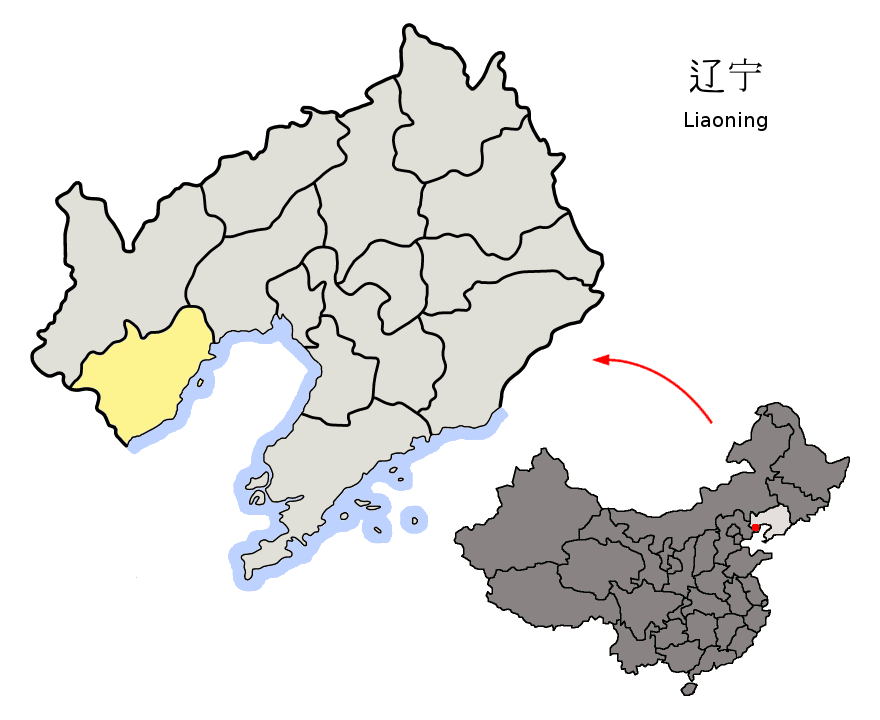
- Huludao in Liaoning
- Country: People's Republic of China
- Province: Liaoning
- Prefecture-level city: Huludao

Area
  - Total: 1,173 km^{2} (453 sq mi)

Population (2020 census)
  - Total: 468,110
  - Density: 399.1/km^{2} (1,034/sq mi)
- Time zone: UTC+8 (China Standard)

Lianshan District (simplified Chinese: 连山区; traditional Chinese: 連山區; pinyin: Liánshān Qū) is a district under the administration of the city of Huludao, Liaoning, People's Republic of China. It is located in the northeastern corner of Huludao prefecture, bordering Jinzhou. It has a total area of 1,651 square kilometres (637 sq mi), and along with Longgang District is one of the two districts within which Huludao city itself is situated.

Lianshan district encompasses the old district of Huludao city, and most of the city's industry along with the two main railway stations are located here. The Lianshan government headquarters is in the very center of Huludao, along Zhongyang Road.

== Administrative divisions ==
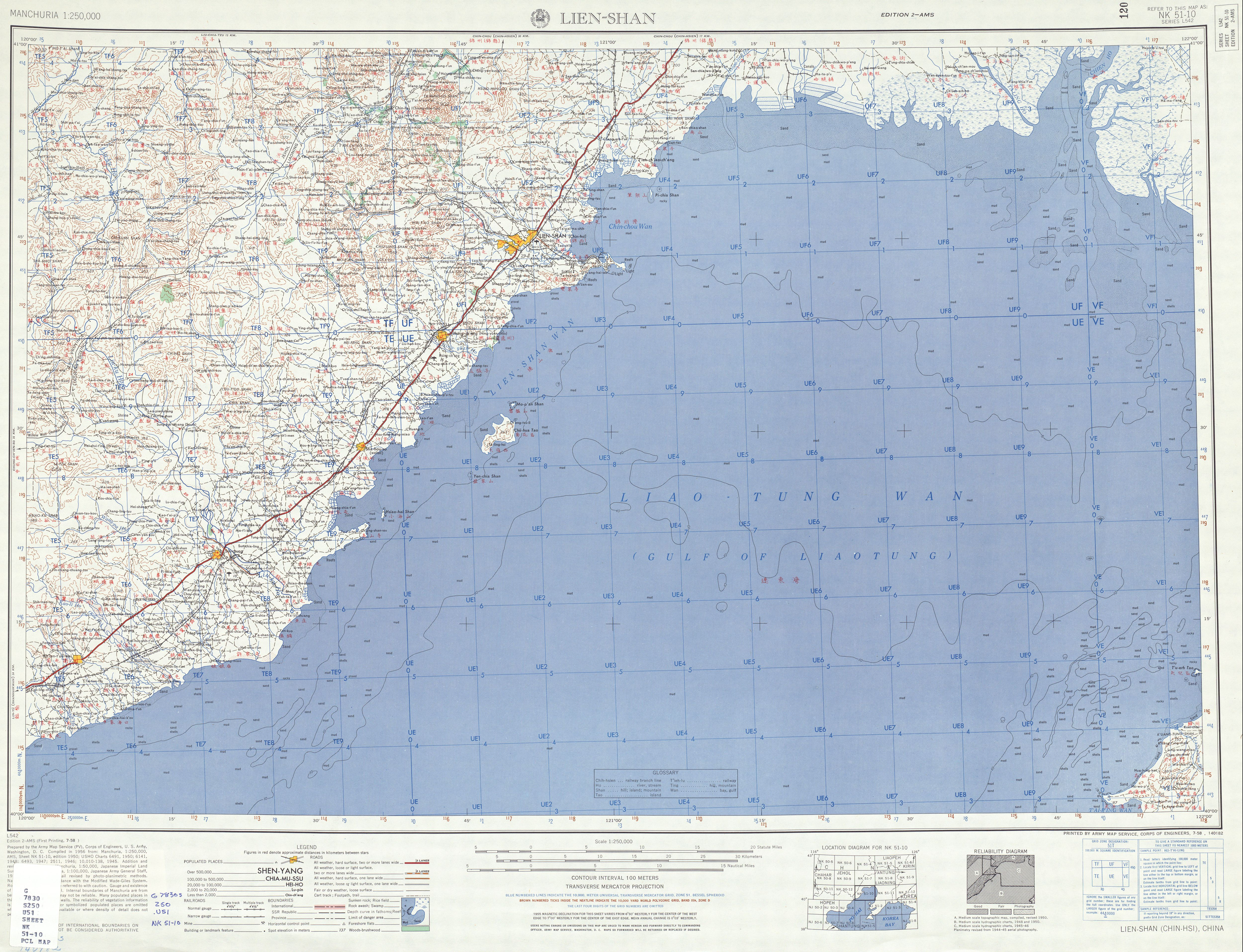
Lianshan (labelled as LIEN-SHAN (Chin-hsi) 連山(錦西)) (1956)

There are 11 subdistricts, seven towns, and eight townships within the district.

Subdistricts:

- Xinggong Subdistrict (兴工街道), Bohai Subdistrict (渤海街道), Huaji Subdistrict (化机街道), Lianshan Subdistrict (连山街道), Yilingba Subdistrict (一零八街道), Shuini Subdistrict (水泥街道), Zhanqian Subdistrict (站前街道), Huagong Subdistrict (化工街道), Shiyou Subdistrict (石油街道), Jinjiao Subdistrict (锦郊街道), Yangjiazhangzi Subdistrict (杨家仗子街道), Yangjiazhangzi Economic and Technological Development Zone (杨家杖子经济技术开发区)

Towns:

- Taijitun (台集屯镇), Si'erbao (寺儿堡镇), Jinxing (金星镇), Gangtun (钢屯镇), Hongluoxian (虹螺蚬镇), Gaoqiao (Kaokiao) (高桥镇), Gaoqiao Economic and Technological Development Zone (高桥经济技术开发区), Xintaimen (新台门镇)

Townships:

- Shanshenmiaozi Township (山神庙子乡), Baimashi Township (白马石乡), Shaheying Township (沙河营乡), Guchuyingzi Township (孤竹营子乡), Yangjiao Township (杨郊乡), Zhangxianggongtun Township (张相公屯乡), Tashan Township (塔山乡), Daxing Township (大兴乡)
