= Daxing Township, Huludao =

Daxing Township 大兴乡
- Township
- Location in Liaoning
- Coordinates: 40°57′42″N 120°57′8″E
- Country: People's Republic of China
- Province: Liaoning
- Prefecture-level city: Huludao
- District: Nanpiao District
- Time zone: UTC+8 (China Standard)

Daxing Township (simplified Chinese: 大兴乡; traditional Chinese: 大興鄉; pinyin: Dàxīng Xiāng) is a township under the administration of Nanpiao District, Huludao, Liaoning, China. As of 2018, it has 12 villages under its administration.
