= Shoushan =

Shoushan may refer to:

- Shoushan (Kaohsiung)
- Shoushan (Xingcheng)
