= Yuan Chonghuan =

Ming Chinese military commander (1584–1630)

- 袁崇煥
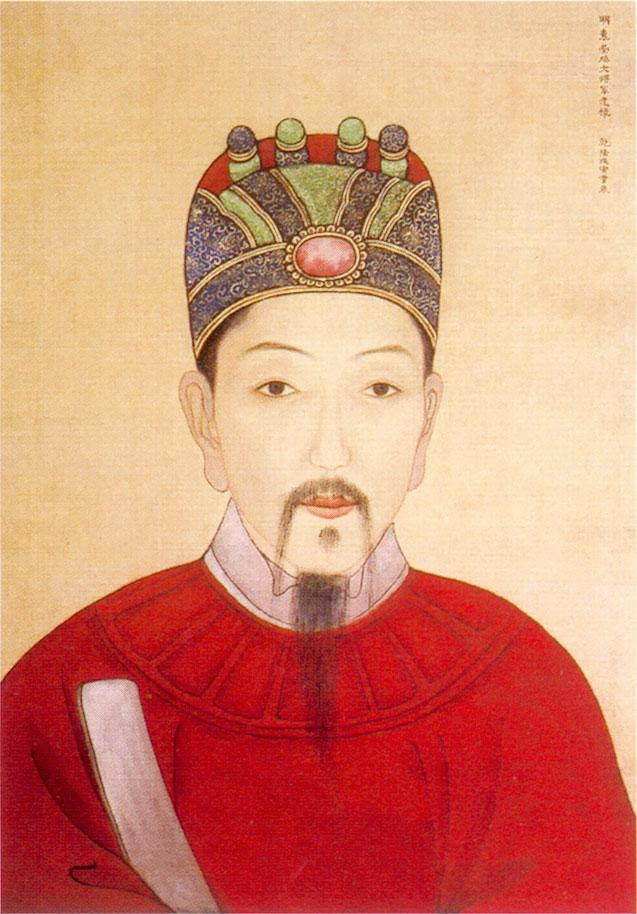
- Portrait of Yuan Chonghuan
- Born: 6 June 1584; Dongguan, Guangdong, Ming China
- Died: 22 September 1630 (aged 46); Xisi, Xicheng District, Beijing, Ming China
- Other names: Yuansu (元素); Ziru (自如)
- Occupations: Politician, general, writer

Yuan Chonghuan (Chinese: 袁崇煥; Jyutping: jyun4 sung4 wun6; pinyin: Yuán Chónghuàn; 6 June 1584 – 22 September 1630), courtesy name Yuansu, art name Ziru, was a Chinese politician, military general and writer who served under the Ming dynasty. Remembered as a national hero of Ming China and widely regarded as a culture hero in Chinese culture, he is best known for defending Liaoning from invasions launched by the Jurchen-led Later Jin dynasty. As a general, Yuan Chonghuan excelled as a cannoneer and sought to incorporate European cannon designs into the Ming arsenal.

Yuan's military career reached its height when he defeated the Later Jin ruler, Nurhaci, and his army in the first Battle of Ningyuan, that resulted in Nurhaci's death. Later on, Yuan also defeated Nurhaci's son and successor, Hong Taiji, and his 200,000-strong army composed of mostly ethnic Mongol soldiers at the second Battle of Ningyuan. Yuan met his end when he was arrested and executed by lingchi ("slow slicing") on the order of the Chongzhen Emperor under false charges of treason, which were believed to have been planted against him by the enemy court.

== Early life ==
Yuan was born in Dongguan, Guangdong. Another source suggest his ancestors came from Guangxi. During his adolescence, he spent time traveling from town to town. Although he took the imperial examination repeatedly with little success, he gained a lot of practical experience during his travels to the capital. It is said that he befriended several Jesuits during this time and spent much time working on modifying European cannons.

== Early military career ==
Yuan passed the imperial examination in 1619 and was appointed as the magistrate of Shaowu county, Fujian. In 1619, the Ming imperial army was defeated by the Jurchens in the Battle of Sarhu. Ming forces suffered successive defeats and in 1622 they were forced to retreat to Shanhai Pass, abandoning all of Liaoning to the Jurchens. After a visit to the front, Yuan was appointed as a second-class secretary in the Ministry of War, then promoted almost immediately to full secretary and supplied with funds for enlisting troops. Yuan's rapid promotion was quite notable at the time as he did not have any formal military training at all, save for studying the Confucian classics in order to pass the imperial examination.

Yuan cooperated with the commander-in-chief Sun Chengzong in pushing the frontiers steadily northward, fortifying Ningyuan in 1623. The elderly Sun was an able commander but refused to bribe Wei Zhongxian, an influential court eunuch under the Tianqi Emperor. Consequently, Sun was recalled in 1625 and replaced by Gao Di (高第), who ordered a general retreat to Shanhai Pass. However, Yuan flatly refused to leave Ningyuan.

Early in the next year, Nurhaci led the Jurchens back across the Liao River. Yuan and his deputies successfully held Ningyuan with the newly mounted and modified "hongyipao" and only 9,000 militiamen against Nurhaci's 130,000-strong army. The victory at Ningyuan prevented immediate advances by the Jurchens.

Yuan was said to have studied every aspect of the cannon for it to fire accurately at the position he wanted, and this is given as the reason why Nurhaci, although well-protected by his elite guards in a safe position, was wounded by cannon fire. After the battle, Yuan sent letters to ask the well-being of Nurhaci, as traditionally done by Chinese generals, but Nurhaci returned an insult by calling him duplicitous.

As a result of this victory, the Ming imperial court in Beijing appointed Yuan as the Governor of Liaodong on 27 February 1626, with full authority to handle all forces outside the passes.

During this time, Yuan executed Mao Wenlong, a Ming general regarded as ruthless but talented. Various texts have different opinions of his actions. Many stated this was a mistake since Mao could still be used against the Jurchens. However, Yuan took into account how Mao conducted his battles: Mao's tactics usually involved using civilian settlements as a shield for his troops, and during the occupation the civilians suffered tremendously. Mao also used the Joseon kingdom, Ming's ally, as a base to launch expeditions against the Jurchens. When the Jurchens entered Joseon, Mao ordered a general retreat of Ming forces. This angered many merchants in the Beijing area who traded in the Korean Peninsula. In addition, Mao was known to have bribed many corrupt eunuchs and officials. Consequently, by executing Mao, Yuan made enemies with some of the most influential people in China.

Taking advantage of Nurhaci's death later in the year, Yuan reoccupied Jinzhou. The Jurchens reappeared in June and withdrew after a series of indecisive battles. Yuan was criticised by the partisans of Wei Zhongxian, who stated that he took too long to fight off the Jurchens. Shortly thereafter Yuan was forced into retirement.

== Later military career and death ==
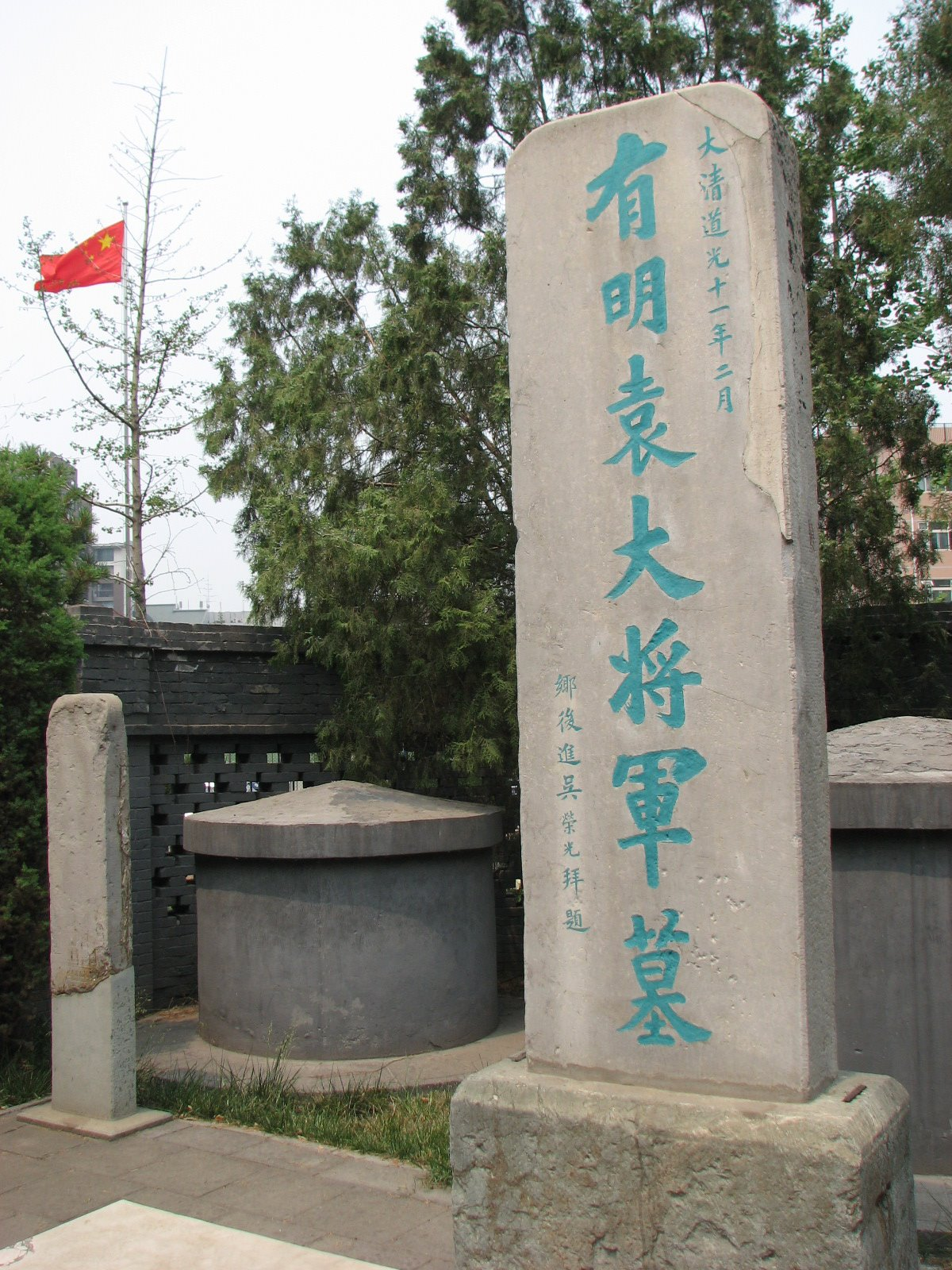
Yuan Chonghuan's tomb in the Huashi neighborhood, near Guangqumen, in Chongwen District, Beijing.

In 1628, under the reign of the Chongzhen Emperor, Yuan was reinstated as the field marshal of all the Ming forces in the northeast. He embarked on an ambitious five-year plan for the complete recovery of Liaodong. The Chongzhen Emperor had begun his reign in 1627 at the age of 16, and in 1629 (at the age of 18) he appointed Yuan. In 1629, Yuan was granted the title of "Senior Guardian of the Heir Apparent". The emperor gave Yuan his Imperial Sword and stated that he would fully support Yuan's decisions.

This time Yuan had to face again a larger Jurchen force of over 200,000 troops under Nurhaci's successor, Hong Taiji. The Jurchens had incorporated more men into their army, including the newly surrendered Mongols and Ming rebels. They conquered various small tribes in northern China, and defeated Joseon in order to secure it as a tributary. However, the Jurchens did not attack Jinzhou or Ningyuan again. Instead, they bypassed Jinzhou, Ningyuan and Shanhai Pass altogether, breaking through the Great Wall west of Shanhai Pass, and reaching the north of Beijing in the winter of 1629. Yuan rushed back with a select veteran force from Ningyuan to defend the capital. He reached Beijing just days before the Jurchens. Outside the city wall of Beijing, he defeated the Jurchen Eight Banners which numbered around 100,000 men, but failed to destroy the Jurchen army. The Jurchens' surprise attack on Beijing was foiled. Despite the fact that Yuan prevented the Jurchens from even reaching the city wall, Yuan was heavily criticized when he arrived in Beijing, and some eunuchs even accused Yuan of collaborating with the enemy.

The Chongzhen Emperor ordered Yuan's arrest during an audience on 13 January 1630. Despite little evidence, Yuan was accused of collusion with the enemy and sentenced to death by lingchi ("slow slicing") at Ganshiqiao (甘石橋) in Beijing. When Yuan was asked for last words before his execution, he produced the following poem: "A life's work always ends up in vain; half of my career seems to be in dreams. I do not worry about lacking brave warriors after my death, for my loyal spirit will continue to guard Liaodong." (一生事業總成空，半世功名在夢中。死後不愁無將勇，忠魂依舊守遼東！)

Imperial records showed he took half a day to die.

Yuan was mourned throughout most of the country outside Beijing and even in the kingdom of Joseon. After his death, many took note of the Ming and their allies' weak position as favorable conditions for another Jurchen invasion.

It was said that upon hearing of his apparent "betrayal", many Beijing residents hated Yuan so much that they rushed to buy his body parts so they could eat them as soon as they were sliced off his body. He was left there after the torture, shouting for half a day before stopping. His head, the only recognisable part after the execution, was taken outside the Inner City Wall by a city guard, whose surname was She (佘), and buried in Huashi near Guangqumen. The guard's family have guarded it for generations since. His tomb was recently renovated and renamed the Yuan Chonghuan Memorial, located at Longtan Park.

== Legacy ==
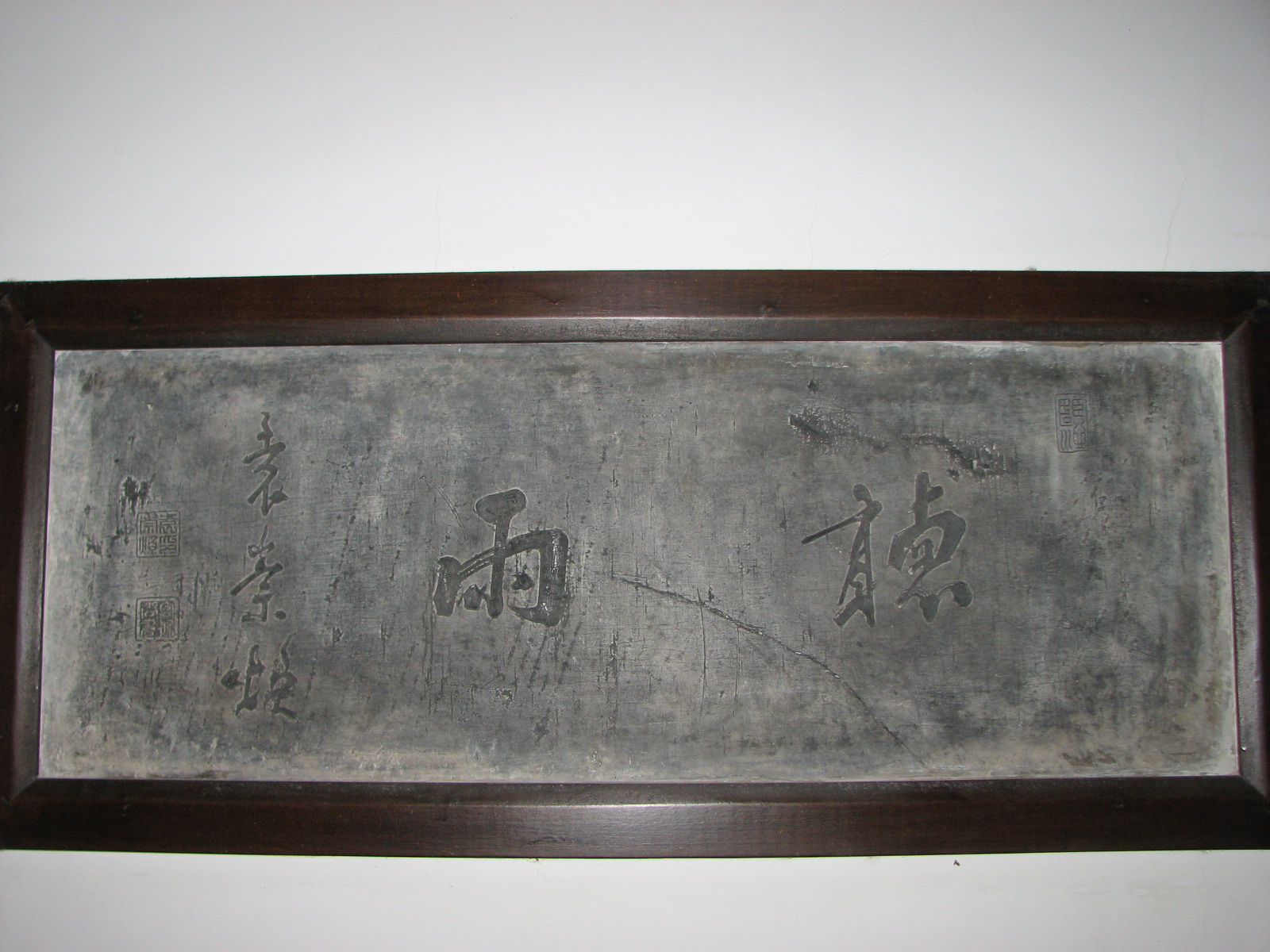
"Listening to the rain" (聽雨) by Yuan Chonghuan, kept at his memorial in Beijing.

Yuan's name was cleared nearly a century later by the Qianlong Emperor of the Qing dynasty, after conclusive evidence was found in old archives of the Qing imperial court supporting his innocence. The Qianlong Emperor tried to express his kindness by searching for and rewarding Yuan's direct descendants, but failed to find any.

Yuan Chonghuan's son defected from the Ming to the Qing and in 1642 was placed in the Han Chinese Plain White Banner. Yuan Chonghuan's sixth generation descendant lived during the Taiping rebellion and was the Qing Jiangsu governor, Fumingga (Fuming'a) (富明阿, or Yuan Shifu 袁世福, courtesy name Zhi'an 治安). Despite being a Han Chinese bannerman (漢軍八旗) he used a Manchu personal name. From 1866 to 1870 the Qing appointed Fumingga as the Jilin governor in Manchuria. Fumingga had a son named Shoushan (Shou Shan, 寿山, courtesy name Meifeng 眉峰) born in 1860 in Aigun, Heilongjiang in Manchuria. Shoushan along with his younger brother fought in Fengtian and was wounded against the Japanese in the First Sino-Japanese War in 1894. His brother died in the war. Before that Shoushan spent the last 6 years holding hereditary posts in Beijing. After the war he was sent in central China to be appointed to a position in Kaifeng and after that he was sent back to his Aigun hometown as military lieutenant-governor or brigade-general (fudutong). He could speak some Russian, had visited Blagoveshchensk and was an Amur native. The Qing promoted him to Heilongjiang military governor in January 1900. The Fengtian and Jilin governors along with Shoushan all received orders to fight the Russian empire during the Boxer Rebellion in July 1900 from Beijing. The war started with Blagoveshchensk being shelled and Aigun being destroyed by the Russians. A ceasure was attempted by Shoushan to prevent Qiqihar, the capital of Heilongjiang from being occupied. He received no response so Major General Pavel Rennenkampf received Shoushan's surrender on 28 August since no response to the ceasefire proposal was made. Shoushan then committed suicide by asking subordinate or a son to kill him by shooting after swallowing gold. Because Shoushan was married to a Mongol woman, his body was sent to Inner Mongolia from Qiqihar before the Russians occupied Qiqihar. Shoushan called for Heilongjiang to be further colonized by Han people to prevent Russian encroachment. Shoushan's Mongol wife was a daughter of the Mongol chief of the Dorbod Banner. One of his family members, Yuan Ruizhang (袁瑞昌) who was a northern route barracks officer (北路营官) died in battle against the Tsarist Russian forces in Heihe.

== Physical appearance ==
Ming dynasty scholars described Yuan as a short-tempered person with a tiny body frame, and because of his appearance, the Chongzhen Emperor was highly doubtful about his abilities when he first met Yuan.

== In popular culture ==
In the wuxia novel Sword Stained with Royal Blood by Jin Yong, Yuan is survived by a fictional son, Yuan Chengzhi, the protagonist of the novel. Yuan Chengzhi was saved by his father's subordinates after his father was executed and taken to the Mount Hua School, where he learnt martial arts. Several years later, when he had grown up, he left Mount Hua and traveled around in search of adventure and to redress his father's legacy.

Celebrated as a Cantonese hero, during a 2010 rally, protesters in Guangzhou used Yuan's battle cry against his Jurchen enemies during the Battle of Ningyuan: "Fuck his mom! Hit the hard!" [sic] (掉哪媽! 頂硬上!) as a chant, in reference to the removal of the relevant (English-Cantonese bilingual) plaque from a statue of Yuan.

In the 2017 TVB drama A General, a Scholar and a Eunuch, Yuan Chonghuan was portrayed by Edwin Siu.

== See also ==
- Zu Dashou
- Wu Sangui
- Hong Chengchou
- Man Gui

=== Other admired generals falsely executed for treason ===
- Yu Qian
- Yue Fei
- Gao Jiong
- Yuwen Xian
- Gao Changgong
- Hulü Guang
- Zhou Yafu
- Mikhail Tukhachevsky
- Flavius Stilicho
- Flavius Aetius
