= Cui Yitian =

Chinese politician

- Chinese: 崔义田

Vice Minister of Health of the People's Republic of China

Personal details
- Born: 1906 Jinxi, Liaoning, China
- Died: 12 June 1989 (aged 82–83) Beijing

Cui Yitian (Chinese: 崔义田; 1906–12 June 1989) was a Chinese politician, military medical official, and public health administrator of the People's Republic of China.

Cui was born in 1906 in Jinxi in the Chinese province of Liaoning. He began his studies in 1929 at Liaoning Medical College, graduated in 1935, and became employed at the college as a surgeon. Cui became a member of the New Fourth Army in 1938 and joined the Chinese Communist Party in 1940. After the Chinese Civil War, he became a vice minister of health.

Cui died in Beijing on 12 June 1989.
