= Longtan Lake Park =

Public park in Dongcheng, Beijing, China

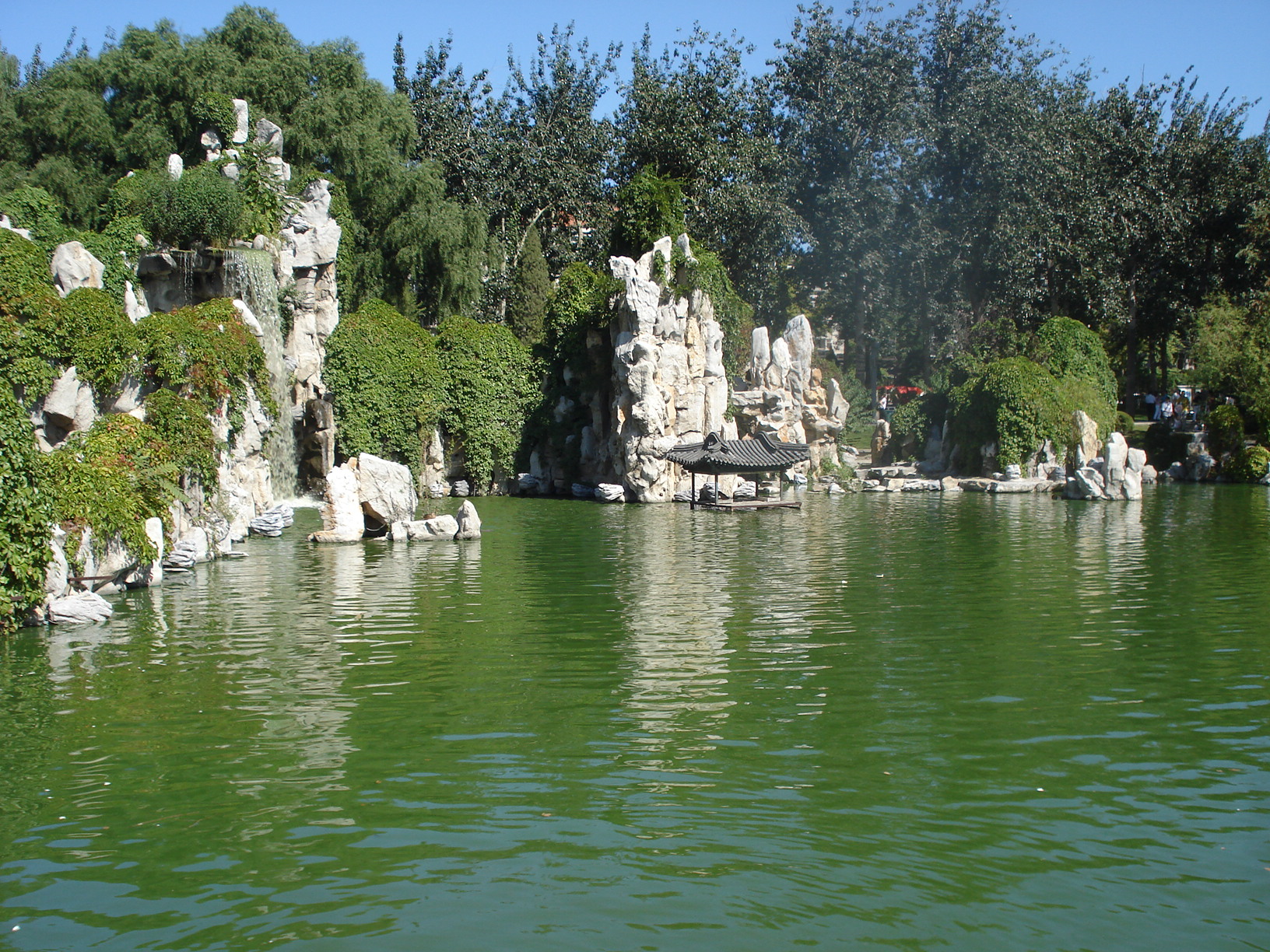
- Longtan Lake Park

- Location within Beijing Location within China
- Type: Urban park
- Location: Beijing, China
- Coordinates: 39°52′36″N 116°26′05″E
- Area: 120 hectares (300 acres)
- Created: 1952
- Status: Open all year

Longtan Lake Park (simplified Chinese: 龙潭湖公园; traditional Chinese: 龍潭湖公園; pinyin: Lóngtánhú Gōngyuán; lit. 'Pool of the Dragon'), is a recreational urban park located in Dongcheng District (formerly in Chongwen District) of Beijing, just east of the Temple of Heaven. It is one of the largest modern parks inside the 2nd Ring Road. It has a large outdoor bird market. The main landscape feature is the lake with moon bridges, rock gardens, dragon boats, tea houses and restaurants. Some other attractions are also located in the park, such as a temple dedicated to Yuan Chonghuan, a collection of tablets, a series of hills, a waterfall and the "Gardens of Chinese Dragons".

Longtan Lake is located on an earth and mud quarry created during the Jiajing Emperor's reign of the Ming Dynasty; the material was used to make bricks for the outer city's wall. Afterwards, the pit filled with wastewater from the city. In 1952, Beijing government decided to address the environmental problem of the lake. Architect Liang Sicheng was invited to re-design the area as a public park. The wastewater was diverted and removed, and replaced with freshwater to create the current lake.

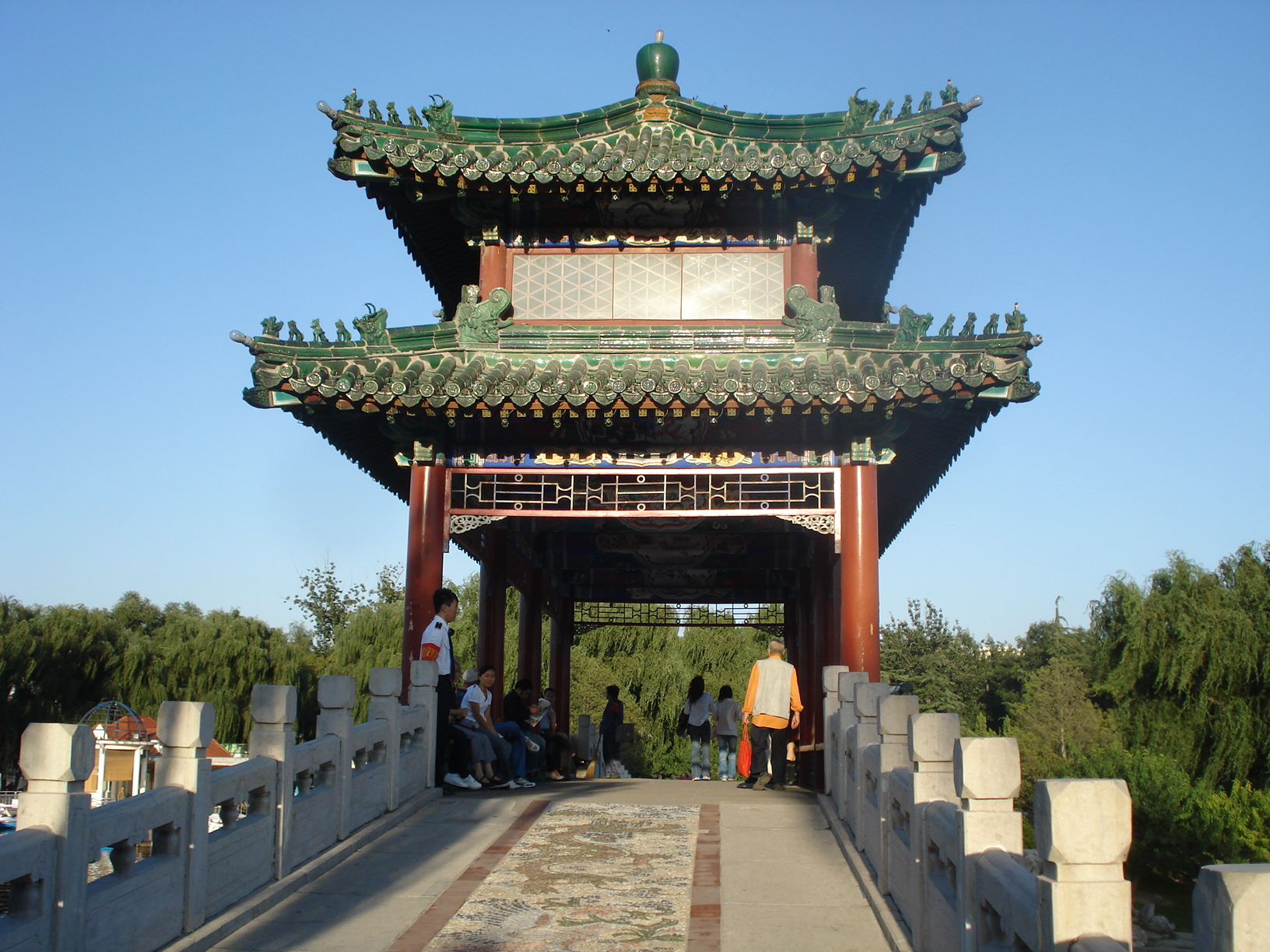

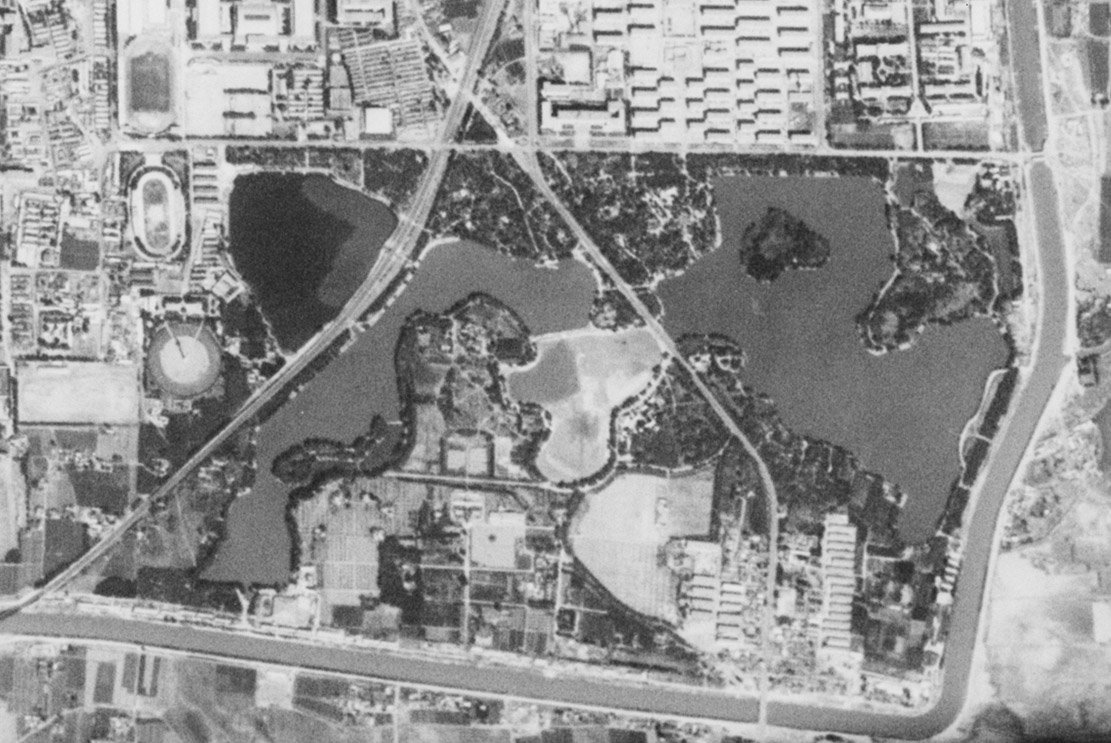
Satellite image of Longtan Park. (1967-09-20)
