= Battle of Ningyuan =

1626 battle

- Part of the Ming-Qing transition
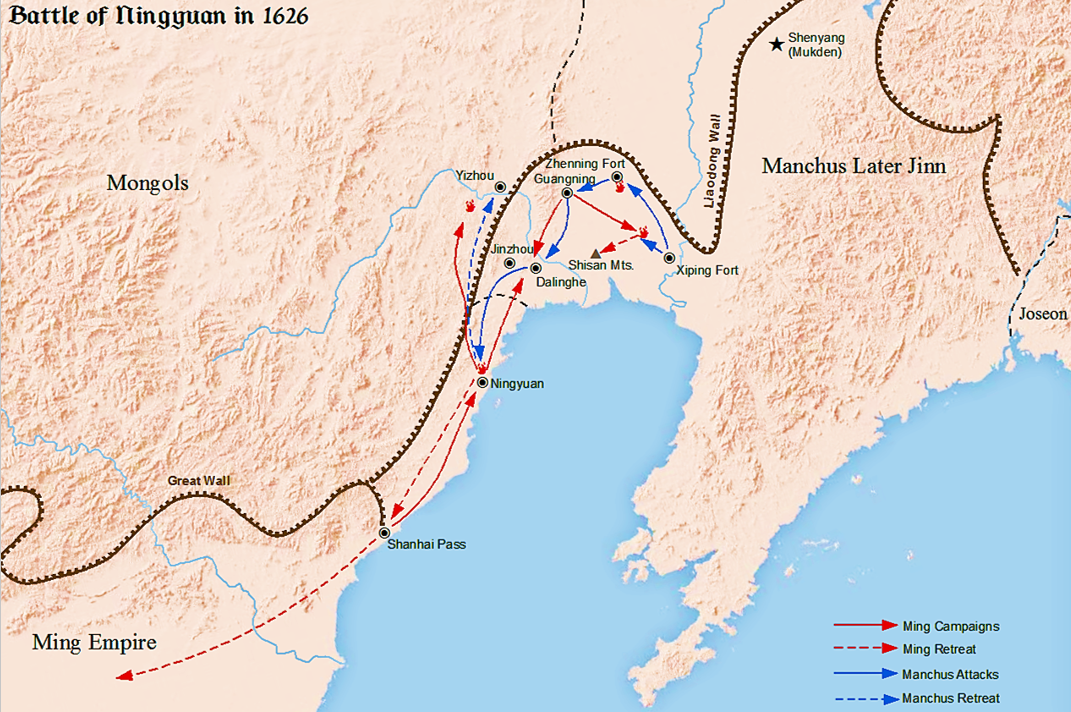
- Battle of Ningyuan
Date	2–10 February 1626
Location	Xingcheng, Liaoning
Result	Ming victory

Belligerents
Later Jin	Ming dynasty

Commanders and leaders
Nurhaci (WIA); Wunage	Yuan Chonghuan; Man Gui; Zu Dashou; Zhu Mei; Zuo Fu; He Kegang; Yang Qi; Jin Guan †; Jin Shilin †; Yao Fumin †; Yao Yuxian †; Sun Yuanhua; Mao Wenlong

Strength
130,000	Ningyuan: 20,000; Juehua Island: 7,000

Casualties and losses
2,750+ Nurhaci is wounded and later dies	Juehua Island: 6,000-7,000

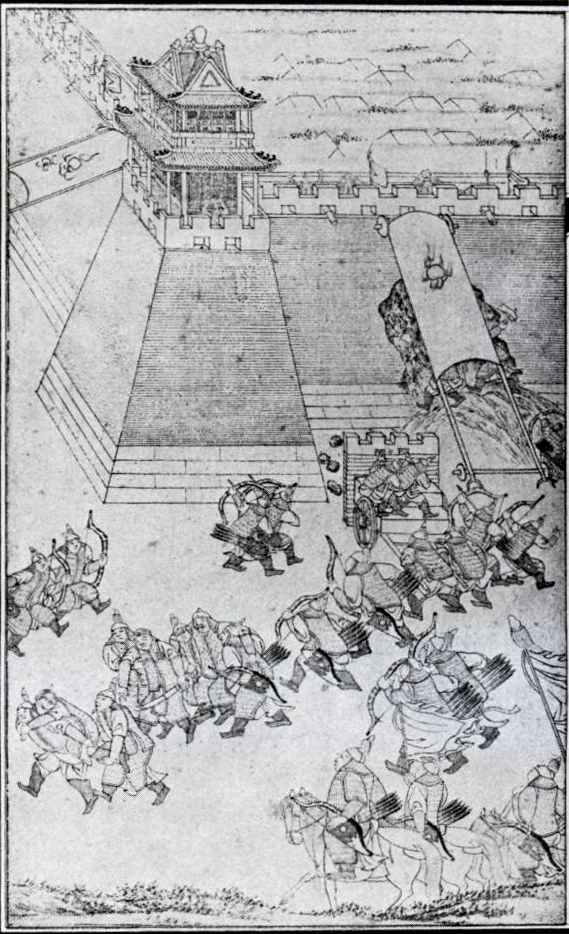
Jurchens attacking the city wall during the Battle of Ningyuan

The Battle of Ningyuan (simplified Chinese: 宁远之战; traditional Chinese: 寧遠之戰; pinyin: Níngyuǎn Zhī Zhàn) took place between the Ming dynasty and the Later Jin dynasty in 1626. The Later Jin had been waging war on the Ming for several years, and their leader Nurhaci had deemed Ningyuan to be a suitable target for his attack, in part due to advice from a Ming defector, Li Yongfang. Later Jin failed to take the city and Nurhaci was wounded in the assault, dying eight months later. The Ming emerged victorious, marking a temporary resurgence of the Ming army after an eight-year-long series of defeats.

== Background ==
The Ming had suffered a series of defeats against the Jurchens prior to 1626 and lost the key city of Shenyang in 1621 and the port city of Lüshun in 1625.

Part of the Ming army's new strategy of defense was to develop Ningyuan into a military stronghold. Yuan Chonghuan, with the support of Sun Chengzong, was assigned the task of conducting a major strengthening of Ningyuan's defenses in anticipation of a Jurchen attack. However, the defensive preparation was hindered when Sun Chengzong was replaced by a new commander due to Wei Zhongxian's purge of all Donglin movement (eastern forest) elements in the Ming court. Officials deemed to have any connection to the Donglin faction were removed, and in some cases faced arrest, torture, and execution. Sun Chengzong was replaced with the new commander Gao Di by the end of 1625. Gao Di ordered all Ming forces outside the Great Wall to retreat and abandon land outside Shanhai Pass. Yuan objected strongly and was thus left to command a lone army guarding Ningyuan. Yuan was left with only 20,000 men under his command.

In 1626 Nurhaci received news of the Ming retreat and decided to advance towards Ningyuan on the advice of a Chinese defector, Li Yongfang. He personally led a force of 100,000–130,000 (at least 60,000) to take Ningyuan. Initially Nurhaci attempted to convince Ningyuan's defenders to simply surrender, and sent a letter boasting that he had an army of 200,000, but Yuan did not believe him, and retorted that he had perhaps 130,000. In addition Yuan declared that he and his commanders Man Gui, Zu Dashou, and He Kegang were ready to fight to the death. He was said to have quoted an ancient maxim at that point, saying, "Those who seek life will die, but those who welcome death will live."

Yuan ordered everything outside Ningyuan to be burnt, including the houses, so that there would be nothing of use to the Jurchens. Heavy cannons were set up along the city walls and gunners from Fujian assigned to them. Lines of saltpeter were placed at the base of the walls to prevent sappers. The day before the battle Yuan personally walked along the walls inspecting their defenses and publicly declared his defiance against the Later Jin by conducting a blood pact with his remaining soldiers – a public notice of defiance was written in his blood. Yuan then sent orders to Shanhai Pass to execute any deserters they found, thus greatly boosting the city's morale.

== Course of battle ==
The Jin army arrived and set up camp around the city, but they had misjudged the range of Ming cannons, which opened fire on them, and they were forced to retreat.

The battle began with Nurhaci personally leading an attack on the southwest corner of the city, which he deemed to be the most vulnerable. Ming cannons opened fire and inflicted heavy casualties on the Jin cavalry.

Jin forces assaulted the city from another side using reinforced siege carts while archers provided cover fire, hoping to draw out the defenders so that their "iron cavalry" could flank them. However, in addition to regular cannon shots, the defenders also launched poisonous bombs which prevented the Jin forces from advancing, and their siege carts were shot to pieces. Some managed to reach the walls, but the lines of saltpeter that the Ming had previously set up were ignited, creating a protective barrier of fire around the city. Following up Yuan sent forth a squad of "expendables" who finished off the rest of the siege carts. Meanwhile, the Jin were attacking another corner of the city but were repulsed by burning oil and incendiary attacks. Bed sheets covered in gunpowder and oil were dropped on them. Jin forces retreated that night.

Seeing that the siege was not going well, Nurhaci detailed a contingent of Mongol cavalry led by Jurchen general Wunage (武讷格) to attack the island of Juehua, which served as the primary granary of Ningyuan. Defenses at Juehua had been lax due to the belief that the Jin could not invade the island as they had no boats, and were poor sailors. However, the water around Juehua froze that year, and the Jin army was able to cross with their cavalry. The attack killed thousands and many grain stores were destroyed, but the island itself held for the time being.

After several days of failed assaults, Ningyuan had still not fallen and instead inflicted heavy losses on the Jin forces. Nurhaci himself was wounded by a cannon shot and decided to withdraw to Mukden.

== Aftermath ==
269 heads were taken by Yuan Chonghuan's forces and delivered to Beijing as a token of their victory. Yuan was promoted to Censor-in-Chief of the Right. Yuan promoted his strategy of fortifying key cities to retake lost land and began constructing defenses for Jinzhou further north of Ningyuan. The Tianqi Emperor dispatched 40,000 troops to aid in Yuan's construction projects.

Nurhaci succumbed to his wounds and died in Mukden eight months later. His eighth son, the fourth Beile, Hong Taiji, assumed the title of the Great Khan of the Later Jin. Hong Taiji, like his father, was defeated in the Battle of Ning-Jin a year later. While the failure to take Ningyuan temporarily halted the Jurchen advance, the Later Jin increased pressure in the Bohai Gulf and the kingdom of Joseon.

On the whole, the Jurchens were not able to break the defense of the Ningyuan garrison even after the death of Yuan Chonghuan. However, in 1644, the Ming emperor ordered the Ningyuan garrison to withdraw to Beijing to defend it against Li Zicheng's rebel army. The Ningyuan garrison was unable to reach Beijing before it fell and the Ming emperor committed suicide. Subsequently, the Manchus defeated the rebel army and captured Beijing.

== See also ==
- Timeline of the Ming dynasty
- Timeline of the Qing dynasty

== Bibliography ==
- Swope, Kenneth (2014), The Military Collapse of China's Ming Dynasty, Routledge
- Wakeman, Frederic (1977). Fall of Imperial China. Simon and Schuster. ISBN 978-0-02-933680-9.
- Wakeman, Frederic (1985), The Great Enterprise: The Manchu Reconstruction of Imperial Order in Seventeenth-Century China, vol. 1, University of California Press
