= Longgang District, Huludao =

Longgang 龙港区
- District
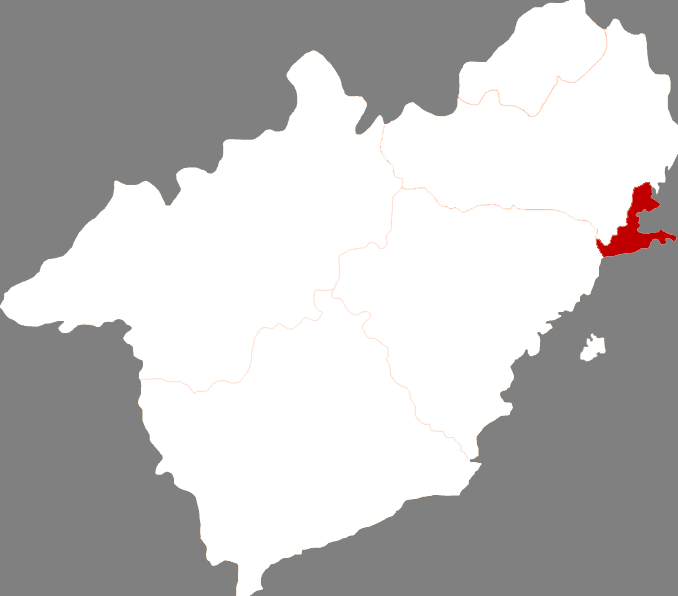
- Location in Huludao
- Coordinates: 40°44′08″N 121°53′38″E
- Country: China
- Province: Liaoning
- Prefecture-level city: Huludao
- District seat: Yuhuang Subdistrict

Area
  - Total: 175.71 km^{2} (67.84 sq mi)

Population (2020 census)
  - Total: 294,250
  - Density: 1,674.6/km^{2} (4,337.3/sq mi)
- Time zone: UTC+8 (China Standard)
- Website: www.lgq.gov.cn

Longgang District (simplified Chinese: 龙港区; traditional Chinese: 龍港區; pinyin: Lónggǎng Qū; lit. 'Dragon Port') is a district of Huludao, Liaoning, China. It is by far the smallest division of Huludao City with an area of just 138 square kilometres (53 sq mi), and along with Lianshan District is one of the two districts within which Huludao city itself is situated.

Longgang district encompasses the new district of Huludao city, and includes Longbeishan Park, Longwan Beach, Wanghai Temple and the Huludao shipyard within its boundaries.

== Administrative divisions ==
There are 8 subdistricts and 1 township within the district.

- Huludao Subdistrict (葫芦岛街道)
- Mazhangfang Subdistrict (马仗房街道)
- Binhai Subdistrict (滨海街道)
- Shuanglong Subdistrict (双龙街道)
- Yuhuang Subdistrict (玉皇街道)
- Lianwan Subdistrict (连湾街道)
- Beigang Subdistrict (北港街道)
- Shuangshu Township (双树乡)
