= Liaoning Finance and Trade College =

College in Liaoning, China

Liaoning Finance and Trade College (simplified Chinese: 辽宁财贸学院; traditional Chinese: 遼寧財貿學院; pinyin: Liáoníng cáimào xuéyuàn), formerly known as Shenyang Shifan University Bohai College, is a small, partially walled private undergraduate college located on the Liaodong Bay of the Bohai coast in Xingcheng, southwest of Huludao in Liaoning province on the east coast of China.

== Academic year ==
The college's academic term is the semester.

New students start arriving at the end of August each year and complete a few weeks of compulsory military training before beginning their studies. Returning students arrive to resume classes at the beginning of September. The Fall semester ends at the beginning of January. The Spring semester starts at the beginning of March and ends at the beginning of July. A few national holidays are observed each semester.

Students typically spend the last week of each semester sitting exams. After exams are finished the students are required to vacate their dorms until the following semester. As a result, the campus is like a ghost town for most of January, February, July, and August although there are workers present and security personnel vigilant.

Although it is a four-year institution, most students only attend classes the first three years. Come the fourth year, most students seek internships or employment and return periodically for examinations before graduation.

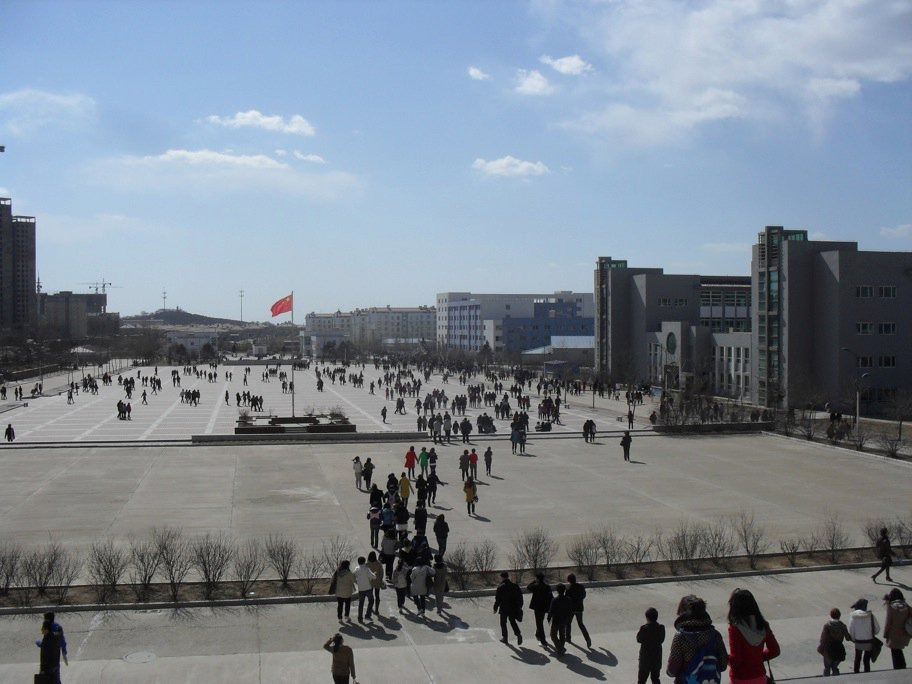
A view of the campus courtyard from the northernmost lecture hall, Spring 2011 (est.).

== Student life ==
Upon matriculation, the students are grouped together in classes that range in size between 30 and 160 students, depending on which major they have been assigned. These groups—or classes—attend the same courses at the same time with the same classmates for the duration of their college career. The courses that the students take and when they take them are decided and mandated by their department's administration. Attendance is mandatory.

Many aspects of the students' lives are overseen by resident assistants and monitors. The students typically engage in very few extracurricular activities as their typical day is full of classes, study time, and sometimes mandatory group exercise (PE). Classes run Monday through Friday with possible commitments over the weekend. Class days are divided up into eight 45-minute academic hours with 10 and 20 minute breaks in between. The day starts at 08:00 and ends at 16:50. Everyone breaks for lunch at the same time, between 11:40 and 13:20.

Students are required to live on campus in gender-restricted dormitories. Each dorm room houses 4-6 students. The students share public half baths with cold water only in the dormitories; they go to off-campus bath houses to bathe. There are laundry and hot water facilities in a facility adjacent the dormitories. The students have a curfew at night during which they must be in their dorm rooms and the power is turned off.

There are computers on campus but their use is strictly limited to certain users. There is also a library, a study hall, and an auditorium used for orientations, assemblies, and events.

There is a canteen on campus where the students can chow. The food is considered to be very basic but inexpensive. There are ATMs, a China Post office offering EMS service, China Mobile and China Unicom offices, and a "Western-style" fast food restaurant. There is a dry good store on campus between the dormitories.

There are basketball, tennis, and badminton courts with some exercise equipment. There is also a soccer (football) field.

Part of the student body participated in the campus ceremonies supporting the area's first International Swimsuit Festival in 2011.

== Academia ==
The teaching staff ranges from semi-retired career academics to new teachers. Many reside on campus in private dorms or apartments.

Economics, Art, Tourism, Trade, Chinese and English are among the major disciplines offered.

Most of the classrooms have projectors, computers, and large flat screen TVs. There are also some listening labs for language students.

== Administration ==
=== Faculty ===
There is a full-time teaching staff of 668 teachers.

=== Students ===
The university has a full-time student population of 10,501.
