= Man Gui =

Man Gui (Chinese: 滿桂; died 1629) was a Ming Dynasty General (總兵) of Mongol origin. The History of Ming describes him as a blunt man who was known for his strength, valour and mounted archery skills.

== Biography ==
First spotted in an inspection tour by Grand-Secretary Sun Chengzong due to his impressive looks and physique, he was highly prominent under Marshal Yuan Chonghuan. He served under Yuan Chonghuan in the Battle of Ningyuan and in the Battle of Ning-Jin (Ningyuan and Jinzhou).

After the arrest of Yuan Chonghuan by the Ming emperor due to false charges, Man Gui became the main commander and was killed in combat in the battle of Beijing in 1629.
