= Shoushan (Xingcheng) =

Mountain in Liaoning, China

Shoushan or Shou Mountain is a mountain located in Xingcheng, Liaoning, China. Its height is 329.7 metres (1,082 ft).

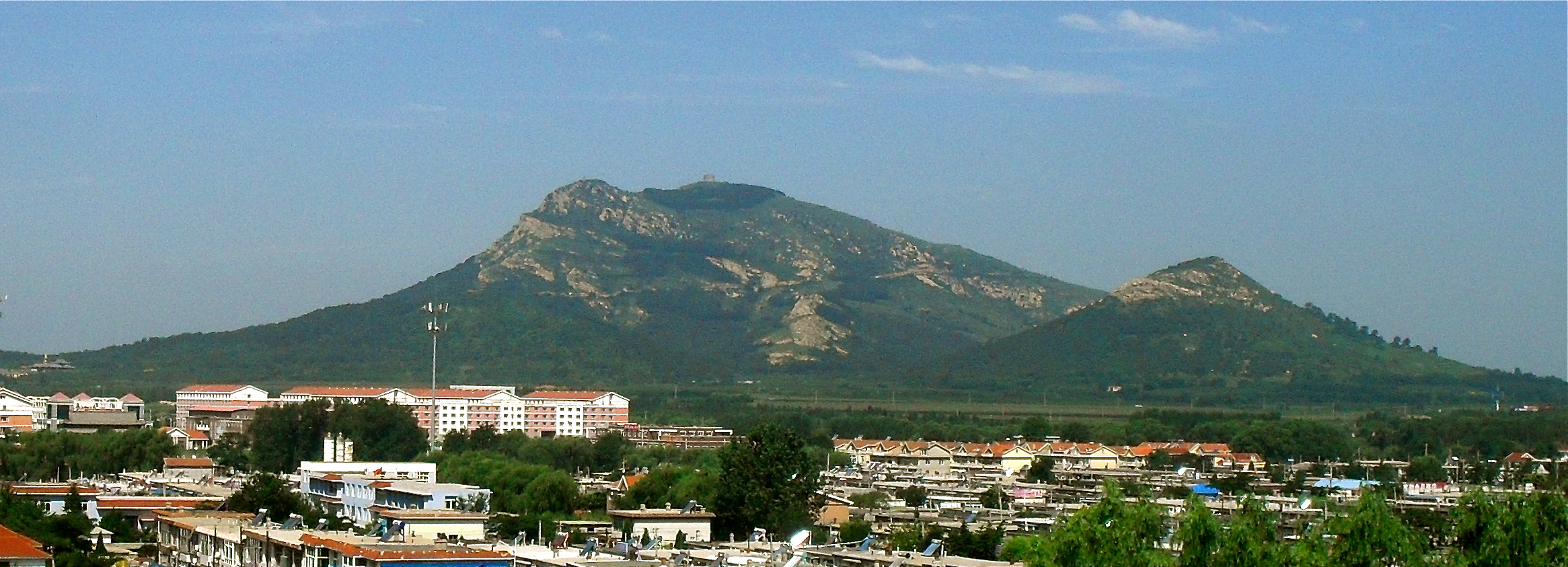
A view of the mountain from Liaoning Finance and Trade College

There is an ancient beacon tower which was built during the Ming Dynasty in the middle of Mount Shou. Its diameter is 13 meters, and its height is 7 meters. Although this building suffered hundreds of years of weathering by wind and rain, it still stands on the top of the mountain.

== Repairs ==
The restoration project of the beacon tower on the mountain began on May 15 2022, and was completed on August 10, 2022. The repairs were undertaken using traditional techniques to protect the relic.
