= Nanpiao District =

Coordinates: 41°06′25″N 120°45′00″E

Nanpiao 南票区
- District
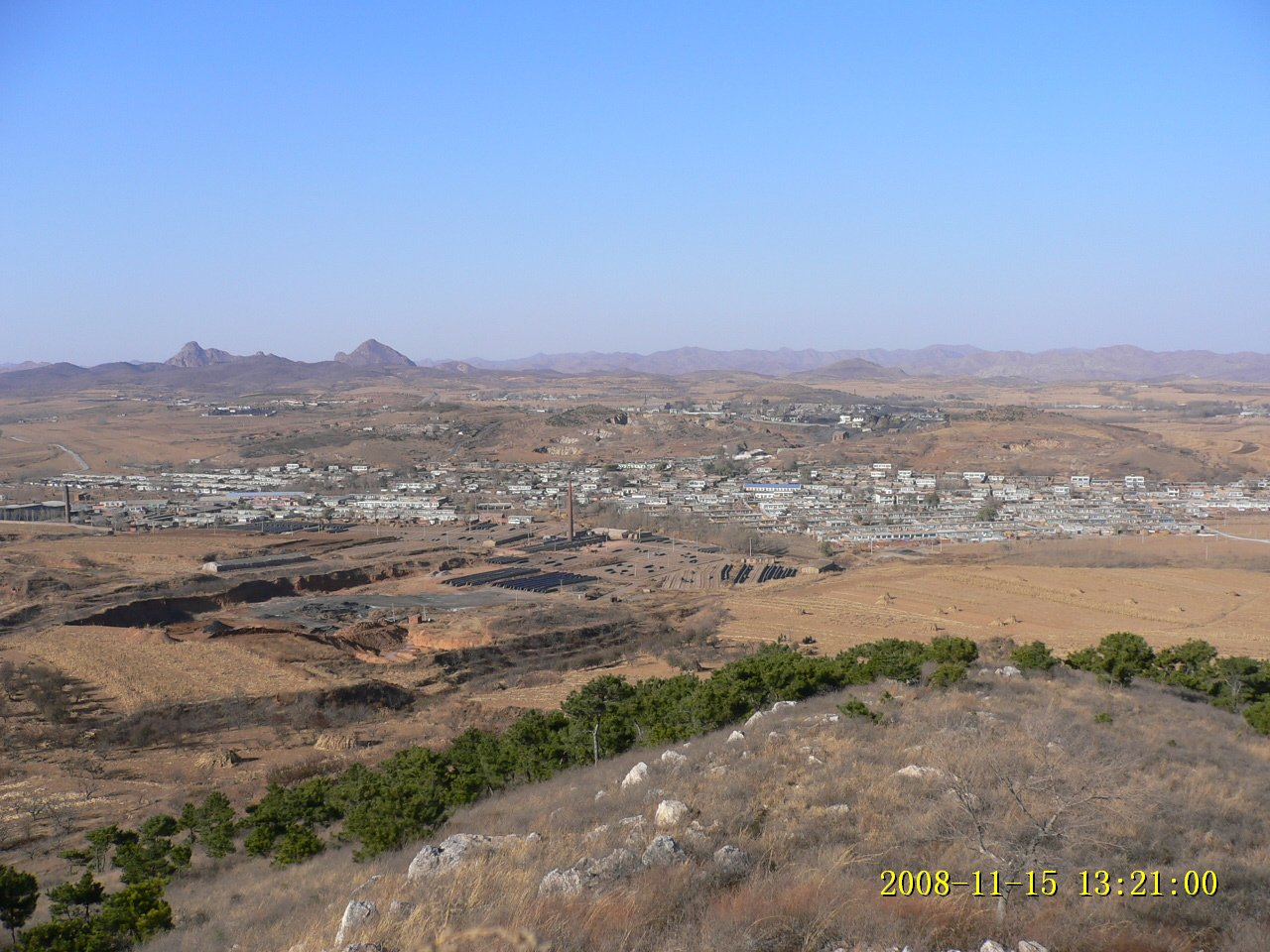

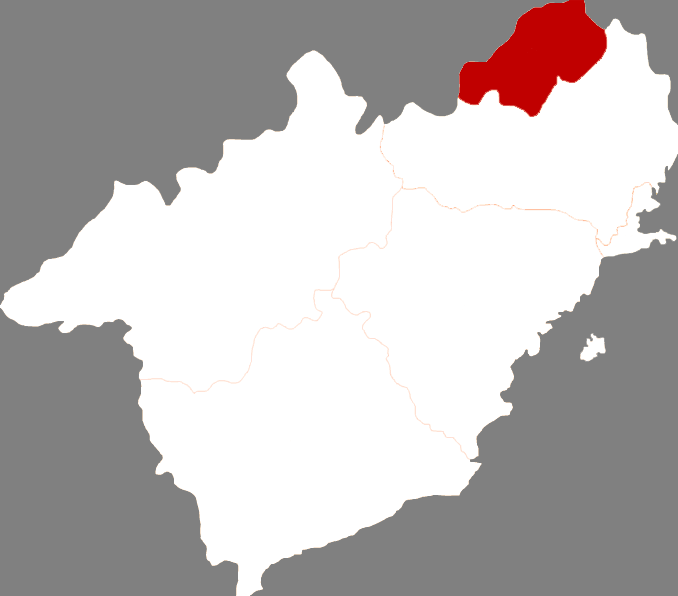
- Nanpiao in Huludao

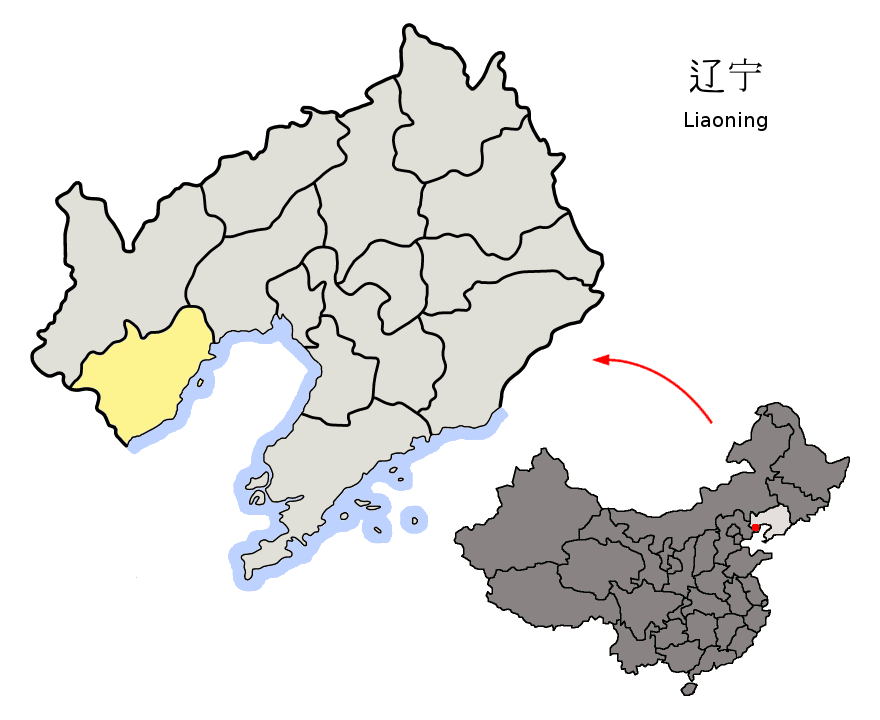
- Huludao in Liaoning
- Country: People's Republic of China
- Province: Liaoning
- Prefecture-level city: Huludao

Population (2020 census)
  - Total: 182,135
- Time zone: UTC+8 (China Standard)

Nanpiao District (simplified Chinese: 南票区; traditional Chinese: 南票區; pinyin: Nánpiào Qū) is a district under the administration of the city of Huludao, Liaoning province, People's Republic of China. It is a mostly rural district containing no large urban centres, and comprises an area of 512 square kilometres (198 sq mi), in the northernmost part of Huludao City.

The administrative center of the district is Nanpiao town, which is linked to central Huludao by bus and train services.

== Administrative divisions ==
There are seven subdistricts, two towns, and two townships within the district.

Subdistricts:

- Jiulong Subdistrict, Jiulong Subdistrict (九龙街道), Qiupigou Subdistrict (邱皮沟街道), Xiaolinghe Subdistrict (小凌河街道), Zhaojiatun Subdistrict (赵家屯街道), Weizigou Subdistrict (苇子沟街道), Shaguotun Subdistrict (沙锅屯街道), Sanjiazi Subdistrict (三家子街道)

Towns:

- Nuanchitang (暖池塘镇), Gangyaoling (缸窑岭镇)

Townships:

- Shaguotun Township (沙锅屯乡), Huangtukan Township (黄土坎乡)
