= Huludao =

Huludao 葫芦岛市 Hulutao
- Prefecture-level city
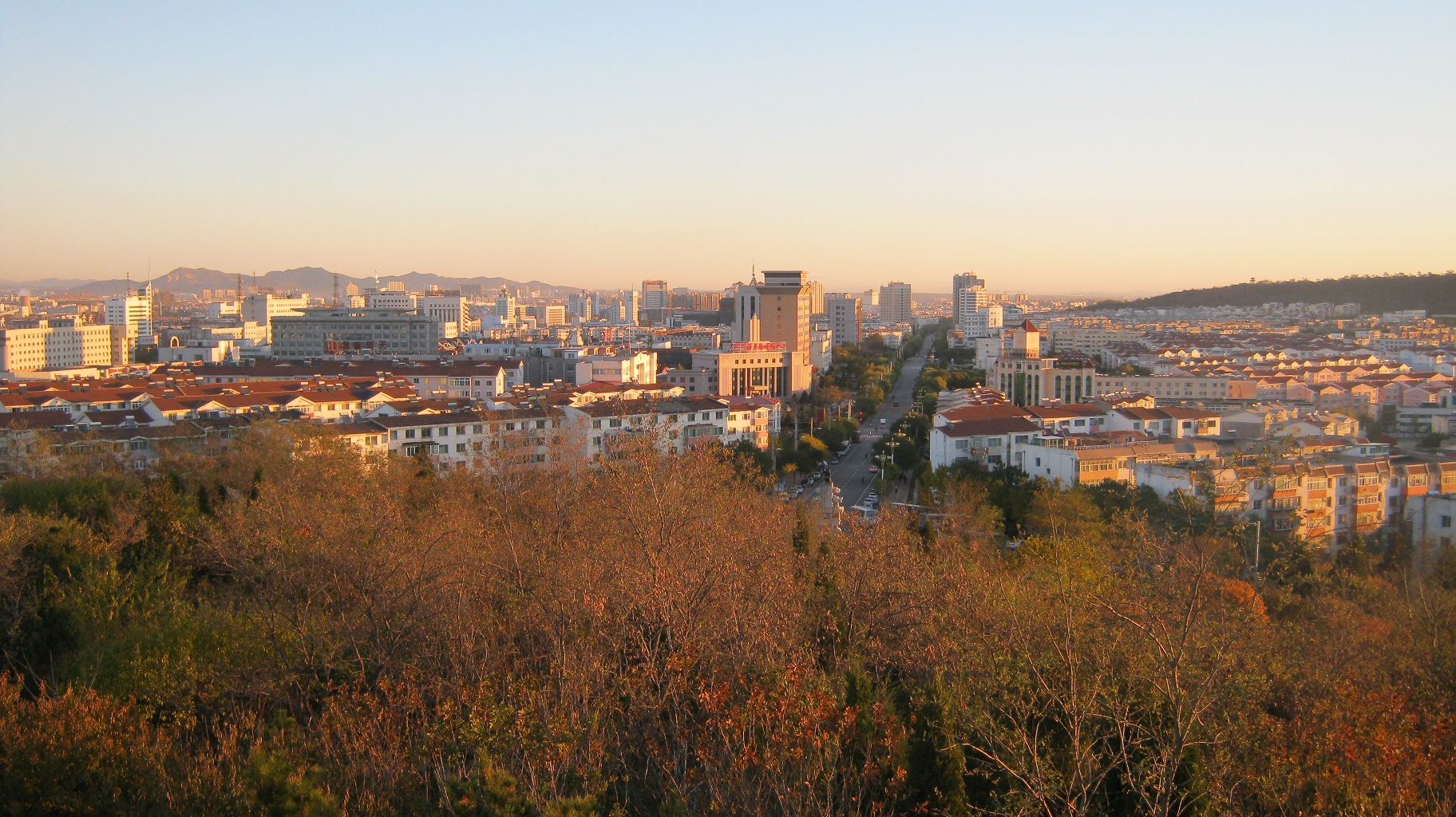
- The new district of Huludao

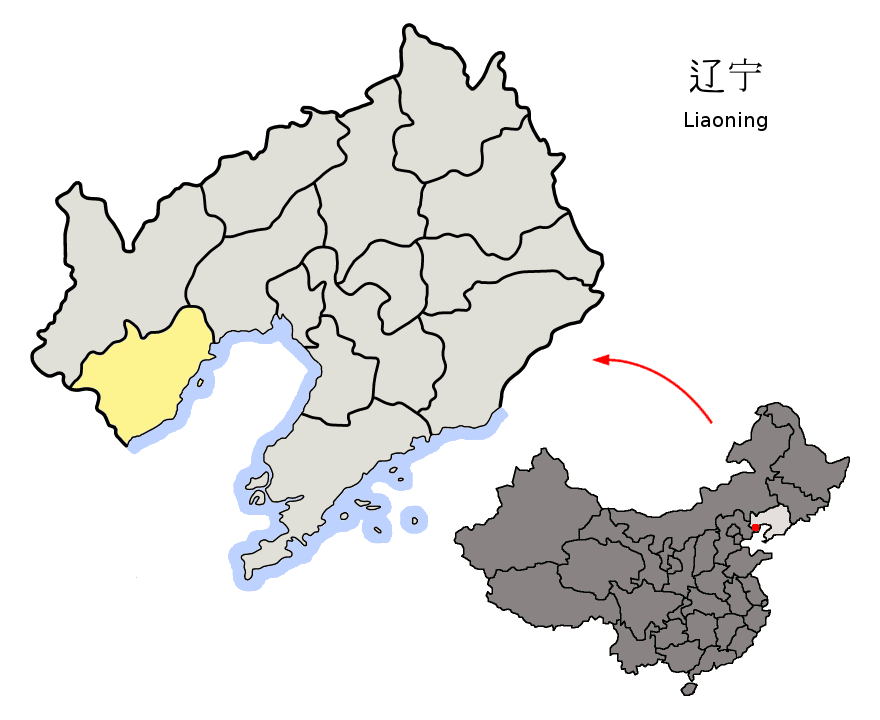
- Location of Huludao City jurisdiction in Liaoning

- Location of the city centre in Liaoning
- Coordinates (Huludao municipal government): 40°42′40″N 120°50′13″E
- Country: People's Republic of China
- Province: Liaoning
- Municipal seat: Longgang District
- Districts and Counties: List: Longgang District; Lianshan District; Nanpiao District; Xingcheng City; Suizhong County; Jianchang County

Government
  - CPC Party Secretary: Chen Xiaokun
  - Mayor: Liu Tengfei

Area
  - Prefecture-level city: 10,582 km^{2} (4,086 sq mi)
  - Urban: 2,365.7 km^{2} (913.4 sq mi)

Population (2020 census)
  - Prefecture-level city: 2,434,194
  - Density: 230.03/km^{2} (595.78/sq mi)
  - Urban: 944,495
  - Urban density: 399.25/km^{2} (1,034.0/sq mi)
  - Metro: 1,252,660

GDP
  - Prefecture-level city: CN¥ 72 billion US$ 11.6 billion
  - Per capita: CN¥ 28,071; US$ 4,507
- Time zone: UTC+8 (China Standard)
- Postal code: 125000
- Area code: 429
- ISO 3166 code: CN-LN-14
- Licence plates: 辽P
- Administrative division code: 211400
- Website: www.hld.gov.cn

Huludao (Chinese: 葫芦岛; pinyin: Húludǎo), formerly known as Jinxi (锦西) until 1994, is a coastal prefecture-level city in southwestern Liaoning province, People's Republic of China. Its name literally means "Gourd Island", referring to the fiddle-shaped contour of the peninsula ("half-island" in Chinese), which resembles a bottle gourd, at the city's Longgang District. It has a total area of 10,582 km^{2} (4,086 sq mi) and as of the 2020 census a population of 2,434,194 of whom 1,252,660 inhabitants lived in the built-up (or metro) area made of the 2 urban districts and Xingcheng City largely being conurbated.

Located on the northwestern shore of the Liaodong Bay, Huludao is one of the three principal cities (along with Jinzhou and Hebei province's Qinhuangdao) in the Liaoxi Corridor, and is Northeast China's gateway through the Shanhai Pass into North China. It borders Jinzhou to the northeast, Chaoyang to the north, and Qinhuangdao to the southwest, as well as sharing maritime boundaries with Yingkou and Dalian to the east and southeast across the bay.

== History ==
The area occupied by Huludao city has been settled by the Chinese since ancient times. Archeological evidence indicates that during the Shang and Zhou dynasties, the region enjoyed advanced Bronze Age technology, while urban civilization first developed during the Warring States era.

The Ming dynasty saw the construction of the Liaoning section of the Great Wall through Huludao. During this time the town of Xingcheng was fortified with a defensive wall which still stands today.

In 1906, the county of Jinxi was established. It became an important center for resistance during the Japanese invasion. During 1945–1948, it was a battleground between the Kuomintang and Chinese Communist forces, and over one million Japanese prisoners of war were repatriated from its port.

Jinxi county was granted city status in 1982 under the jurisdiction of Jinzhou, before becoming a prefecture-level city in 1989. The city was renamed Huludao, originally the name of the peninsula and port in the city area, in 1994.

== Geography ==
Huludao is a coastal city on the Bohai Sea at 120°38' east longitude and 40°56' north latitude. It lies in the southwest of Liaoning, at the border with Hebei, forming the Bohai Sea economic rim with such cities as Dalian, Yingkou, Qinhuangdao, and Qingdao. As the first city outside the Shanhai Pass, it serves as the gateway into Northeast China.

=== Climate ===
Huludao is in the north temperate zone with a continental monsoon climate that brings cold dry winters and hot humid summers. Annual precipitation averages between 550 and 650 millimetres (22 and 26 in) while the year round mean temperature is 8.5 to 9.5 °C (47.3 to 49.1 °F).

Climate data for Huludao (Lianshan District), elevation 39 m (128 ft), 1991–2020 normals, extremes 1981–2025)
Month	Jan	Feb	Mar	Apr	May	Jun	Jul	Aug	Sep	Oct	Nov	Dec	Year
Record high °C (°F)	11.4 (52.5)	17.5 (63.5)	29.0 (84.2)	33.7 (92.7)	38.9 (102.0)	39.7 (103.5)	37.7 (99.9)	37.3 (99.1)	35.6 (96.1)	30.3 (86.5)	23.3 (73.9)	14.4 (57.9)	39.7 (103.5)
Mean daily maximum °C (°F)	−1.3 (29.7)	2.4 (36.3)	8.9 (48.0)	16.9 (62.4)	23.2 (73.8)	26.4 (79.5)	28.8 (83.8)	28.9 (84.0)	25.3 (77.5)	18.0 (64.4)	8.2 (46.8)	0.9 (33.6)	15.6 (60.0)
Daily mean °C (°F)	−7.4 (18.7)	−3.6 (25.5)	3.1 (37.6)	11.1 (52.0)	17.7 (63.9)	21.7 (71.1)	24.8 (76.6)	24.3 (75.7)	19.4 (66.9)	11.9 (53.4)	2.5 (36.5)	−4.9 (23.2)	10.0 (50.1)
Mean daily minimum °C (°F)	−12.6 (9.3)	−8.7 (16.3)	−2.1 (28.2)	5.7 (42.3)	12.3 (54.1)	17.4 (63.3)	21.2 (70.2)	20.1 (68.2)	13.9 (57.0)	6.1 (43.0)	−2.6 (27.3)	−9.8 (14.4)	5.1 (41.1)
Record low °C (°F)	−26.7 (−16.1)	−22.3 (−8.1)	−14.1 (6.6)	−5.9 (21.4)	3.0 (37.4)	8.1 (46.6)	13.4 (56.1)	10.3 (50.5)	0.7 (33.3)	−6.5 (20.3)	−15.7 (3.7)	−23.3 (−9.9)	−26.7 (−16.1)
Average precipitation mm (inches)	2.6 (0.10)	3.4 (0.13)	8.4 (0.33)	25.1 (0.99)	50.2 (1.98)	88.1 (3.47)	140.5 (5.53)	138.8 (5.46)	48.5 (1.91)	33.6 (1.32)	15.1 (0.59)	3.3 (0.13)	557.6 (21.94)
Average precipitation days (≥ 0.1 mm)	1.6	1.7	2.5	4.6	7.4	11.1	10.6	9.0	6.0	5.0	3.2	1.8	64.5
Average snowy days	2.5	2.1	2.0	0.6	0	0	0	0	0	0.2	2.4	2.4	12.2
Average relative humidity (%)	52	51	48	50	57	72	81	79	70	61	55	53	61
Mean monthly sunshine hours	196.9	198.5	235.9	237.9	260.3	216.1	188.9	211.4	224.6	217.7	184.7	187.6	2,560.5
Percentage possible sunshine	66	65	63	59	58	48	42	50	61	64	63	66	59
Source: China Meteorological Administration

== Administrative divisions ==
Huludao has six immediate sub-municipal divisions:

Map
#	Name	Chinese	Hanyu Pinyin	Population (2020 census)	Area (km^{2})	Density 2020 (/km^{2})
1	Longgang District	龙港区	Lónggǎng Qū	284,250	190	1,551
2	Lianshan District	连山区	Liánshān Qū	468,110	1,173	399
3	Nanpiao District	南票区	Nánpiào Qū	182,135	1,003	182
4	Xingcheng City	兴城市	Xīngchéng Shì	490,300	2,135	230
5	Suizhong County	绥中县	Suízhōng Xiàn	545,963	2,906	188
6	Jianchang County	建昌县	Jiànchāng Xiàn	453,436	3,175	143

== Economy ==
More than 40 mineral resources have been discovered in the Huludao region, including gold, zinc, molybdenum, lime and manganese. As a result, major pollution has been an ongoing issue for Huludao's local residents. West of the city center, the town of Yangjiazhangzi is an important global center for molybdenum mining.

Huludao boasts a long coastline of 237 km, and the surrounding waters are rich in fish, shrimp and shellfish, with plentiful reserves of natural gas and oil. With a climate suitable for the cultivation of fruit trees, Suizhong county is home to the Qiansuo orchard, Asia's largest, which grows a wide variety of fruits including apples, pears, nectarines and jujubes.

Huludao's economy is dominated by some of China's most important industrial enterprises, providing employment for a large proportion of the population. These include Asia's biggest zinc manufacturing operation, the Huludao Zinc Smelter, the Jinxi oil refinery and Jinhua chemical engineering, as well as Huludao's massive Bohai Shipyard, the building site for all of China's nuclear submarines. The oilfield off the coast of Suizhong county produces 5 million tons of crude oil annually. Electricity generation is set to increase annual capacity to 3.6 million kilowatts.

In the city itself are special development areas designed to attract foreign investment to the region, including the Huludao Economic Development Zone and the Huludao Hi-tech Development zone, which is the location for a Siemens turbomachinery plant.

== Transport ==
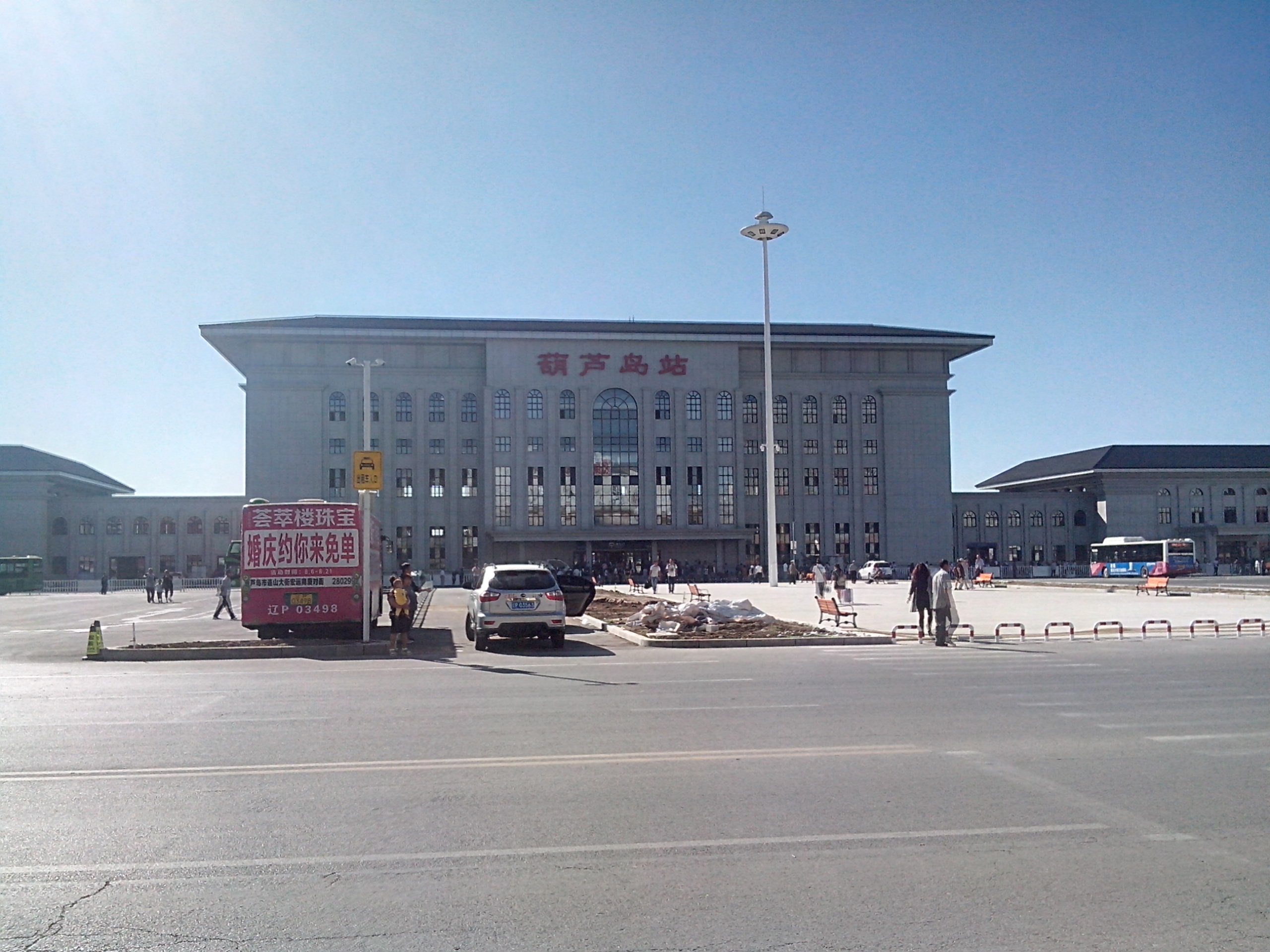
Huludao Railway Station

Huludao is an important link in rail and road networks between Beijing and northern cities such as Shenyang and Harbin. The newly renovated North Station (葫芦岛北站) serves high-speed passenger trains that cover the 300 km (190 mi) to Beijing in about three hours.

Public transportation in the city is provided by over 25 bus services and innumerable taxis. Traditional cycle rickshaw and auto rickshaws were banned from the city in 2010 but can be seen in smaller cities and towns in the region. Long-distance buses and trains link the centers in the greater Huludao region.

== Tourism ==
Huludao is endowed with scenic areas and sites of historical interest. It attracts many domestic tourists in summer with its picturesque sandy beaches, including Longwan Beach near the city center and Xingcheng Beach, a traditional resort known as the 'second Beidaihe'.

Xingcheng’s old town preserves its Ming-dynasty city walls and contains temples and other historic architecture. The Xingcheng area also has hot springs and beaches, and Juehua Island is a tourist attraction.

The Great Wall passes through Huludao in spectacular fashion at Jiumenkou on the Hebei border, where the wall spans the Daqing river in nine gates. It is the only section of the Great Wall to be built over water and was listed as a World Heritage site in 2002.

Other attractions in the area include the remains of Jieshi palace, built by the first emperor of the Qin dynasty over 2,000 years ago.

== Education ==
Tertiary institutions of importance in Huludao include:

- Liaoning Technical University
- Liaoning Finance and Trade College
- Bohai Shipbuilding Vocational College
- Huludao No.1 High School

== Sister cities ==
- Las Vegas, United States
- Miyazaki, Japan
