= Xingcheng =

Xingcheng 兴城市 Hingcheng; Hsingcheng
- County-level city

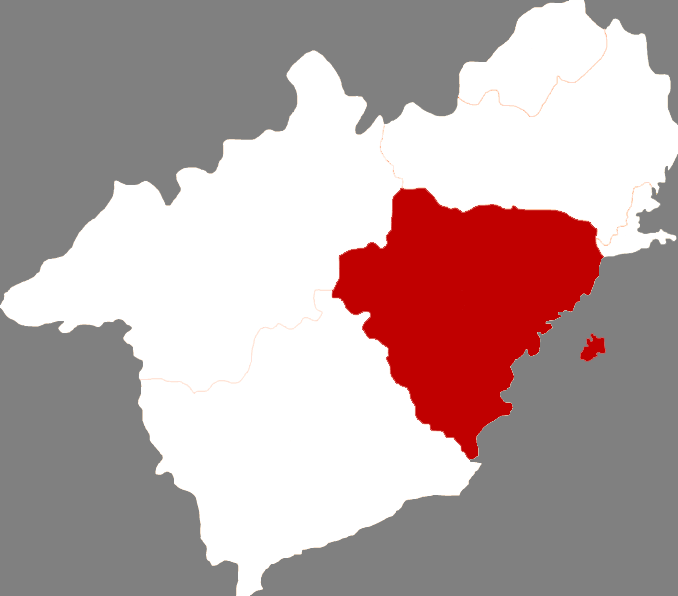
- Location in Huludao City

- Location in Liaoning
- Coordinates (city): 40°37′N 120°44′E
- Country: People's Republic of China
- Province: Liaoning
- Prefecture-level city: Huludao

Area
  - County-level city: 2,113 km^{2} (816 sq mi)
  - Urban: 268.50 km^{2} (103.67 sq mi)
- Elevation: 8 m (26 ft)

Population (2020 census)
  - County-level city: 552,180
  - Density: 261.3/km^{2} (676.8/sq mi)
  - Urban: 219,545
- Time zone: UTC+8 (China Standard)
- Postal code: 1125xx
- Website: web.archive.org/web/20080723211053/http://www.xc-online.gov.cn/

Xingcheng (simplified Chinese: 兴城; traditional Chinese: 興城; pinyin: Xīngchéng), former name Ningyuan (宁远), is a county-level city under the administration of Huludao, in southwest Liaoning province, China, with a population of approximately 220,000 urban inhabitants, and is located on the Liaodong Bay, i.e. the northern coast of the Bohai Sea. The area is steeped in history, and contains one of the best preserved Ming dynasty towns in China, as well as functioning as a laidback summer resort.

== Historical Importance ==
Xingcheng has a long and distinguished history, and was established as a county as far back as the Liao dynasty in CE 990. After being dissolved by the Yuan, it was resurrected during the Ming dynasty under the name Ningyuan, and gained strategic importance as the first defensive outpost outside the Great Wall. Xingcheng's city walls have stood since they were first constructed in 1428 and were instrumental in helping the Ming defeat the great Manchu commander Nurhaci at the pivotal Battle of Ningyuan in 1626.

== Tourist Destination ==
In modern times Xingcheng has become a mecca for those seeking relief from the bustling heat of summer in the overcrowded cities of Northern China. The town has attractive swimming beaches and is also blessed with natural hot springs, discovered during the Tang dynasty. For this reason, a number of spa resorts and sanatoriums have sprung up and the town has been marketed as a health destination, and is frequented by groups of Party cadres on government sponsored training courses during the summer. Xingcheng is home to the largest island in the Bohai Gulf, the beautiful and secluded Juhua Island (simplified Chinese: 菊花岛; traditional Chinese: 菊花島; pinyin: Júhuā Dǎo; lit. 'Chrysanthemum Island'; 40°29′51″N 120°48′05″E), once a sanctuary for the Prince of Yan on the run from the ruthless Qin Shihuang. A boat provides access to the island from the passenger terminal at the wharf, where local fisherman dock.

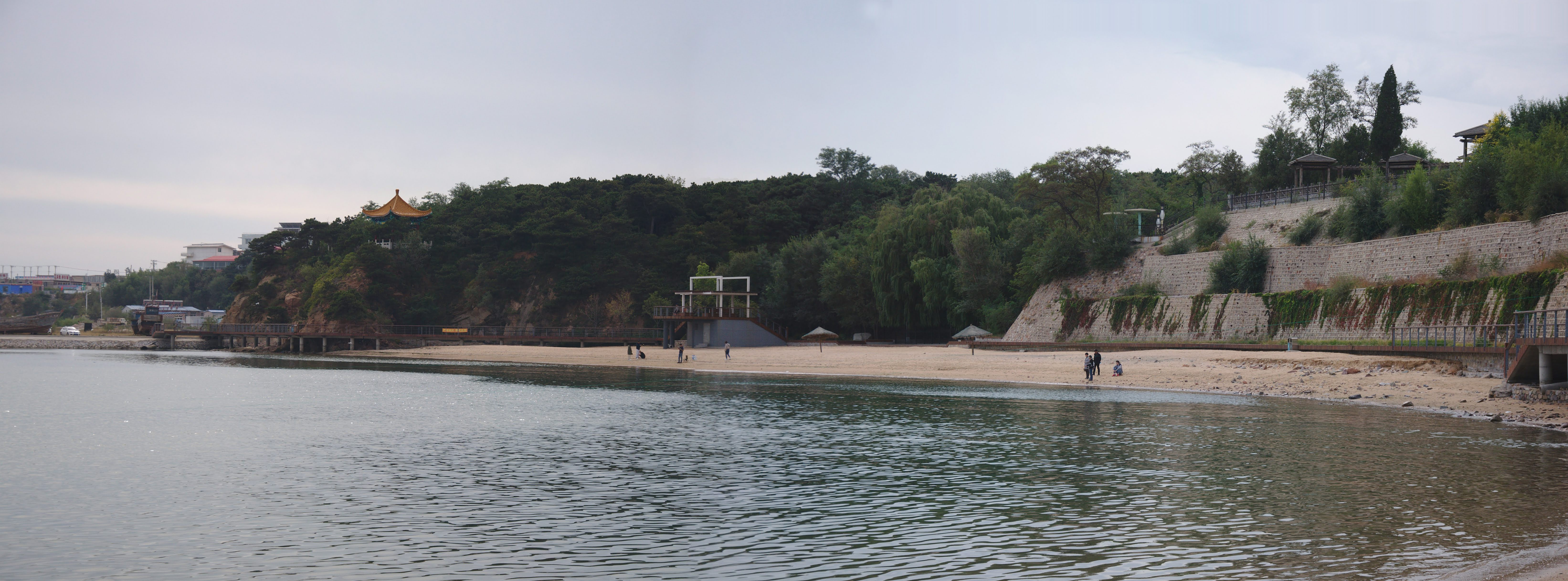
XingCheng Seaside View(兴城海滨风光)

The Xingcheng seaside draws quite a crowd for swimming and other water sports and recreational activities during the summer. Its entrance is marked by a large statue of a local goddess. A pier connecting reef-top pavilions and a temple are located at the south end of the beach.

Liaoning Finance and Trade College in Xingcheng hosted events for the city's first International Swimsuit Festival on August 16, 2011. This event follows the city's receipt of the honorary title “Chinese Swimwear Town” by the China National Textile & Apparel Council and China Garment Association in 2010 for the city's noteworthy swimsuit manufacture.

The old town of Xingcheng is the best preserved of four Ming dynasty cities in China that retain their original and complete city walls, and is a treasure trove of traditional Ming architecture, containing historical remnants such as the Confucius Temple, the oldest temple in Northeast China and the largest ancient building in Liaoning.

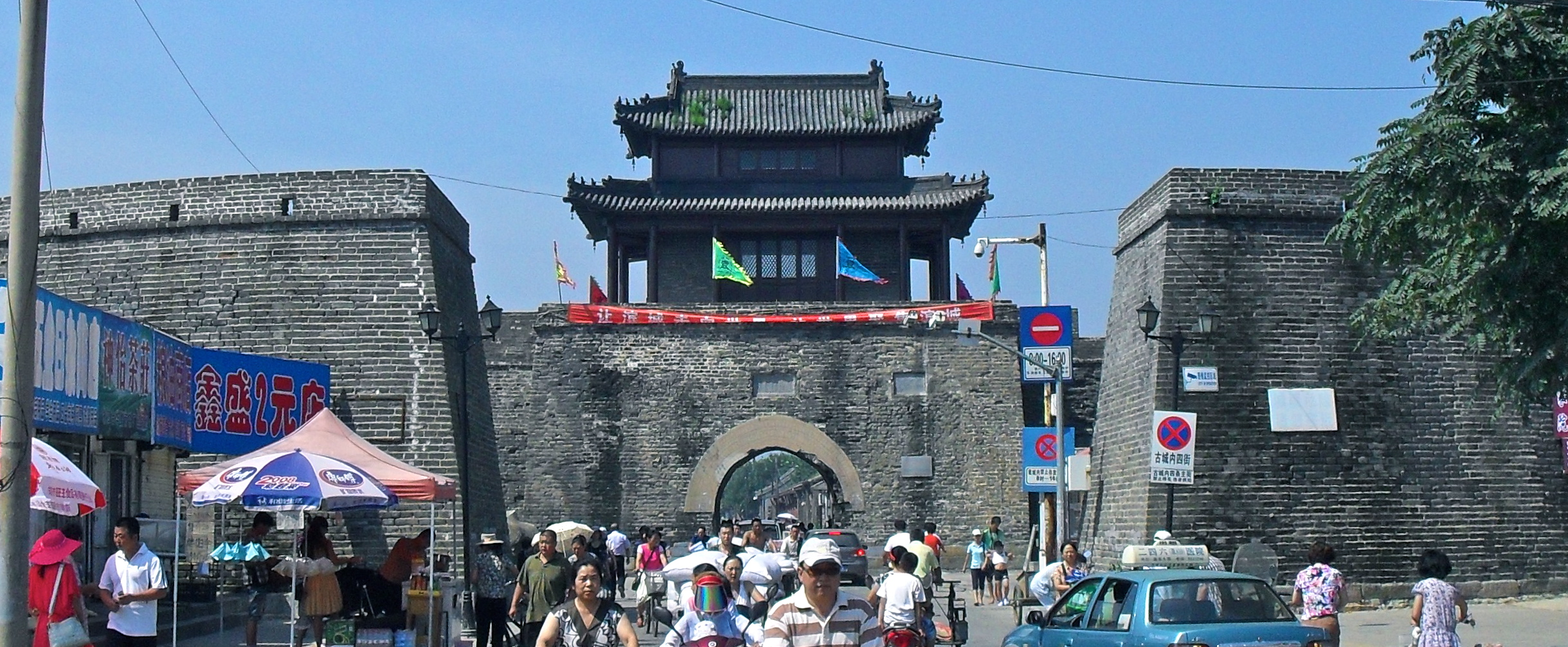
The east gate of the wall of the old town of Xingcheng.

Shoushan (首山), a mountain located in the east end of Xingcheng, is open to the public for recreation. Visitors can hike to its summit. The area around it features temples on adjacent hills.

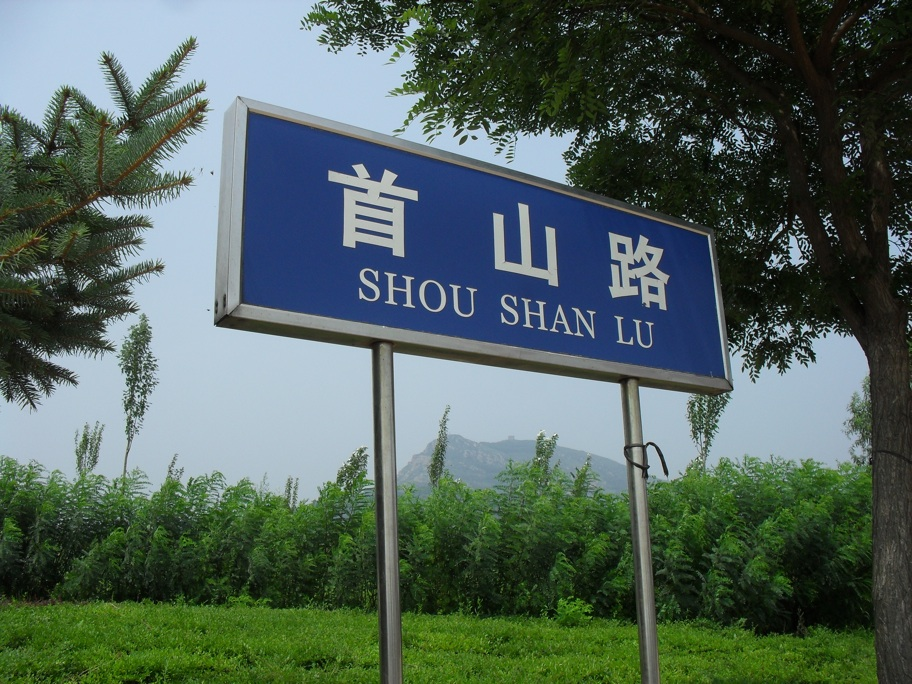
A Shou Shan Road (首山路) sign featuring the façade of Shoushan (首山) beyond the overgrowth in the background in Xingcheng.

== Transportation ==
Xingcheng is served by rail lines and bus routes that make it accessible from other larger cities. Huludao, a short taxi ride away, also features high-speed rail and other rail lines and additional bus routes.

Taxis are metered and are typically easy to hail with fares starting at 5 RMB.

The city also provides bus service about twelve hours a day for a fare of 1 RMB per passenger. Routes 1 and 2 connect the east end near the coast to the heart of the city's commercial activity in Nanguan (南关) in the old town and the rail and bus stations on the west end.

The closest airport is Jinzhou Airport.

== Administrative divisions ==
There are seven subdistricts, four towns, and two townships, and 15 ethnic townships under the city's administration.

Subdistricts:

- Gucheng Subdistrict (古城街道)
- Ningyuan Subdistrict (宁远街道)
- Diaoyutai Subdistrict (钓鱼台街道)
- Chengdong Subdistrict (城东街道)
- Wenquan Subdistrict (温泉街道)
- Sijiatun Subdistrict (四家屯街道)
- Huashan Subdistrict (华山街道)

Towns:

- Dongxinzhuang (东辛庄镇)
- Shahousuo (沙后所镇)
- Guojia (郭家镇)
- Caozhuang (曹庄镇)
- Xudapu (徐大堡镇)

Townships:

- Shuangshu Township (双树乡)
- Juhuadao Township (菊花岛乡)
- Dazhai Manchu Ethnic Township (大寨满族乡)
- Sandaogou Manchu Ethnic Township (三道沟满族乡)
- Yuantaizi Manchu Ethnic Township (元台子满族乡)
- Baita Manchu Ethnic Township (白塔满族乡)
- Jiumen Manchu Ethnic Township (旧门满族乡)
- Yang'an Manchu Ethnic Township (羊安满族乡)
- Liutaizi Manchu Ethnic Township (刘台子满族乡)
- Hongyazi Manchu Ethnic Township (红崖子满族乡)
- Nandashan Manchu Ethnic Township (南大山满族乡)
- Yaowang Manchu Ethnic Township (药王满族乡)
- Gaojialing Manchu Ethnic Township (高家岭满族乡)
- Wanghai Manchu Ethnic Township (望海满族乡)
- Jianchang Manchu Ethnic Township (碱厂满族乡)
- Weizhan Manchu Ethnic Township (围屏满族乡)

== Climate ==
Climate data for Xingcheng, elevation 21 m (69 ft), (1991–2020 normals, extremes 1981–2025)
Month	Jan	Feb	Mar	Apr	May	Jun	Jul	Aug	Sep	Oct	Nov	Dec	Year
Record high °C (°F)	10.4 (50.7)	13.2 (55.8)	28.9 (84.0)	33.5 (92.3)	36.9 (98.4)	39.9 (103.8)	37.5 (99.5)	34.7 (94.5)	33.9 (93.0)	28.7 (83.7)	21.0 (69.8)	14.5 (58.1)	39.9 (103.8)
Mean daily maximum °C (°F)	−1.3 (29.7)	2.1 (35.8)	8.4 (47.1)	16.1 (61.0)	22.6 (72.7)	25.6 (78.1)	28.0 (82.4)	28.3 (82.9)	24.9 (76.8)	17.9 (64.2)	8.2 (46.8)	1.1 (34.0)	15.2 (59.3)
Daily mean °C (°F)	−7.6 (18.3)	−3.9 (25.0)	2.6 (36.7)	10.5 (50.9)	17.1 (62.8)	21.3 (70.3)	24.3 (75.7)	24.0 (75.2)	19.1 (66.4)	11.6 (52.9)	2.3 (36.1)	−5.0 (23.0)	9.7 (49.4)
Mean daily minimum °C (°F)	−12.7 (9.1)	−9.1 (15.6)	−2.6 (27.3)	4.9 (40.8)	11.7 (53.1)	17.1 (62.8)	20.9 (69.6)	20.0 (68.0)	13.7 (56.7)	5.7 (42.3)	−2.7 (27.1)	−9.8 (14.4)	4.8 (40.6)
Record low °C (°F)	−27.5 (−17.5)	−20.7 (−5.3)	−14.4 (6.1)	−7.3 (18.9)	2.3 (36.1)	5.5 (41.9)	14.2 (57.6)	11.2 (52.2)	0.1 (32.2)	−6.1 (21.0)	−16.2 (2.8)	−22.0 (−7.6)	−27.5 (−17.5)
Average precipitation mm (inches)	2.2 (0.09)	2.7 (0.11)	7.2 (0.28)	23.6 (0.93)	49.6 (1.95)	82.6 (3.25)	151.8 (5.98)	138.7 (5.46)	43.8 (1.72)	29.7 (1.17)	12.3 (0.48)	2.7 (0.11)	546.9 (21.53)
Average precipitation days (≥ 0.1 mm)	1.5	1.5	2.5	4.2	6.6	9.7	10.3	8.6	5.3	4.4	2.9	1.5	59
Average snowy days	2.3	1.9	1.7	0.5	0	0	0	0	0	0.2	1.9	2.1	10.6
Average relative humidity (%)	54	54	52	54	60	75	84	82	73	64	58	55	64
Mean monthly sunshine hours	220.8	219.9	264.3	261.2	281.4	240.7	206.6	235.3	250.5	235.1	199.1	205.2	2,820.1
Percentage possible sunshine	74	73	71	65	63	54	46	56	68	69	68	71	65
Source: China Meteorological Administration

== See also ==
- Battle of Ningyuan
- Liaoning Finance and Trade College
