= Family tree of Chinese monarchs (1279–1912) =

Chinese imperial pedigree from the Yuan to the Qing dynasties

This is a family tree of Chinese monarchs from the Yuan dynasty to the end of the Qing dynasty.

Family trees of Chinese monarchs
- (ancient)
- (Spring and Autumn period)
- (Warring States period)
- (early)
- (middle)
- (late)

== Yuan dynasty and Northern Yuan ==
The following is the Yuan dynasty family tree. Genghis Khan founded the Mongol Empire in 1206. The empire became split beginning with the succession war of his grandsons Kublai Khan and Ariq Boke. Kublai Khan, after defeating his younger brother Ariq Boke, founded the Yuan dynasty of China in 1271. The dynasty was overthrown by the Ming dynasty during the reign of Toghun Temür in 1368, but it survived in the Mongolian Plateau, known as the Northern Yuan; years of reign over the Northern Yuan (up to 1388) are given in brackets.

Long before Kublai Khan announced the dynastic name "Great Yuan" in 1271, Khagans (Great Khans) of the Mongol State (Yeke Mongγol Ulus) already started to use the Chinese title of Emperor (Chinese: 皇帝; pinyin: Huángdì) practically in the Chinese language since Spring 1206 in the First Year of the reign of Genghis Khan (as 成吉思皇帝; 'Genghis Emperor'). However, The Mongol Khagans-Emperors and regents before Kublai Khan were only declared Yuan emperors after the creation of Yuan dynasty in 1271.

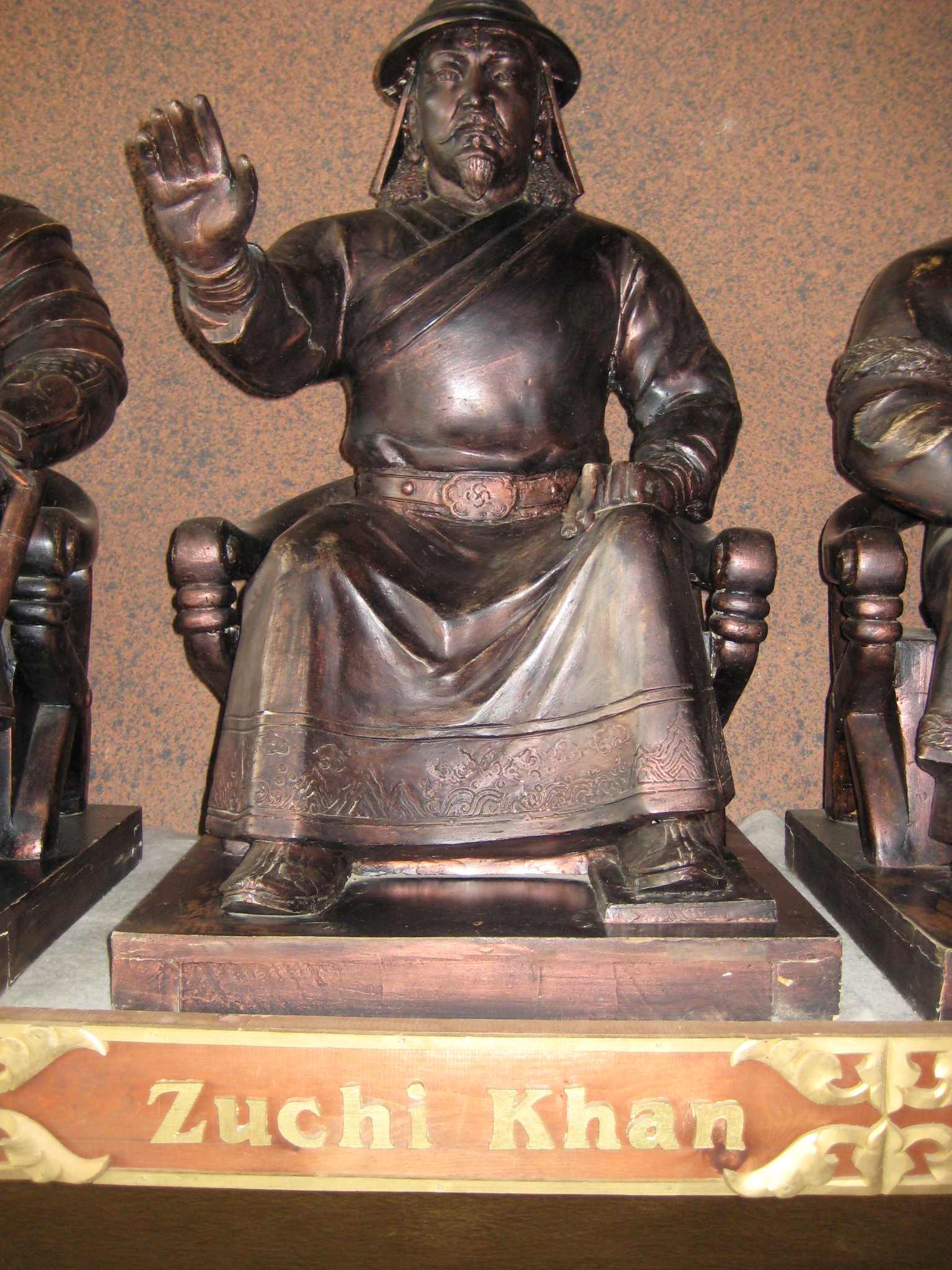
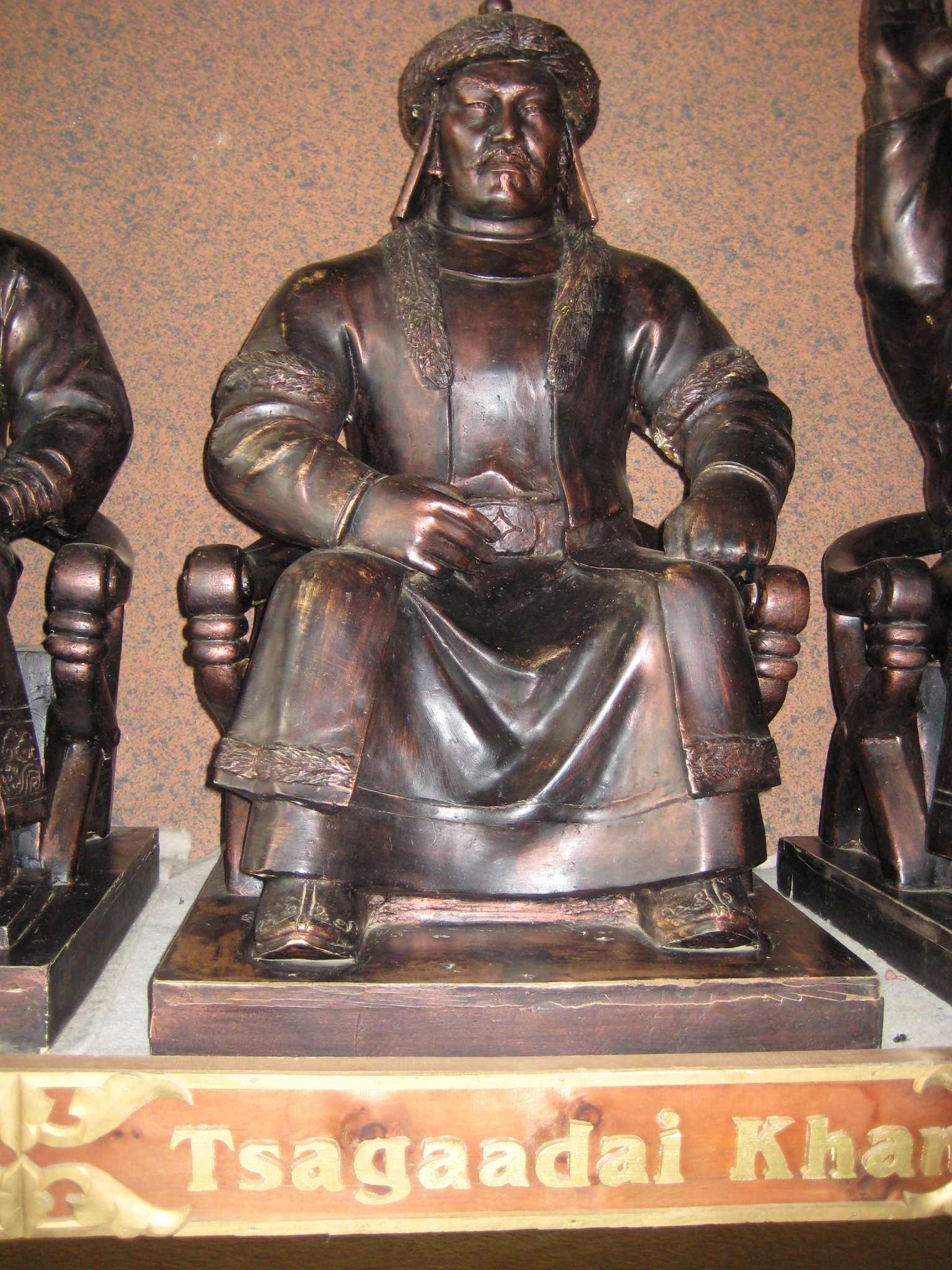
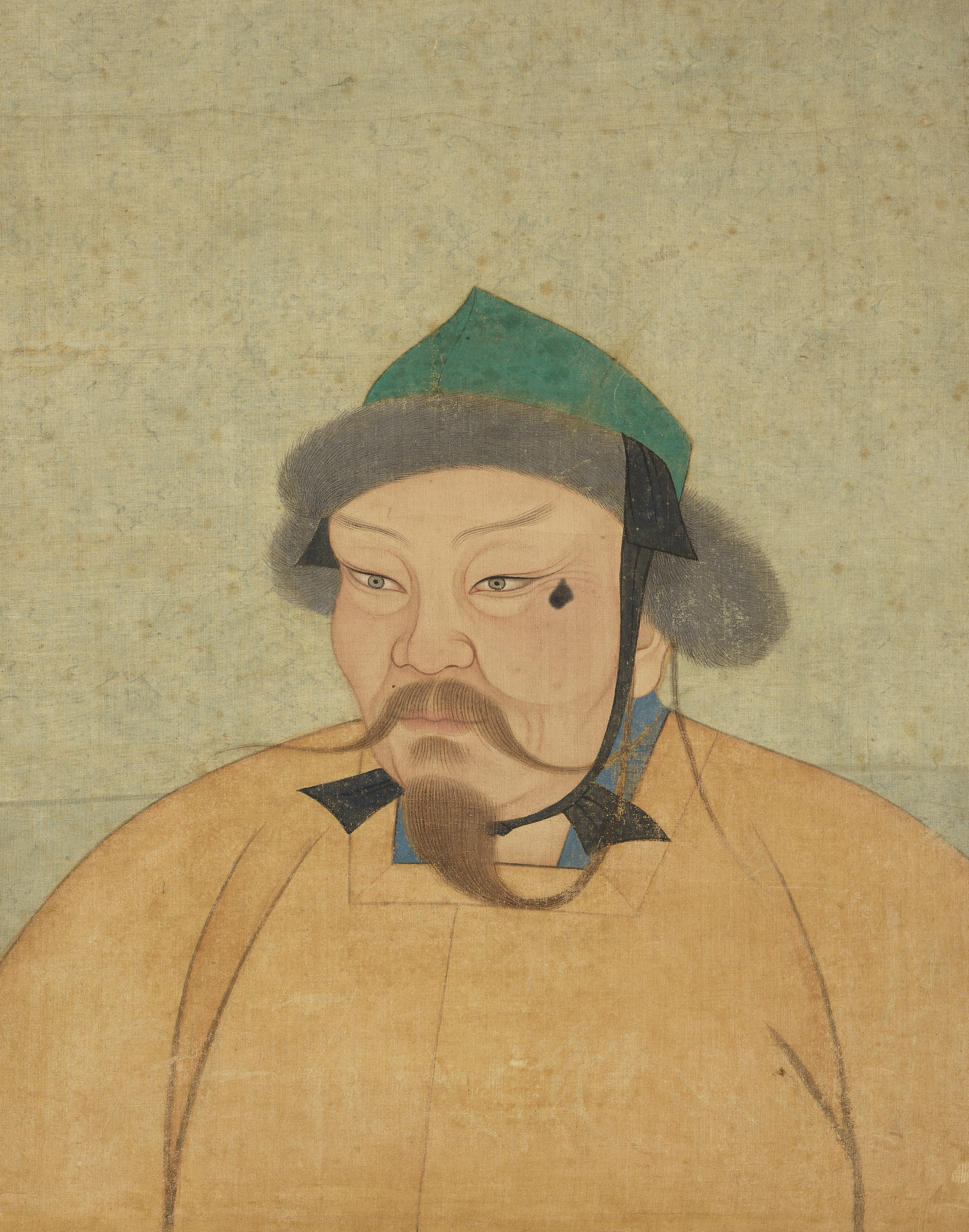
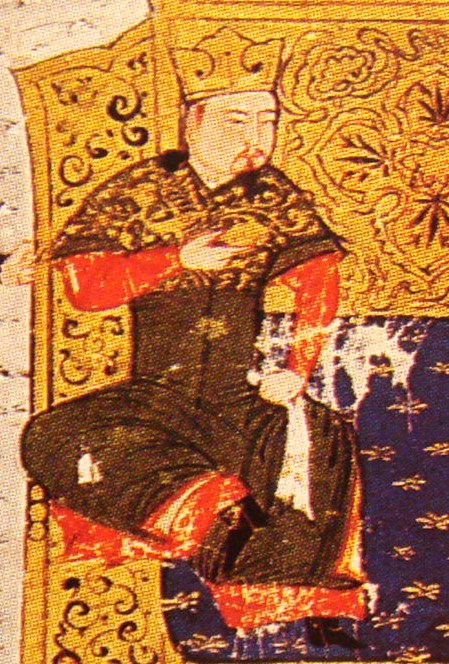
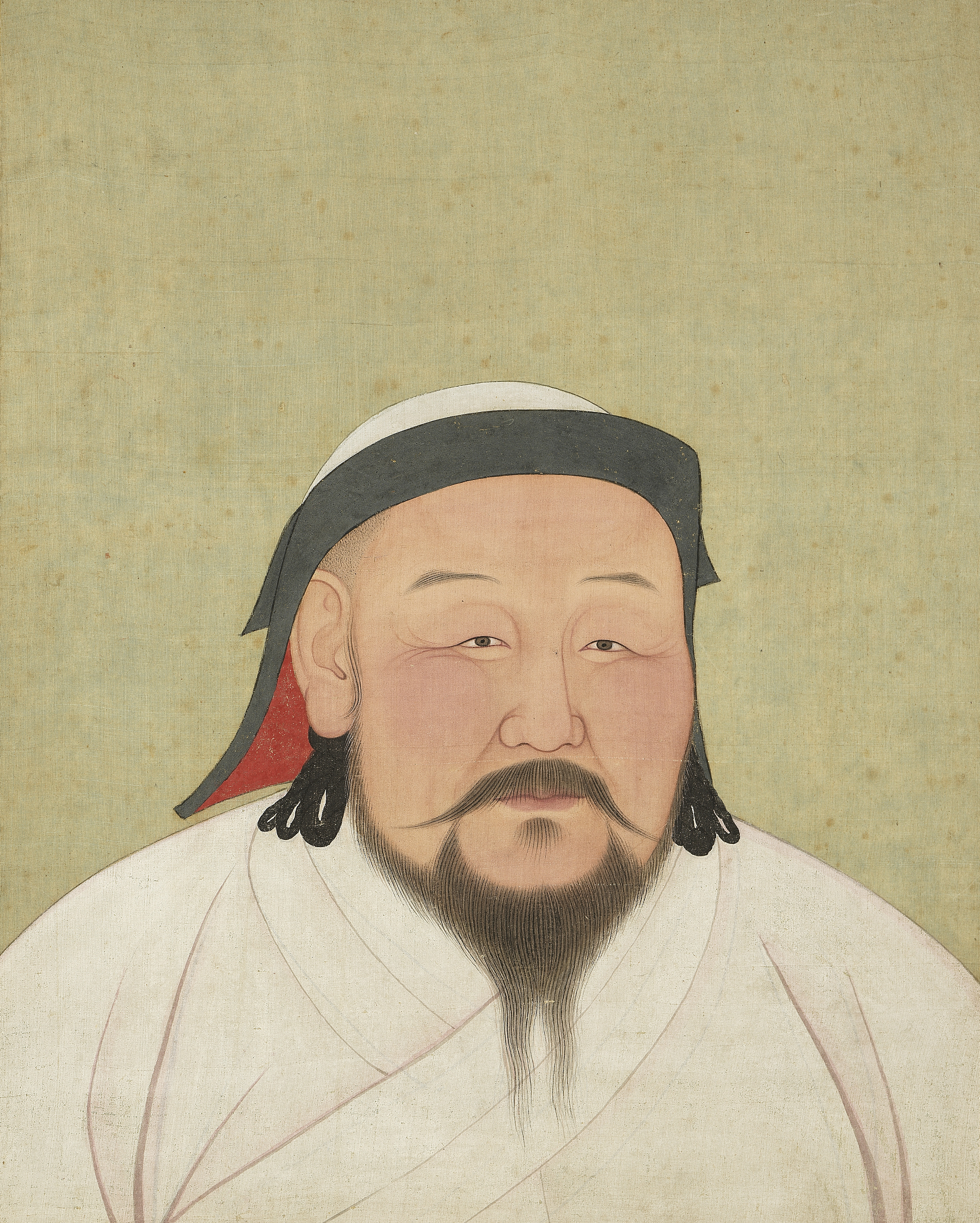
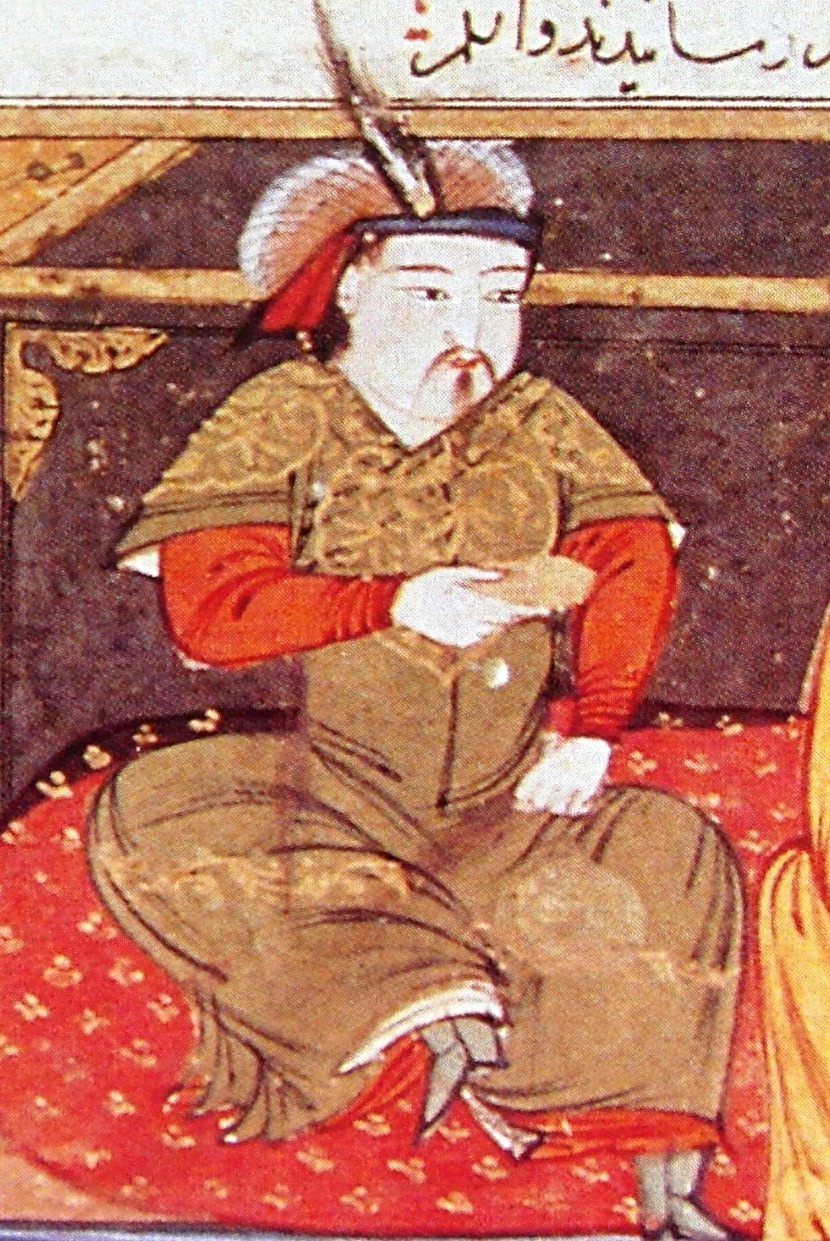
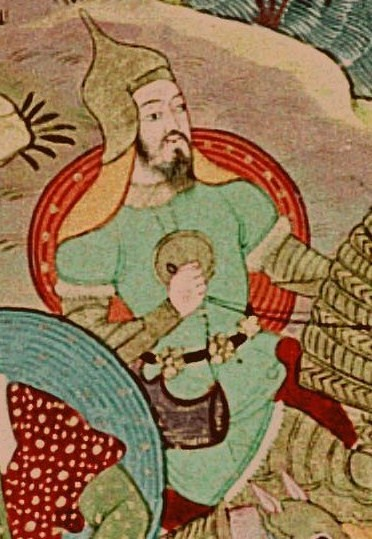
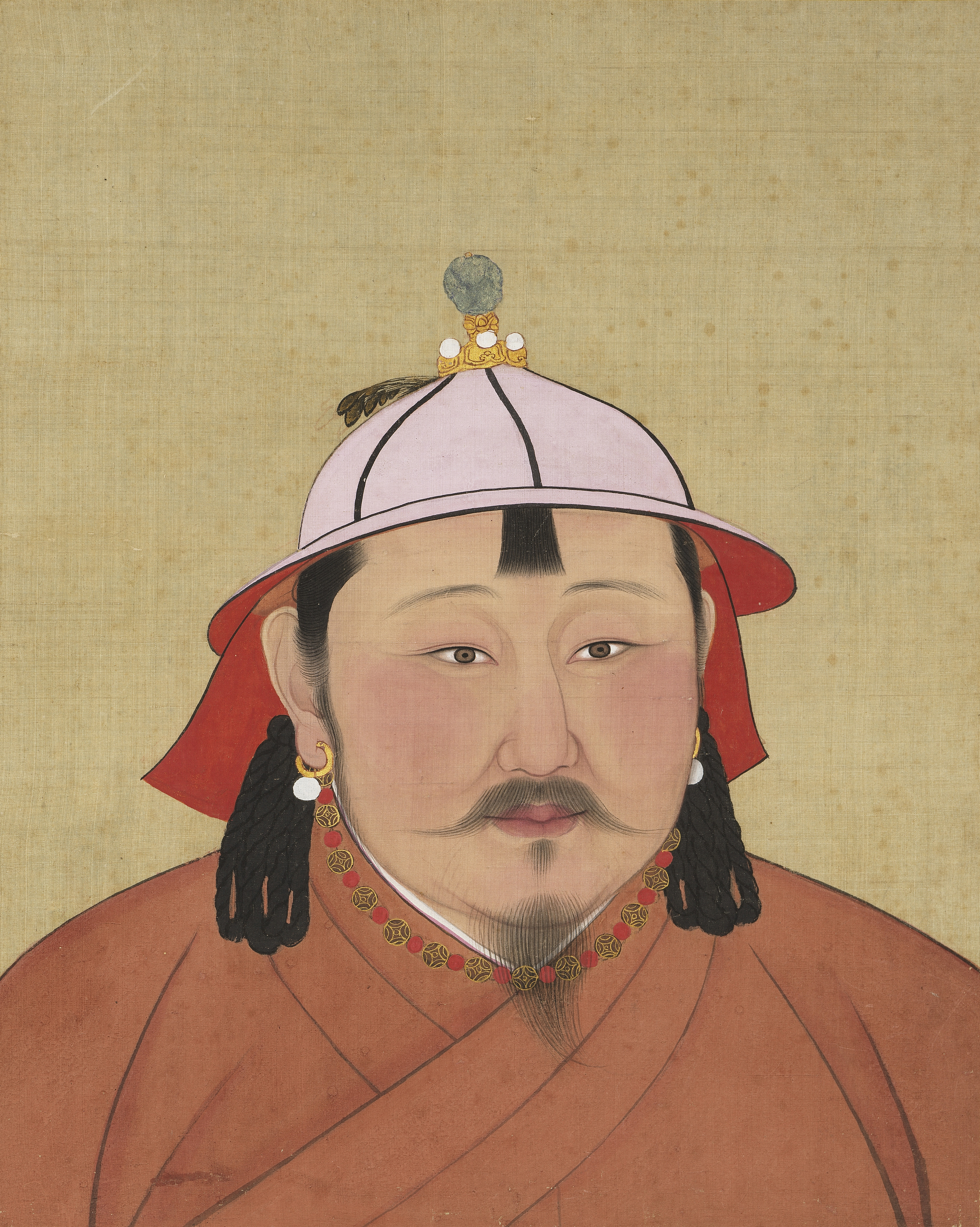
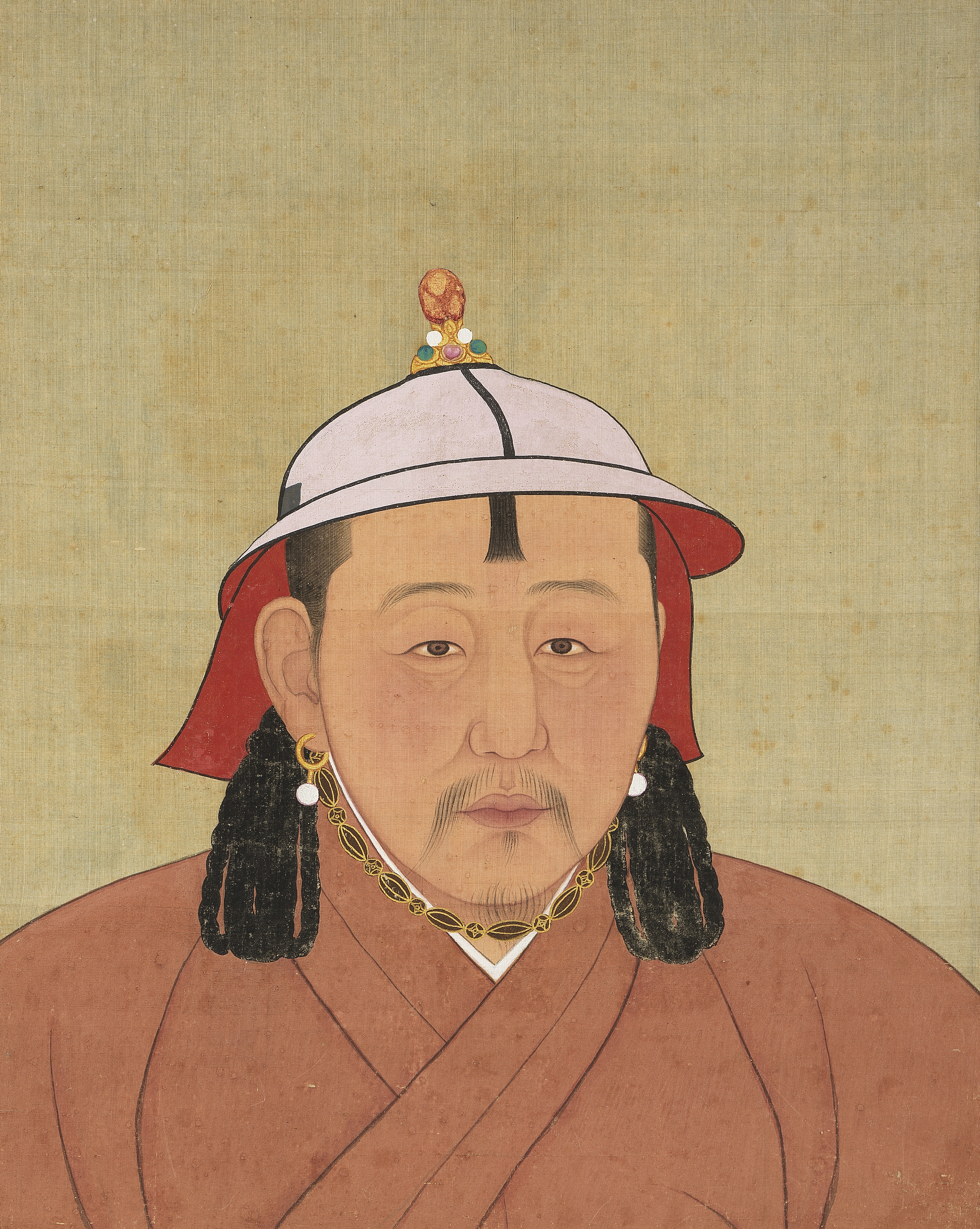
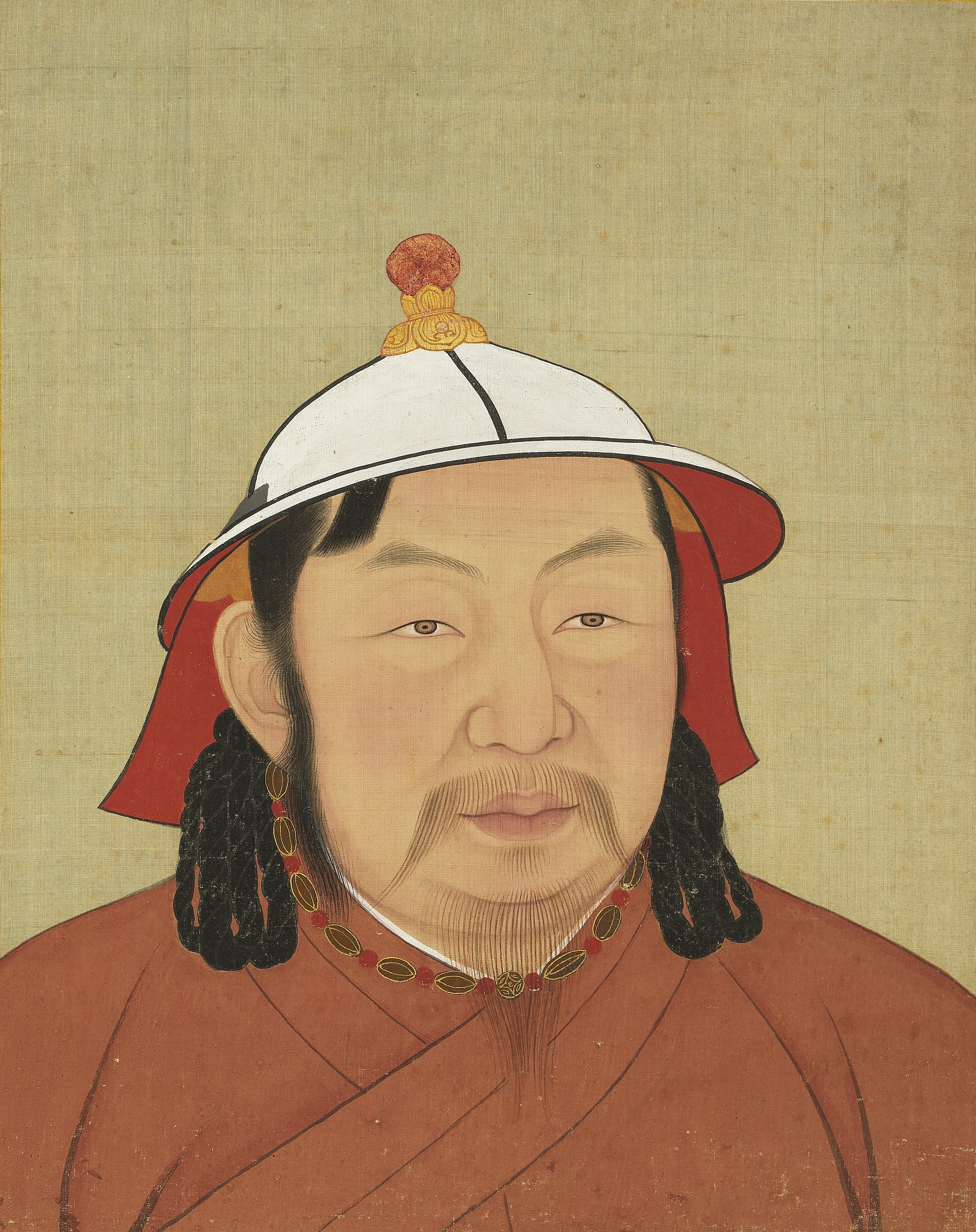
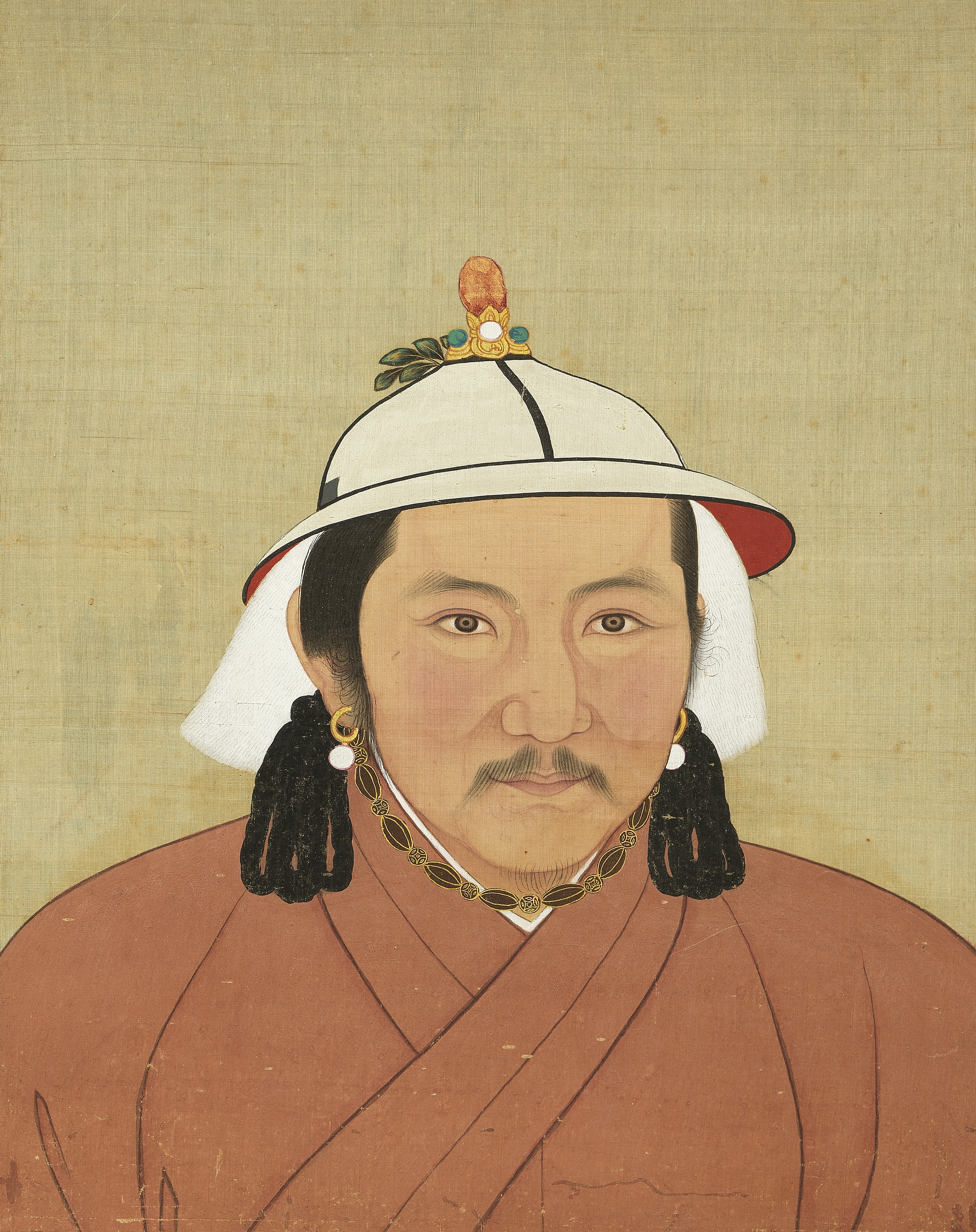
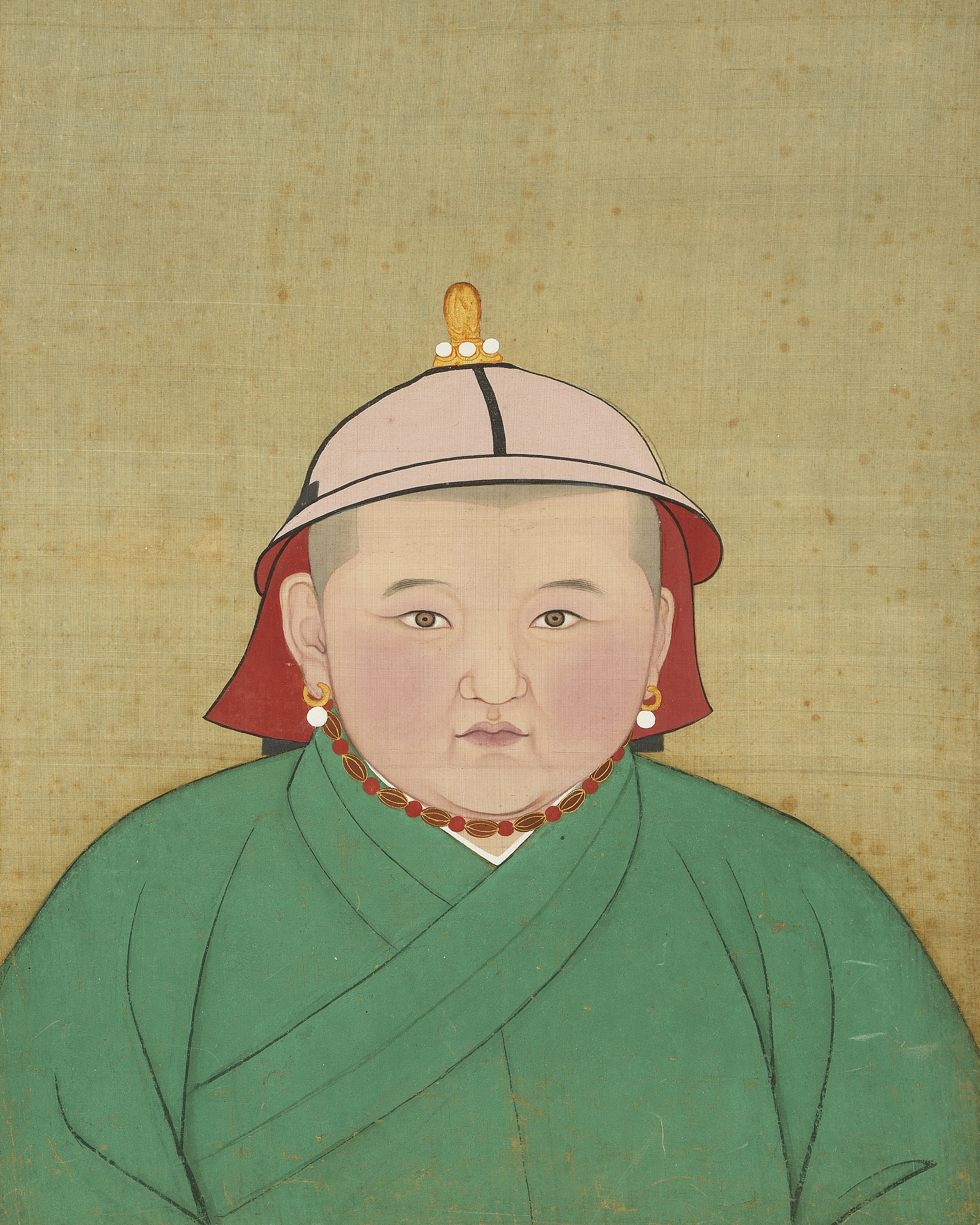
Yesükhei Baghatur
1	2	3 (1)	4 (2)	5 (3)	6 (4)
Belgutei	Bekhter	Temujin; Genghis Khan; ~1162–1227 Taizu 太祖; Khagan: r. 1206–1227	Hasar	Hachiun	Temüge; 1168–1246
1	2	3	4
Jochi c. 1181–1227	Chagatai 1183–1242	Ögedei Khan; ~1186–1241 Taizong 太宗; Khagan: r. 1229–1241	Töregene; Great Khatun1242–1246	Tolui; ~1190–1232 Ruizong 睿宗 (Khagan: r. 1227–1229)
1	1	2	3	4
Oghul Qaimish d. 1251; Khagan: r. 1248–1251	Güyük Khan; ~1206–1248 Dingzong 定宗; Khagan: r. 1246–1248	Möngke Khan; ~1208–1259 Xianzong 憲宗; Khagan: r. 1251–1259	Kublai Khan; 1215–1294 Khagan: r. 1260–1271; Shizu 世祖 r. 1271–1294	Hulagu; ~1217–1265 Ilkhan 1256–1265	Ariq Böke d. 1266 Khagan: r. 1259–1264
2
Zhenjin 真金; 1243–1286; Yuzong 裕宗
1	2	3
Gammala; 1263–1302; Xianzong 顯宗	Darmabala; 1264–1292; Shunzong 順宗	Temür; Öljeytü Khan; 1265–1307 Chengzong 成宗 r. 1294–1307
1	1	2
Yesün Temür Khan; 1293–1328 Taiding 泰定 r. 1323–1328	Kayishan; Külüg Khan; 1281–1311 Wuzong 武宗 r. 1307–1311	Ayurbarwada; Buyantu Khan; 1285–1320 Renzong 仁宗 r. 1311–1320
1	1	2	1
Ragibagh Khan; ~1320–1328? Tianshun 天順 r. 1328	Kuśala; Khutughtu Khan; 1300–1329 Mingzong 明宗 r. 1329	Tugh Temür; Jayaatu Khan; 1304–1332 Wenzong 文宗 r. 1328–1329; 1329–1332	Shidibala; Gegeen Khan; 1303–1323 Yingzong 英宗 r. 1321–1323
1	2
Toghun Temür; Ukhaantu Khan; 1320–1370 Huizong 惠宗 r. 1333–1368 (–1370)	Rinchinbal Khan; 1326–1332 Ningzong 寧宗; 1332
Northern; Yuan
Ayushiridara; Biligtü Khan Zhaozong 昭宗 r. 1370–1378	Tögüs Temür; Uskhal Khan Yizong 益宗 r. 1378–1388

== Ming dynasty and Southern Ming ==
The following is a simplified family tree for the Ming dynasty, which ruled China between 1368 and 1644.

Those who became emperor are listed in bold, with their years of reign. In China, Ming emperors are best known by their temple names, which are given second below, after the personal name. (The Jianwen Emperor was not awarded a temple name: his posthumous name, Huidi (惠帝), is used instead.) The names given in bold are era names, the form by which Ming emperors are most commonly known in English, but which technically refer to the timespan of an emperor's reign rather than to the emperor himself. (Xingzong and Ruizong are temple names: they never actually ruled, but Xingzong was posthumously granted an emperor's title and Ruizong was raised posthumously to the status of emperor by his son, the Jiajing Emperor, in the Great Rites Controversy.) The imperial family's original family name was Zhu (朱), but the Hongwu Emperor adopted the dynastic name Ming (明) (as were all but one imperial Chinese dynasties), meaning "brilliant". The numbers here indicate the seniority in birth of an emperor's sons as the Ming Dynasty was the only Chinese dynasty to have the eldest surviving son succeed the throne in continuous fashion (though not for the Yongle, from whom all subsequent Ming emperors descend and Jingtai Emperors – both of whom usurped the throne; while the Jiajing – see above, and Chongzhen Emperors succeeded sonless brother), not unlike the Salic Law practised in some contemporary European monarchies (except that the eldest son by a non-principal consort was duly considered). After the fall of the dynasty in 1644 and the Chongzhen Emperor's suicide, a series of Ming princes based in the south of China claimed the imperial title, their court being known as the Southern Ming. These claimants are given with their era names, and the timespans of their purported reigns in brackets. Their purported periods of rule are given in brackets. In 1662, Koxinga regained control of Taiwan from the Dutch colonial regime, and established a state for those who wished restore the Ming dynasty to power. This state lasted until 1683, when it submitted to the Qing dynasty.

Legend:

- – Ming dynasty emperors
- – Southern Ming emperors

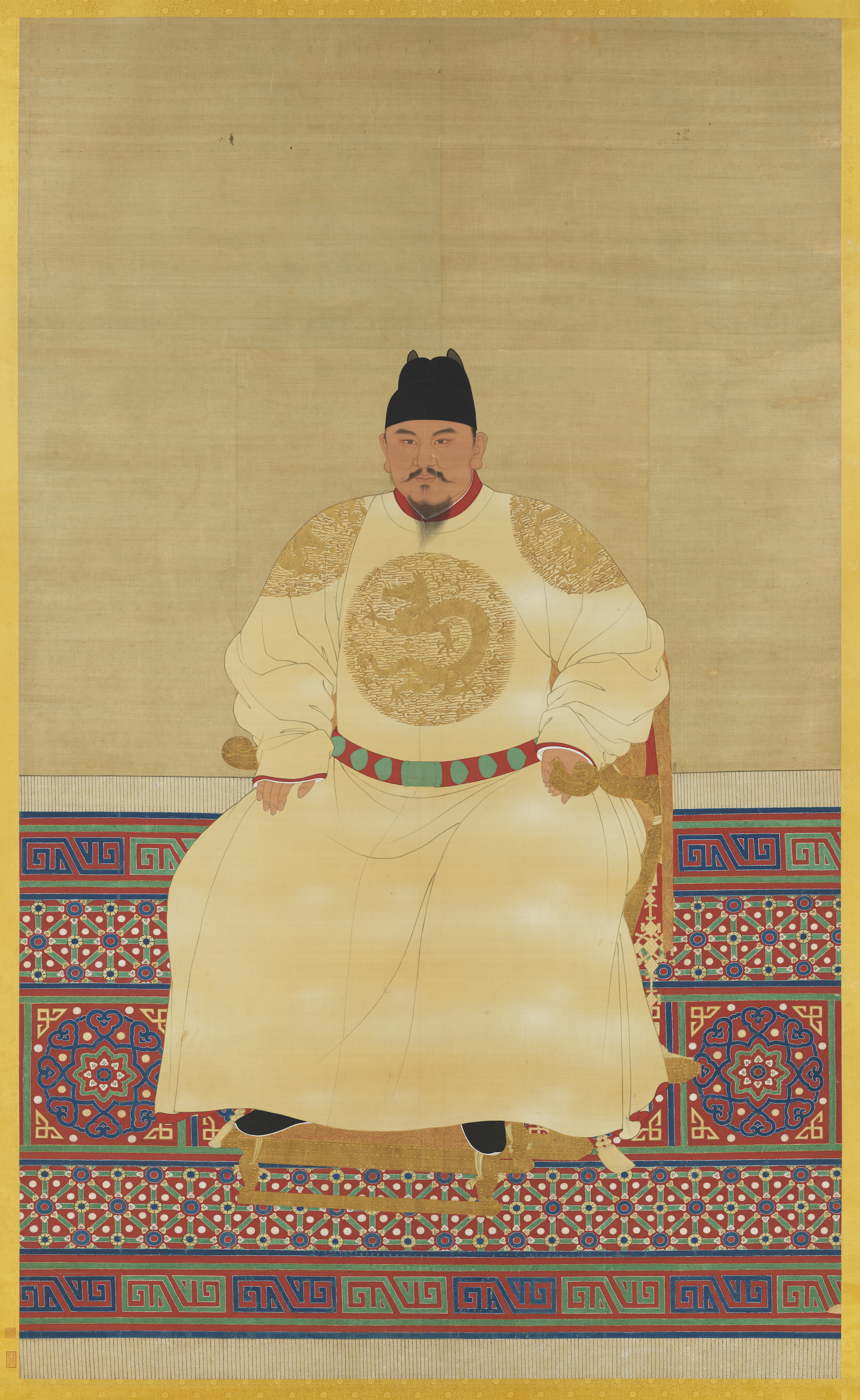
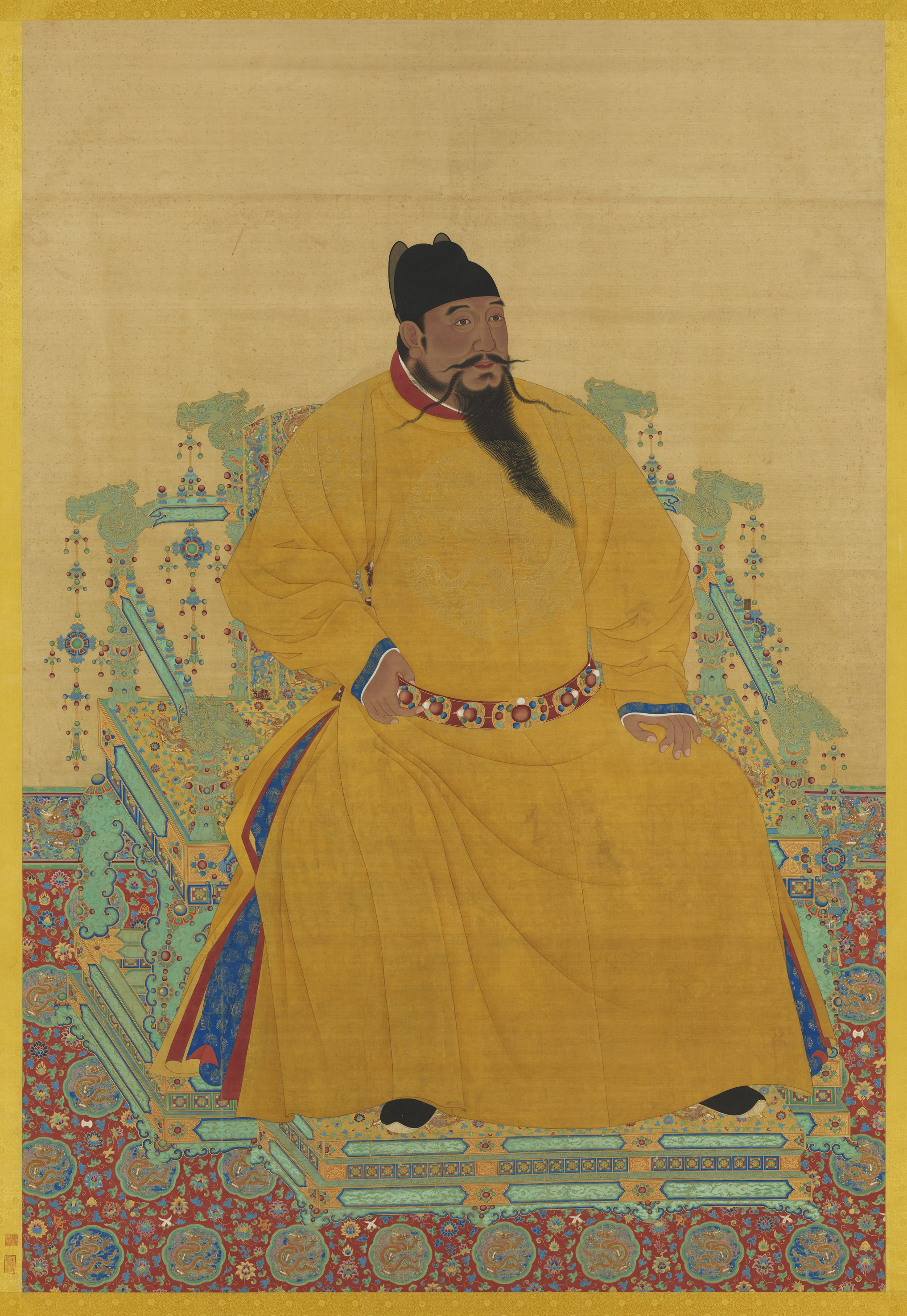
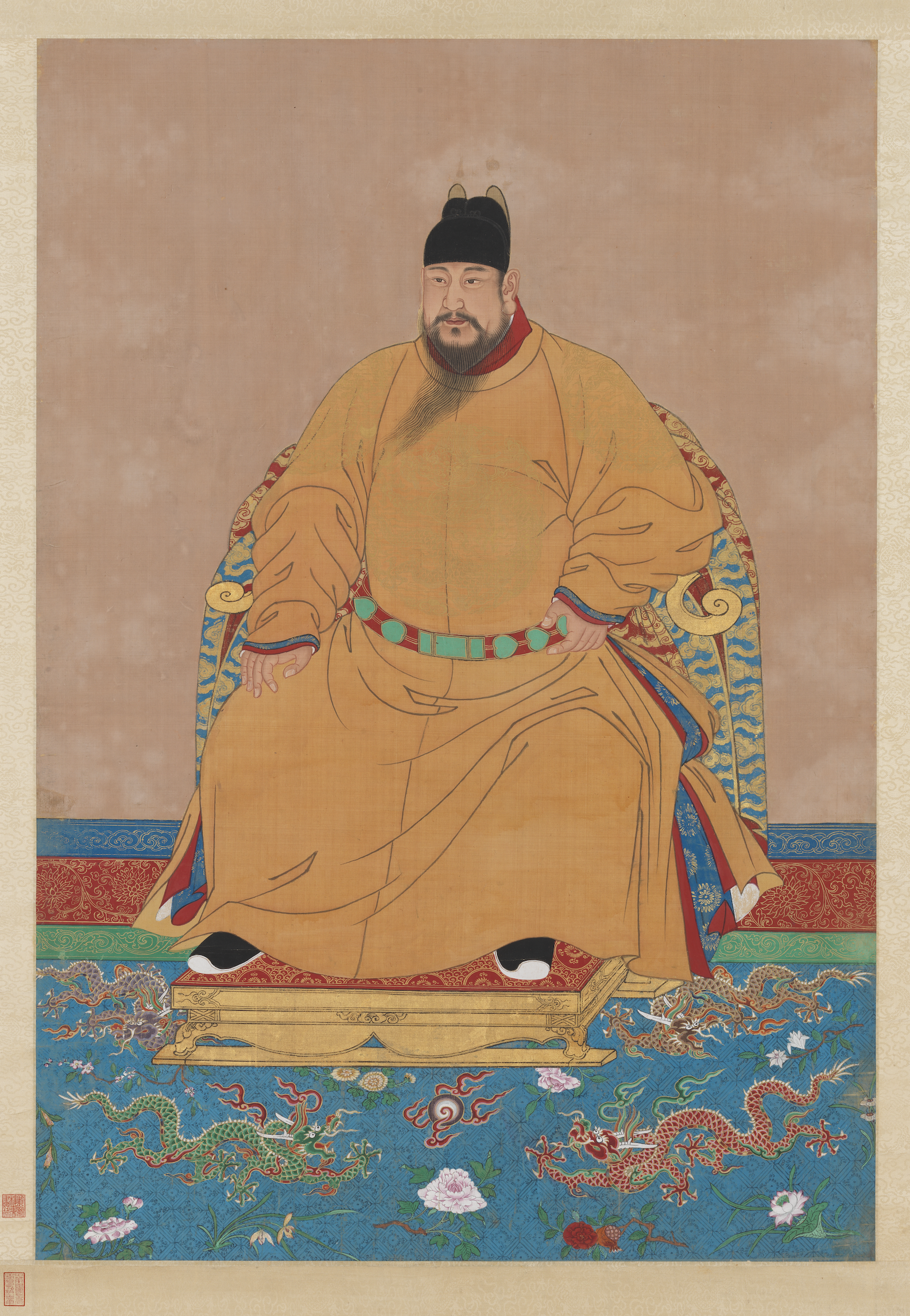
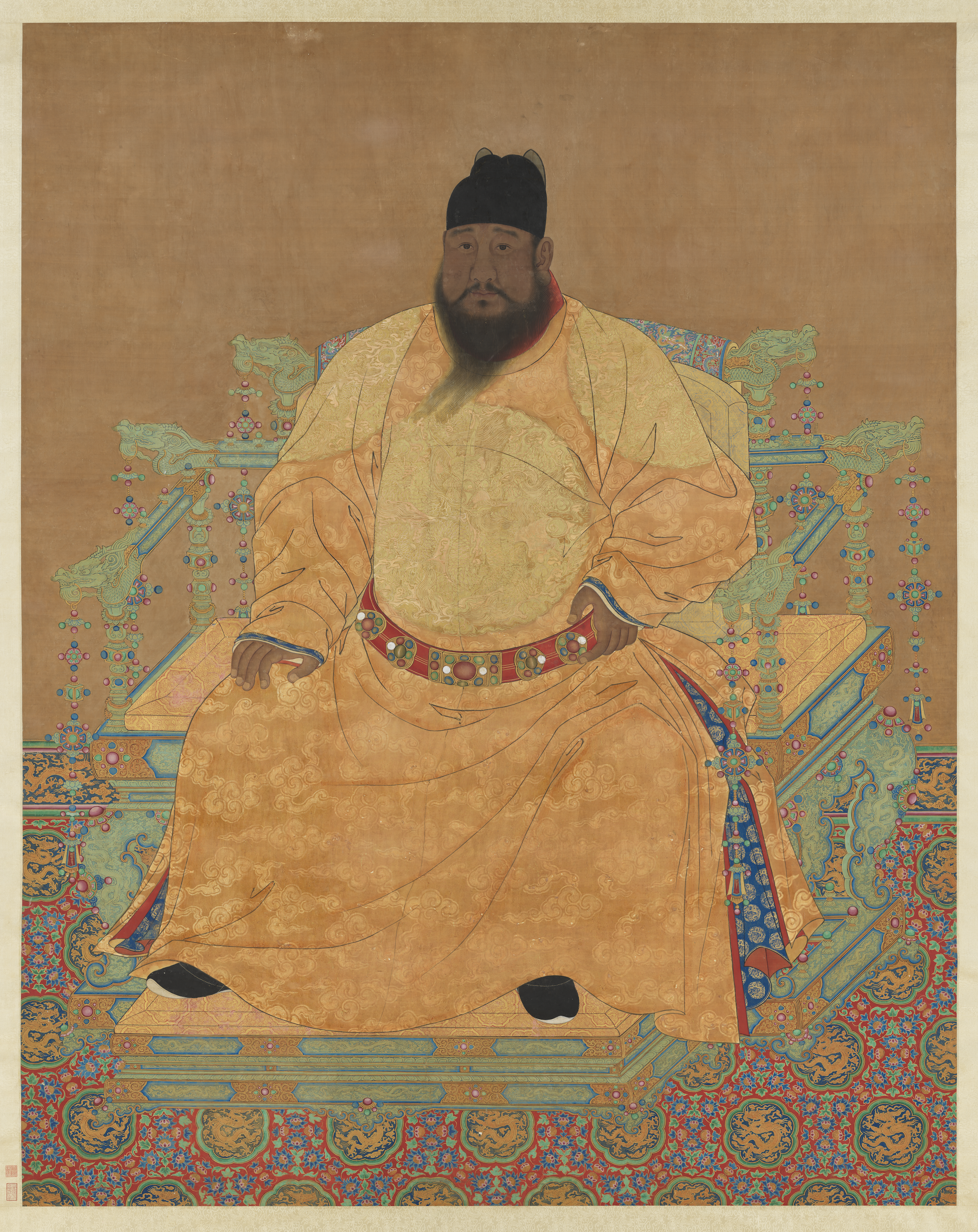
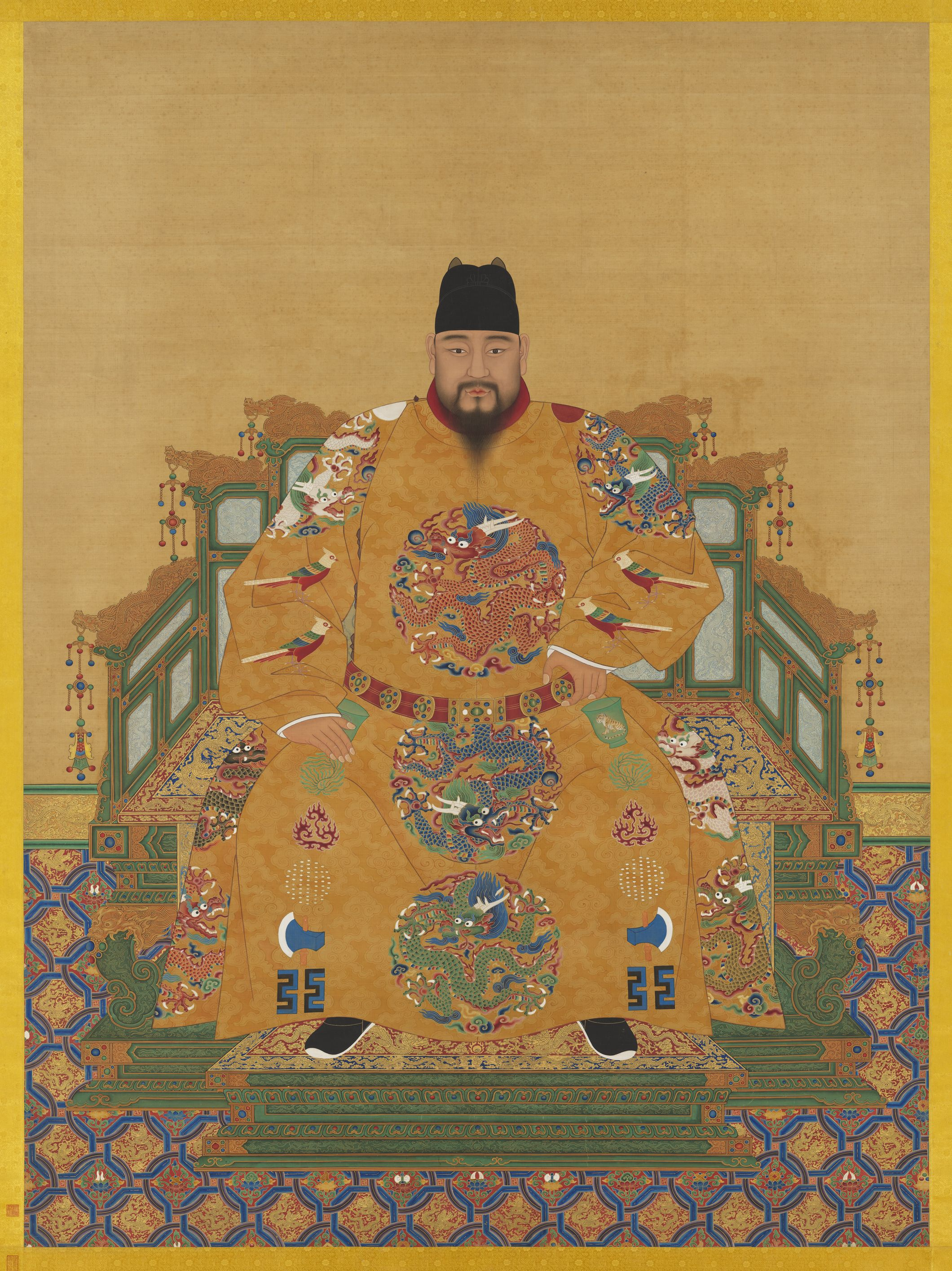
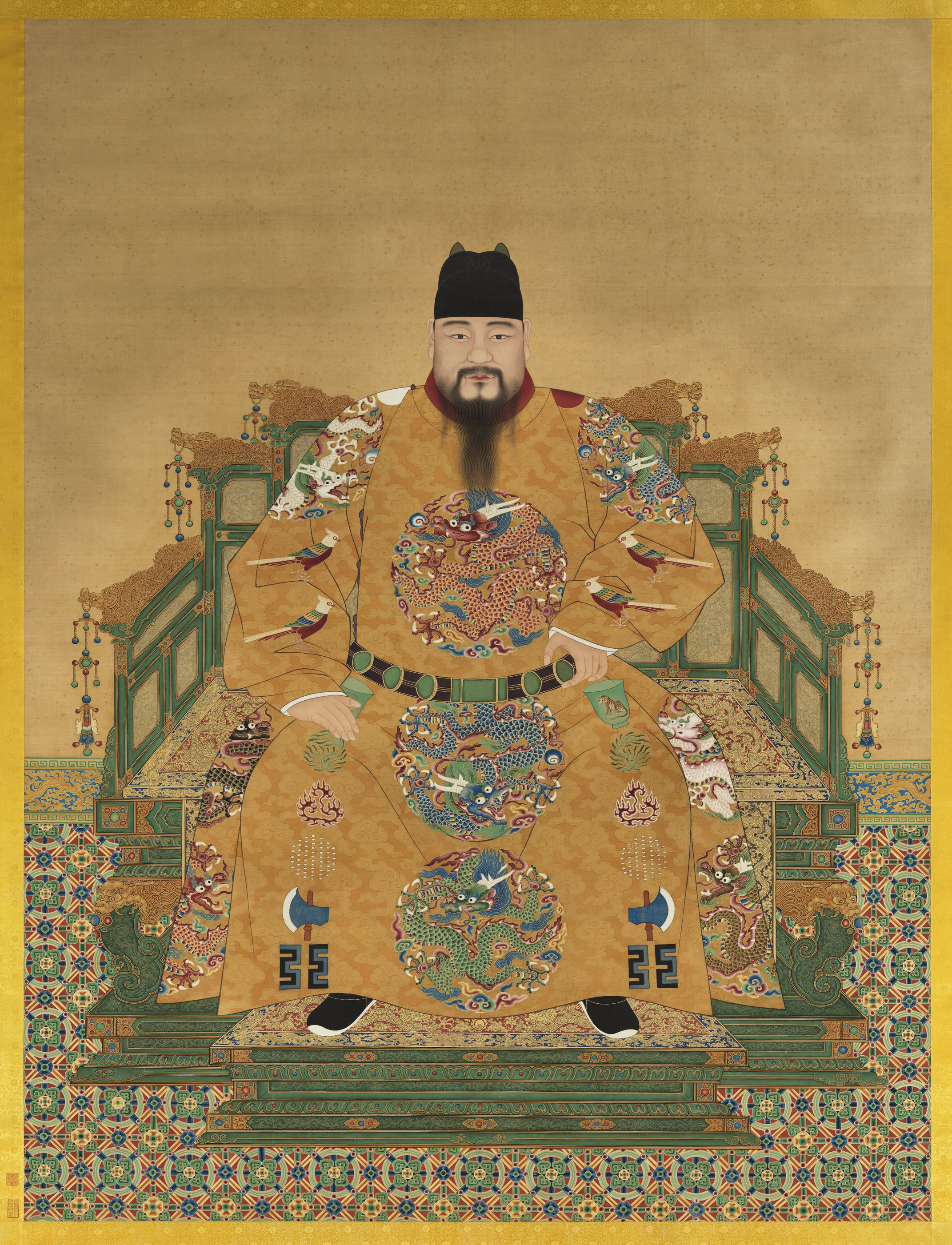
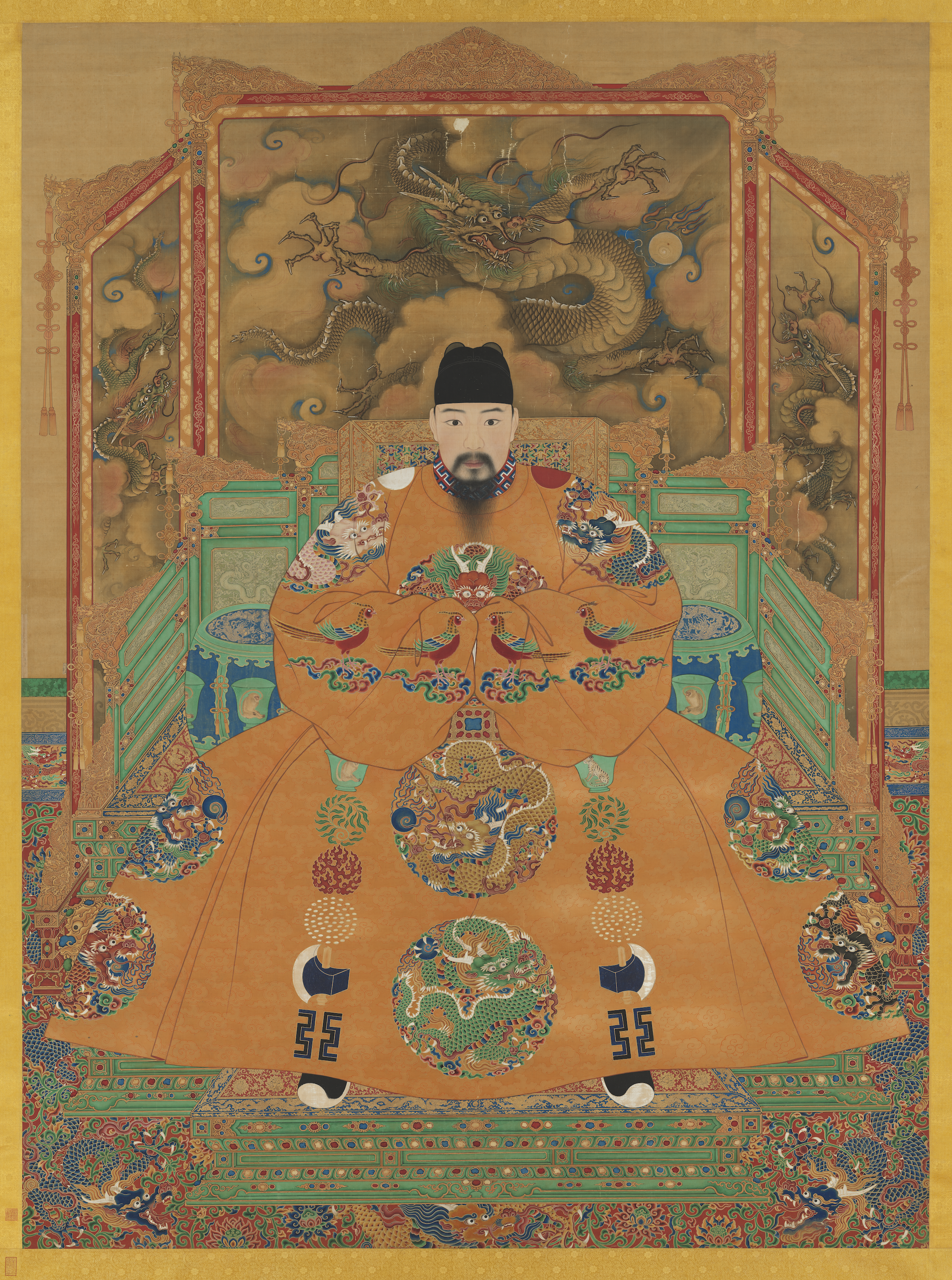
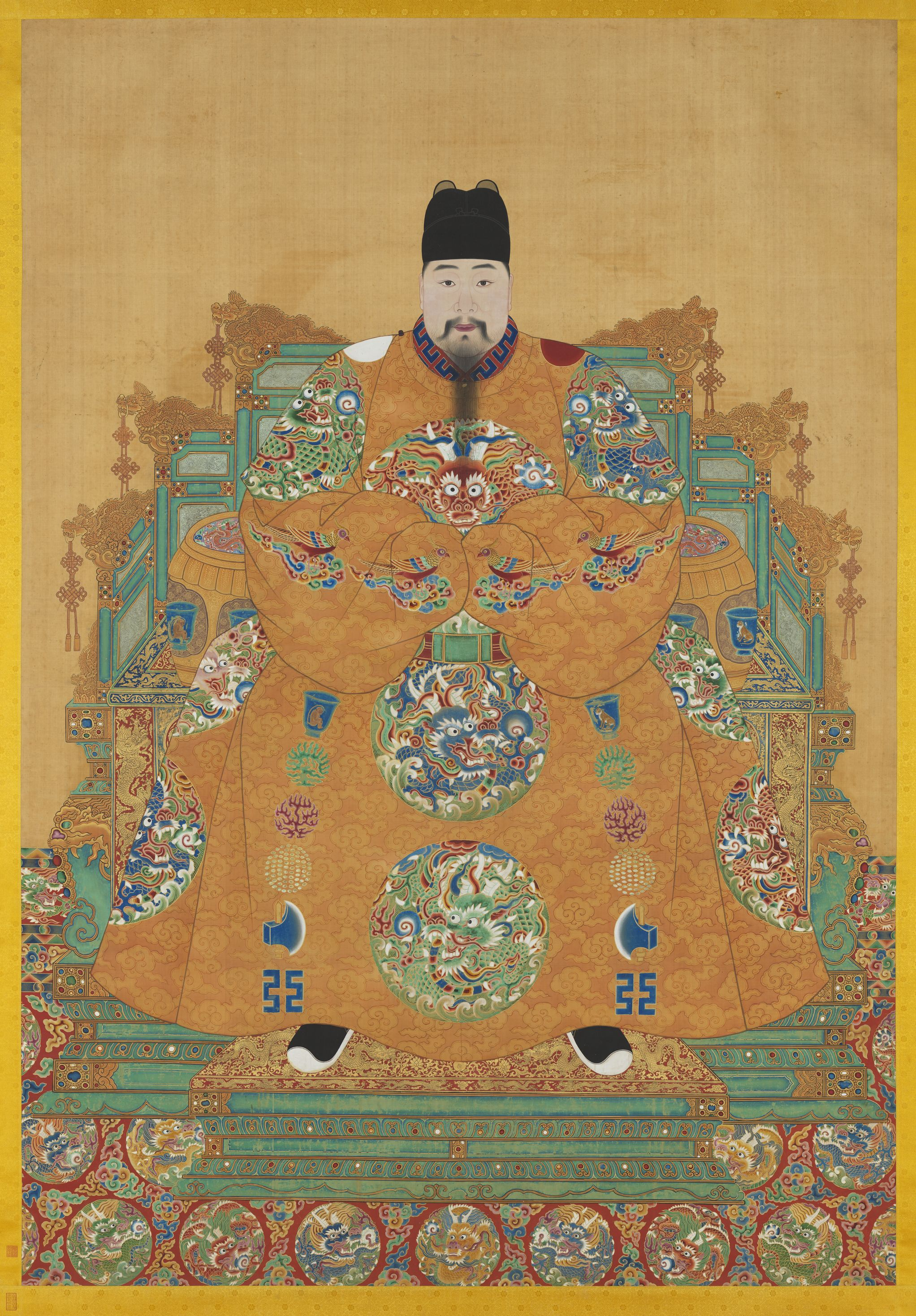
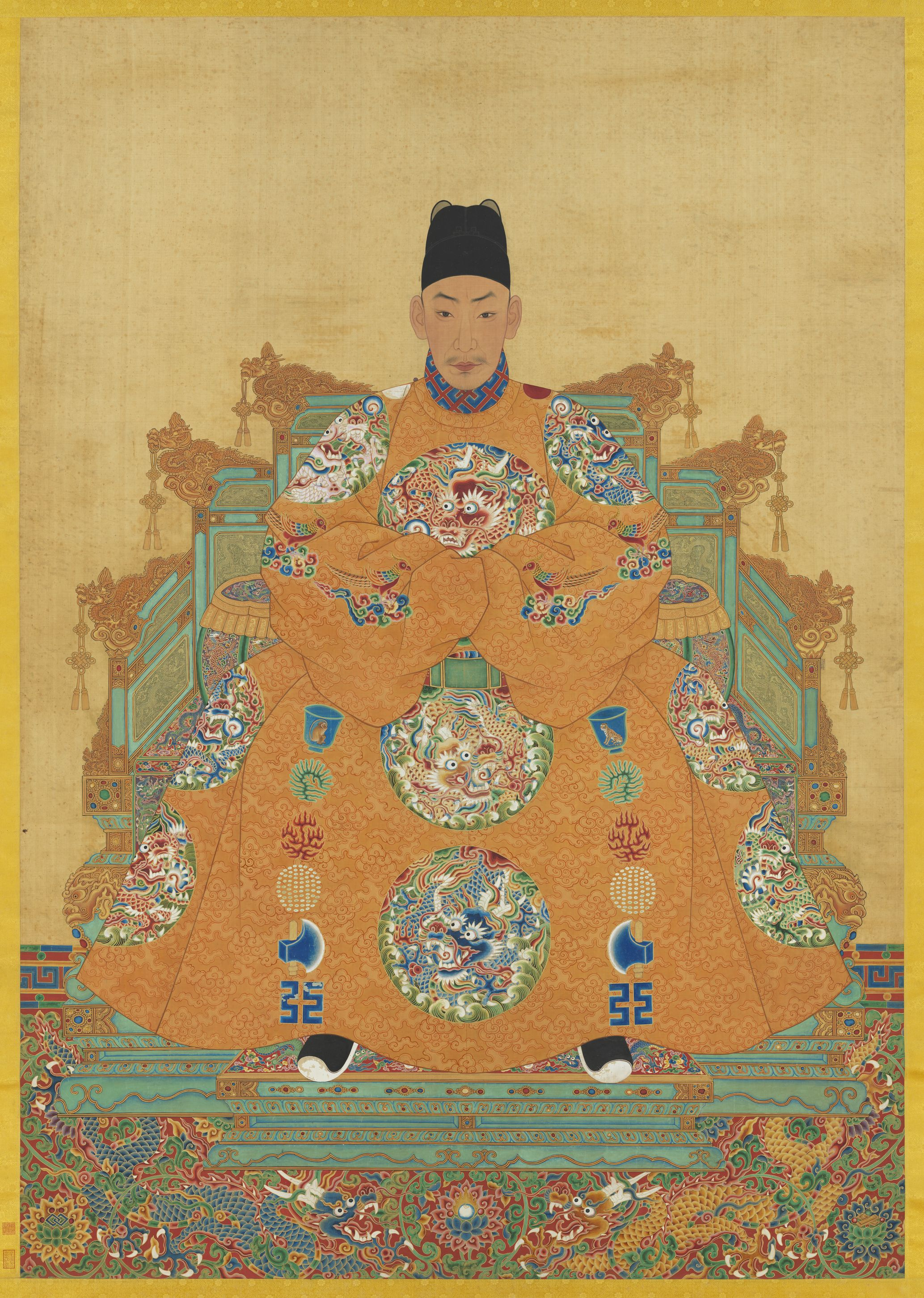
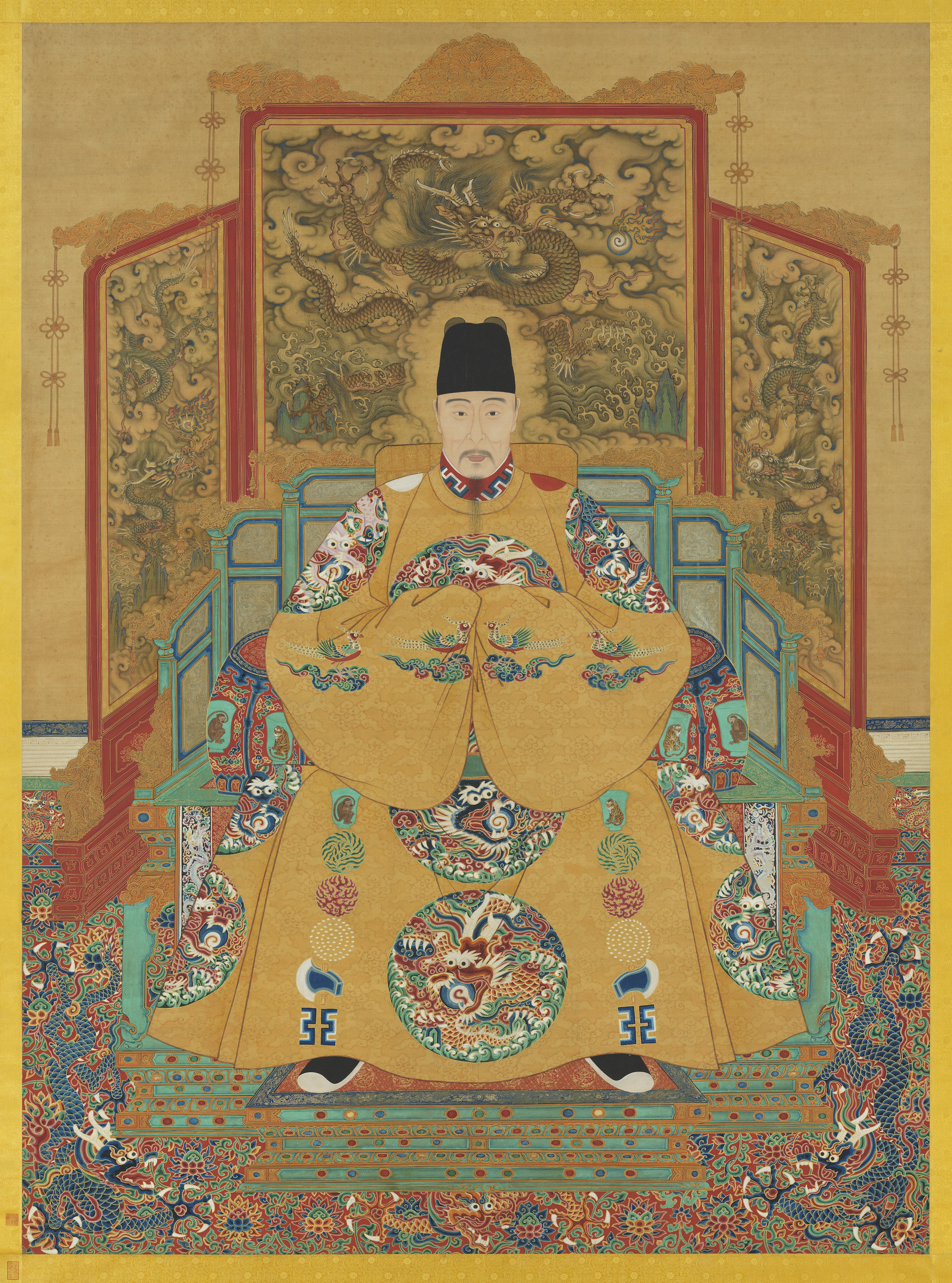
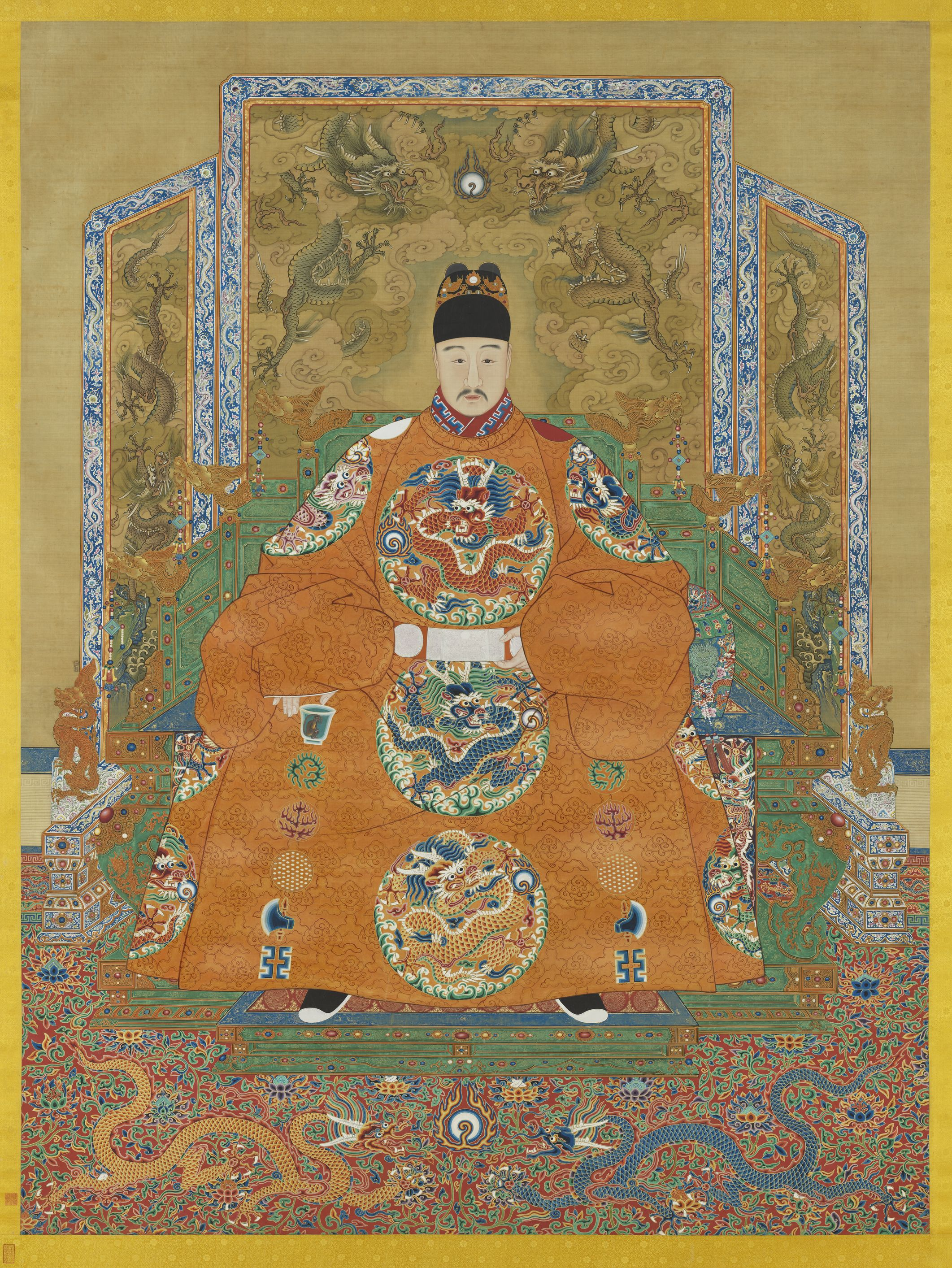
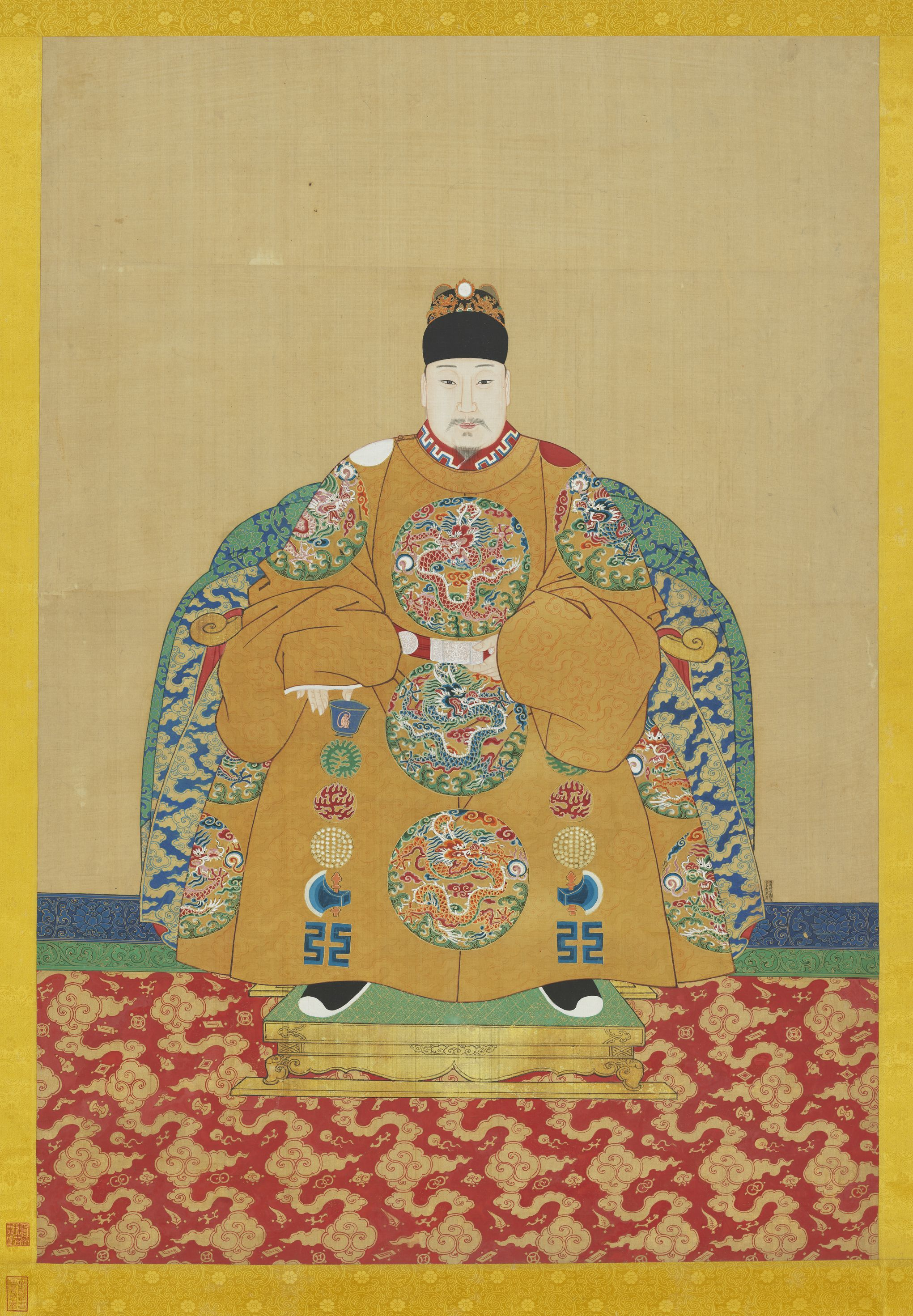
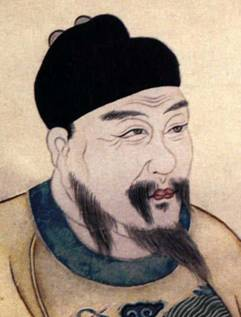
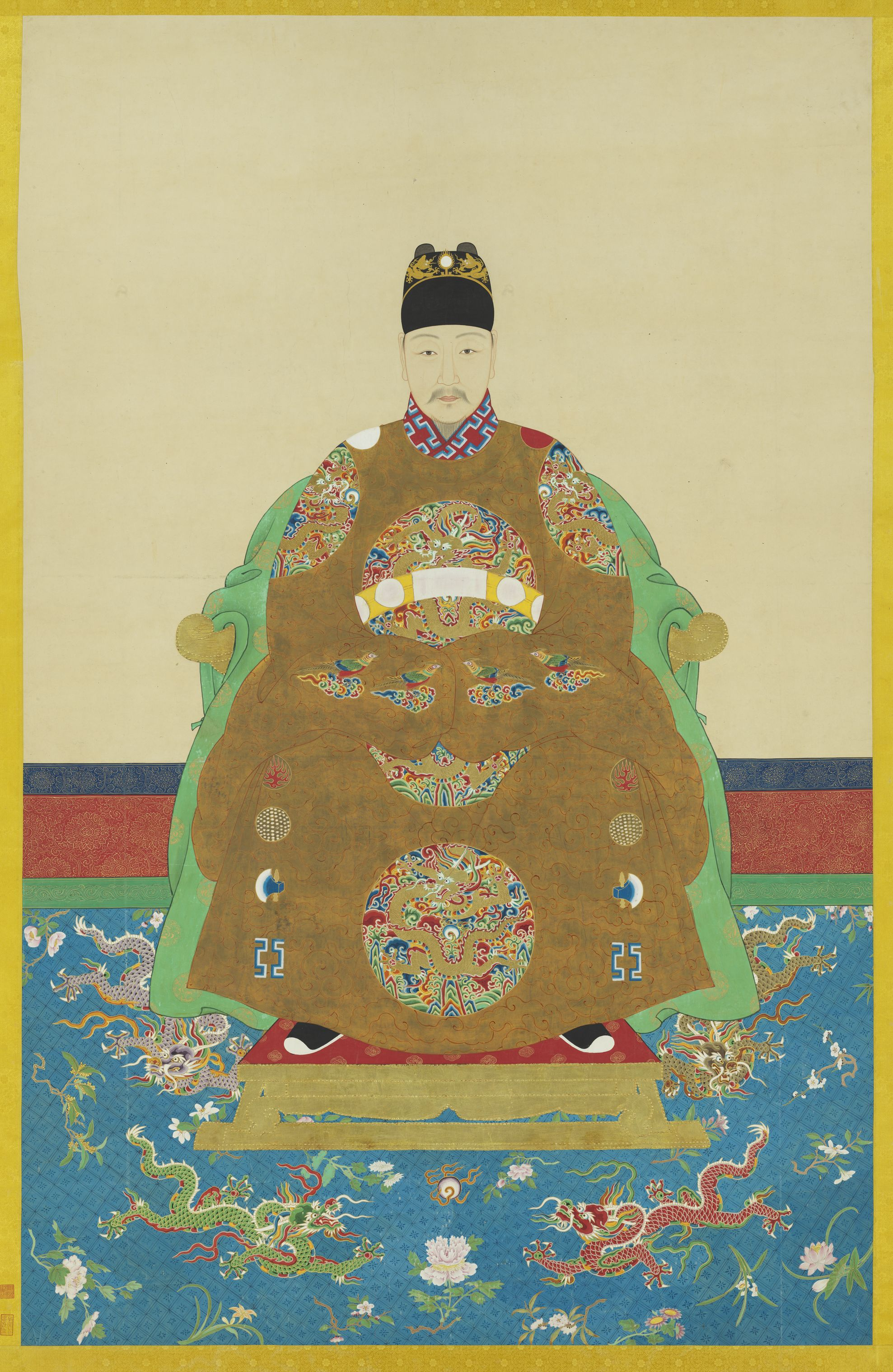
Zhu Yuanzhang 朱元璋; 1328–1398 Taizu 太祖; **Hongwu 洪武** r. 1368–1398
1	4	10	17	23
Zhu Biao 朱標; 1355–1392; Xingzong 興宗	Zhu Di 朱棣; 1360–1424 Chengzu 成祖; **Yongle 永樂** r. 1402–1424	Zhu Tan 朱檀; 1370–1389; Prince Huang of Lu 魯荒王	Zhu Quan 朱權; 1378–1448; Prince of Ning 寧王	Zhu Jing 朱桱; 1388–1415; Prince Ding of Tang 唐定王
2	1	1
Zhu Yunwen 朱允炆; 1377–1402? Huidi 惠帝; **Jianwen 建文** r. 1398–1402	Zhu Gaochi 朱高熾; 1378–1425 Renzong 仁宗; **Hongxi 洪熙** r. 1424–1425	Zhu Zhaohui 朱肇煇; 1388–1466; Prince Jing of Lu	Zhu Qiongda 朱瓊炟 d. 1475; Prince Xian of Tang 唐憲王
1	1	7	1
Zhu Wenkui 朱文奎; 1396-?	Zhu Zhanji 朱瞻基; 1399–1435 Xuanzong 宣宗; **Xuande 宣德** r. 1425–1435	Zhu Zhanyu 朱瞻墺; 1409–1446; Prince Jing of Huai 淮靖王	Zhu Taikan 朱泰堪; 1412–1473; Prince Hui of Lu 魯惠王	Zhu Zhizhi 朱芝址 d. 1485; Prince Zhuang of Tang 唐莊王
1	2	1
Zhu Qizhen 朱祁鎮; 1427–1464 Yingzong 英宗; **Zhengtong 正统** r. 1435–1449; **Tianshun 天順** r. 1457–1464	Zhu Qiyu 朱祁鈺; 1428–1457; Daizong 代宗; **Jingtai 景泰** r. 1449–1457	Zhu Qiquan 朱祁銓; 1435–1502; Prince Kang of Huai 淮康王	Zhu Yangzhu 朱陽鑄; 1448–1523; Prince Zhuāng of Lu 魯莊王	Zhu Miqian 朱彌鉗; Prince Gong of Tang 唐恭王
1	1
Zhu Jianshen 朱見深; 1447–1487 Xianzong 憲宗; **Chenghua 成化** r. 1464–1487	Zhu Jiandian 朱見澱 ?–1502; Prince Duan of Huai 淮端王	Zhu Dangcong 朱當漎; 1473–1505; Prince Huai of Lu 魯懷王	Zhu Yuwen 朱宇溫 d. 1560; Prince Jing of Tang 唐敬王
3	4	1
Zhu Youcheng 朱祐樘; 1470–1505 Xiaozong 孝宗; **Hongzhi 弘治** r. 1487–1505	Zhu Youyuan 朱祐杬; 1476–1519 Ruizong 睿宗	Zhu Youkui 朱祐楑; 1500–1537; Prince Zhuang of Huai 淮莊王	Zhu Jianyi 朱健杙; 1494–1520; Prince Dao of Lu 魯悼王	Zhu Zhouyong 朱宙栐 d.1564 Prince Shun of Tang 唐順王
1	2	1
Zhu Houzhao 朱厚照; 1491–1521 Wuzong 武宗; **Zhengde 正德** r. 1505–1521	Zhu Houcong 朱厚熜; 1507–1567 Shizong 世宗; **Jiajing 嘉靖** r. 1521–1567	Zhu Houchou 朱厚燽; 1519–1563; Prince Xian of Huai 淮宪王	朱觀𤊟; 1520–1549; Prince Duan of Lu 魯端王	Zhu Shuohuang 朱碩熿 d. 1632; Prince Duan of Tang 唐端王
3	1
Zhu Zaiji 朱載坖; 1537–1572 Muzong 穆宗; **Longqing 隆慶** r. 1567–1572	Zhu Zaijian 朱载坚 ?–1595; Prince Shun of Huai 淮顺王	Zhu Yitan 朱頤坦 ?–1594; Prince Gong of Lu 魯恭王	Zhu Qisheng 朱器墭; Prince Yu of Tang 唐裕王
3	4	9
Zhu Yijun 朱翊鈞; 1563–1620 Shenzong 神宗; **Wanli 萬曆** r. 1572–1620	Zhu Yiliu 朱翊镠; 1568–1614; Prince of Lu	Zhū Yiju 朱翊鉅 ?–1616; Prince of Huai 淮王	Zhu Shouyong 朱壽鏞 ?–1639; Prince Su of Lu 魯肅王	Zhu Yujian 朱聿鍵; 1602–1646 Prince of Tang 唐王; **Longwu** 隆武; 1645–1646	Zhu Yuyue 朱聿𨮁; 1605–1646; Prince of Tang 唐王; **Shaowu** 紹武 r. 1646
1	3	7	3	5
Zhu Changluo 朱常洛; 1582–1620 Guangzong 光宗; **Taichang 泰昌** r. 1620	Zhu Changxun 朱常洵; 1586–1641; Prince Zhong of Fu 福忠王	Zhu; Changying 朱常瀛; 1601–1645; Prince Duan of Gui 桂端王	**Zhu**; **Changfang** 朱常淓; 1608–1646; Prince of Lu 潞王	Zhu Changqing 朱常清 d.1649 Prince of Huai; **Dongwu** 東武 r. 1648–1649	Zhu Yihai 朱以海; 1618–1662; **Gengyin** r. 1645–1655	Zheng; Chenggong 鄭成功; 1624–1662; Koxinga 國姓爺; Ruler of the Tungning r. 1661–1662
1	5	8	4
Zhu Youjiao 朱由校; 1605–1627 Xizong 熹宗; **Tianqi 天啟** r. 1620–1627	Zhu Youjian 朱由檢; 1611–1644 Sizong 思宗; **Chongzhen** **崇禎** r. 1627–1644	Zhu Yousong 朱由崧; 1607–1646; Prince of Fu 福王; **Hongguang** 弘光 r. 1644–1645	Zhu Youlang 朱由榔; 1623–1662; Prince of Gui 桂王; **Yongli** 永曆 r. 1646–1662	Zhu Honghuan 朱弘桓	Zhèng Shì 鄭氏

== Later Jin and Qing dynasty ==
The following is a simplified family tree for the Qing dynasty, which was established in 1636, ruled China proper from 1644 to 1912.

Those who became emperor of China are listed in bold, with their years of reign. Nurhaci was Khan of Later Jin from 1616 to 1626. Hong Taiji was Khan of Later Jin from 1626 to 1636, and Emperor of the Qing dynasty from 1636 to 1643. During these periods, the two monarchs only dominated Manchuria, but were not emperors of China as a whole; their years of reign over the dynasty are therefore given in brackets. The names given for emperors are era names, the form by which Qing emperors were most commonly known (with the exception of Puyi, who ruled as the Xuantong Emperor, but was generally known by his given name after his deposition). Puyi abdicated as head of state on February 12, 1912, but was permitted to retain his imperial titles until 1924. The imperial family's original Manchu clan name was Aisin Gioro (lit. "golden clan"). The dynasty was originally titled the Later Jin, in reference to its origins in the Jurchen-led Jin dynasty (1115–1234), by Nurhaci in 1616, but in 1636 Hong Taiji opted to replace this title with the Chinese dynastic title Qing (清), meaning "clear" or "pure".

Legend:

- – Qing dynasty emperors
- – 1st generation of Iron Cap Princes
- – – – – The dashed lines denotes the adoptions

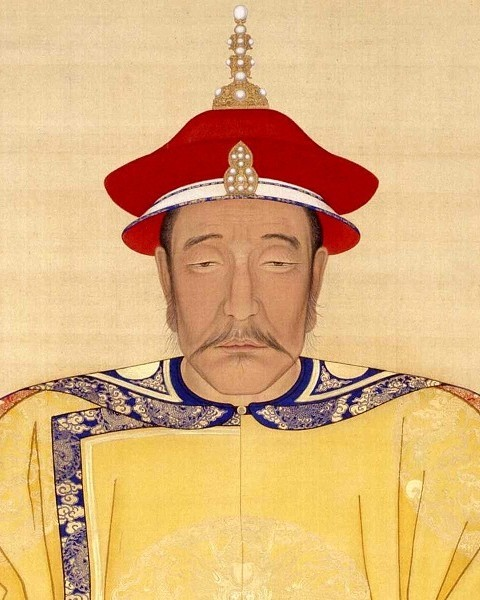
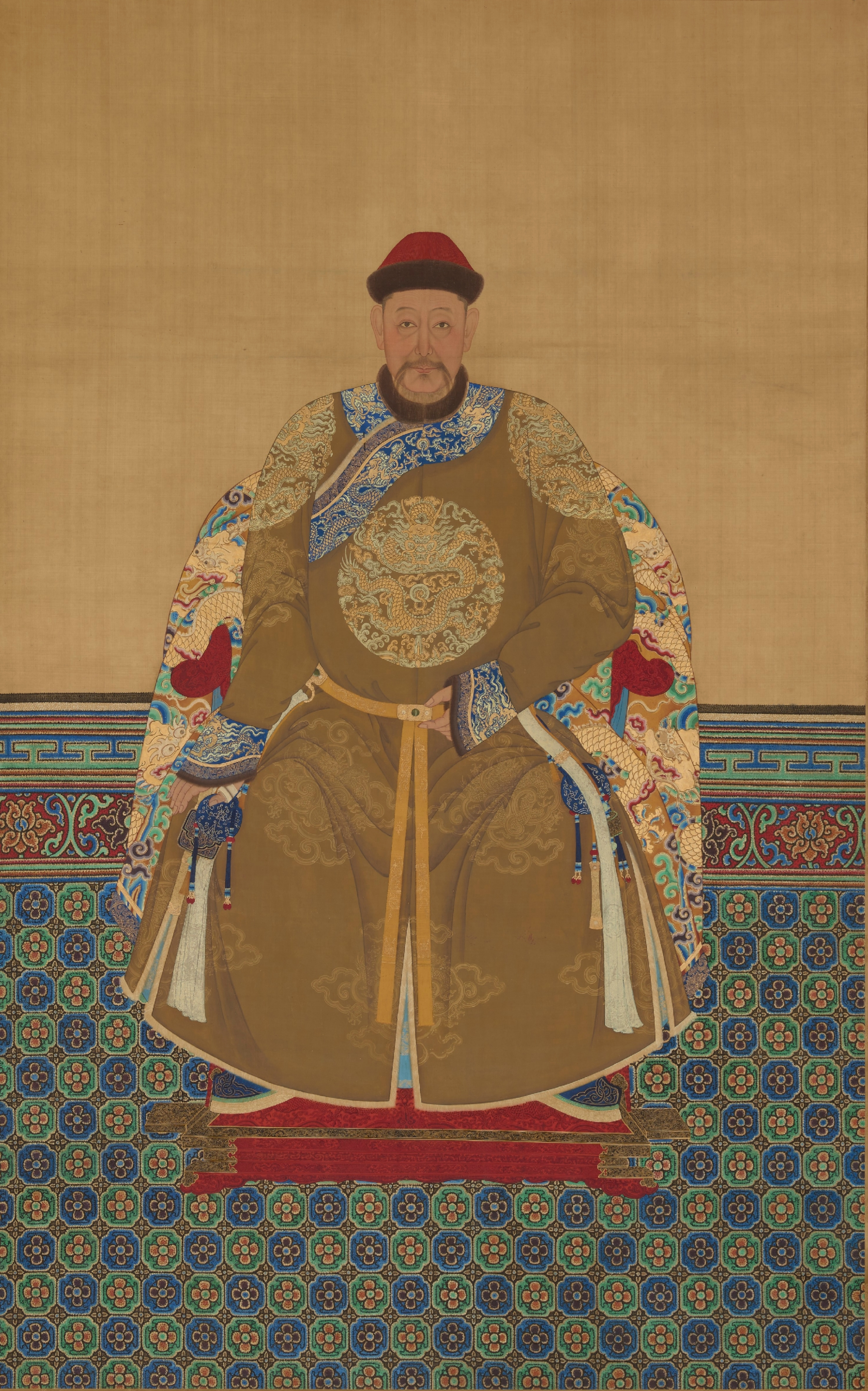
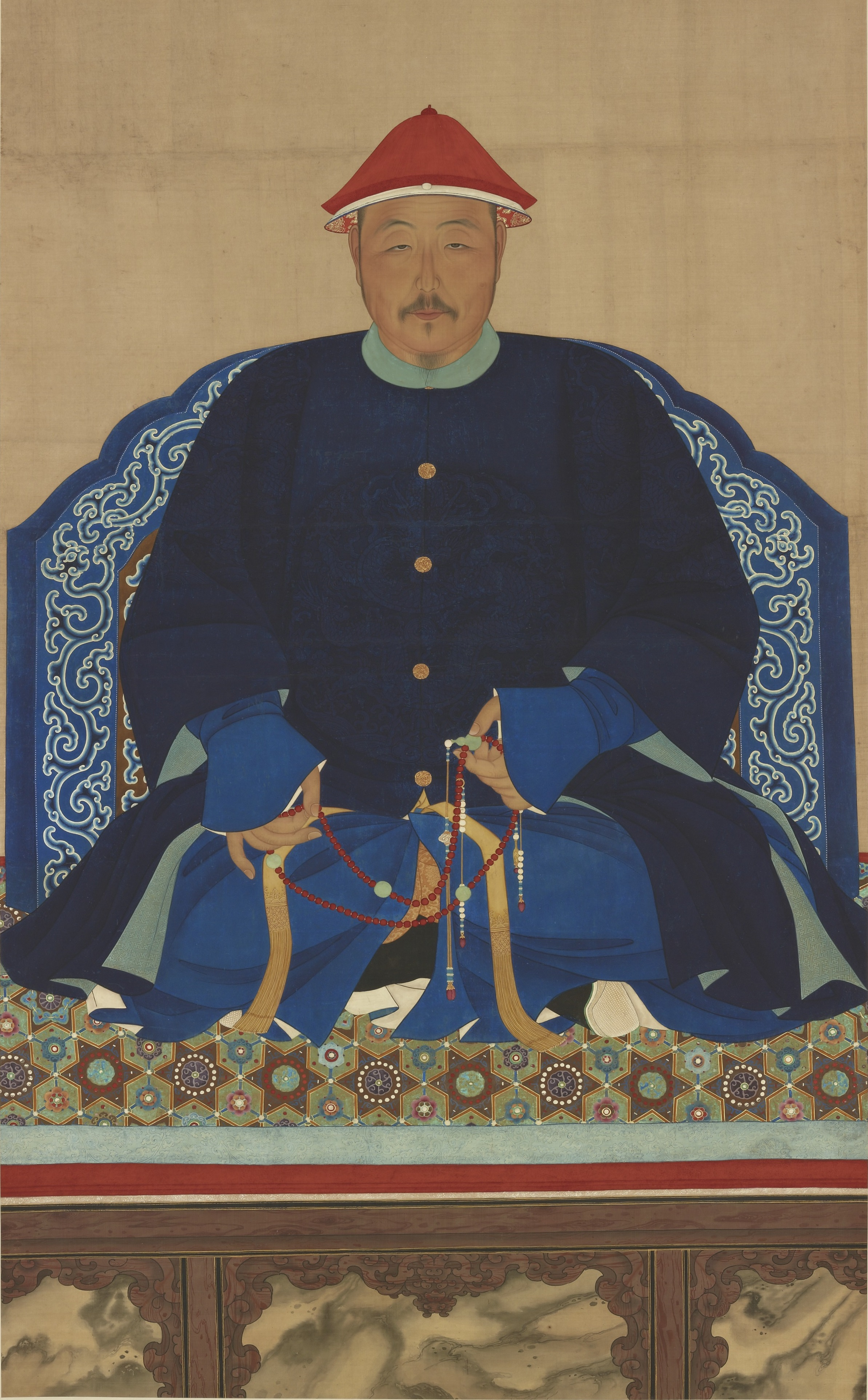
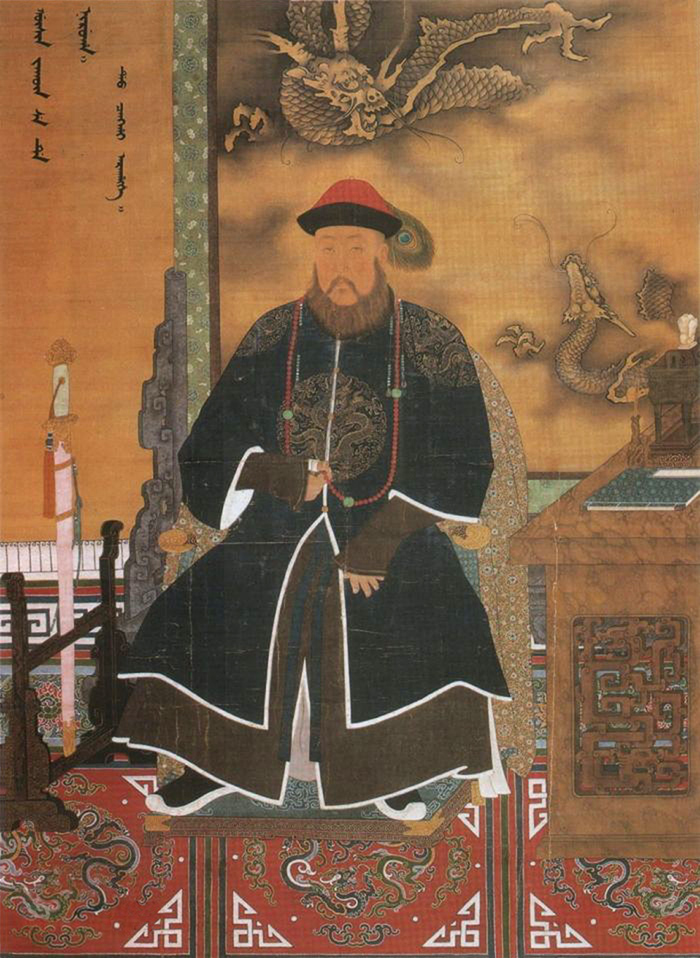
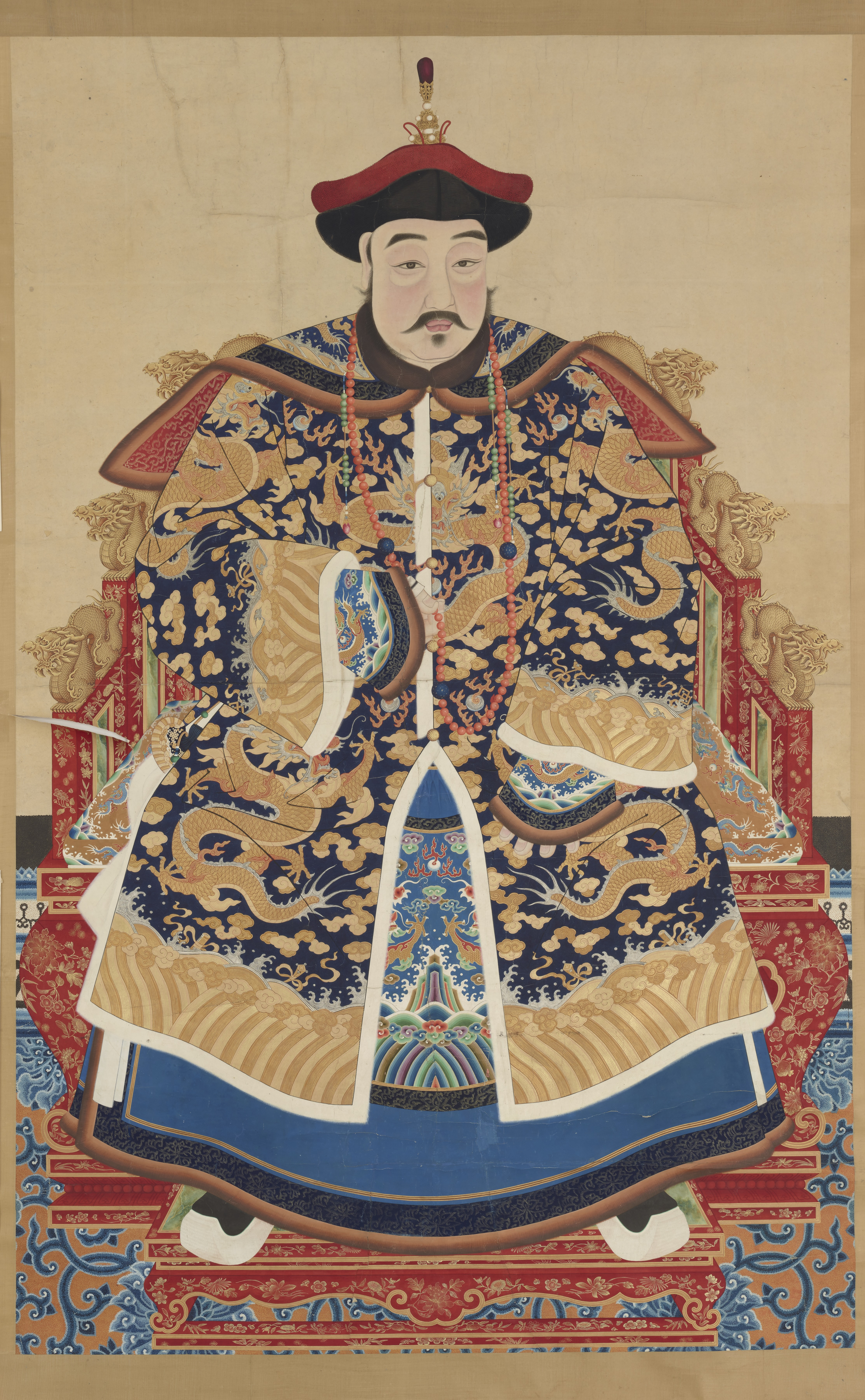
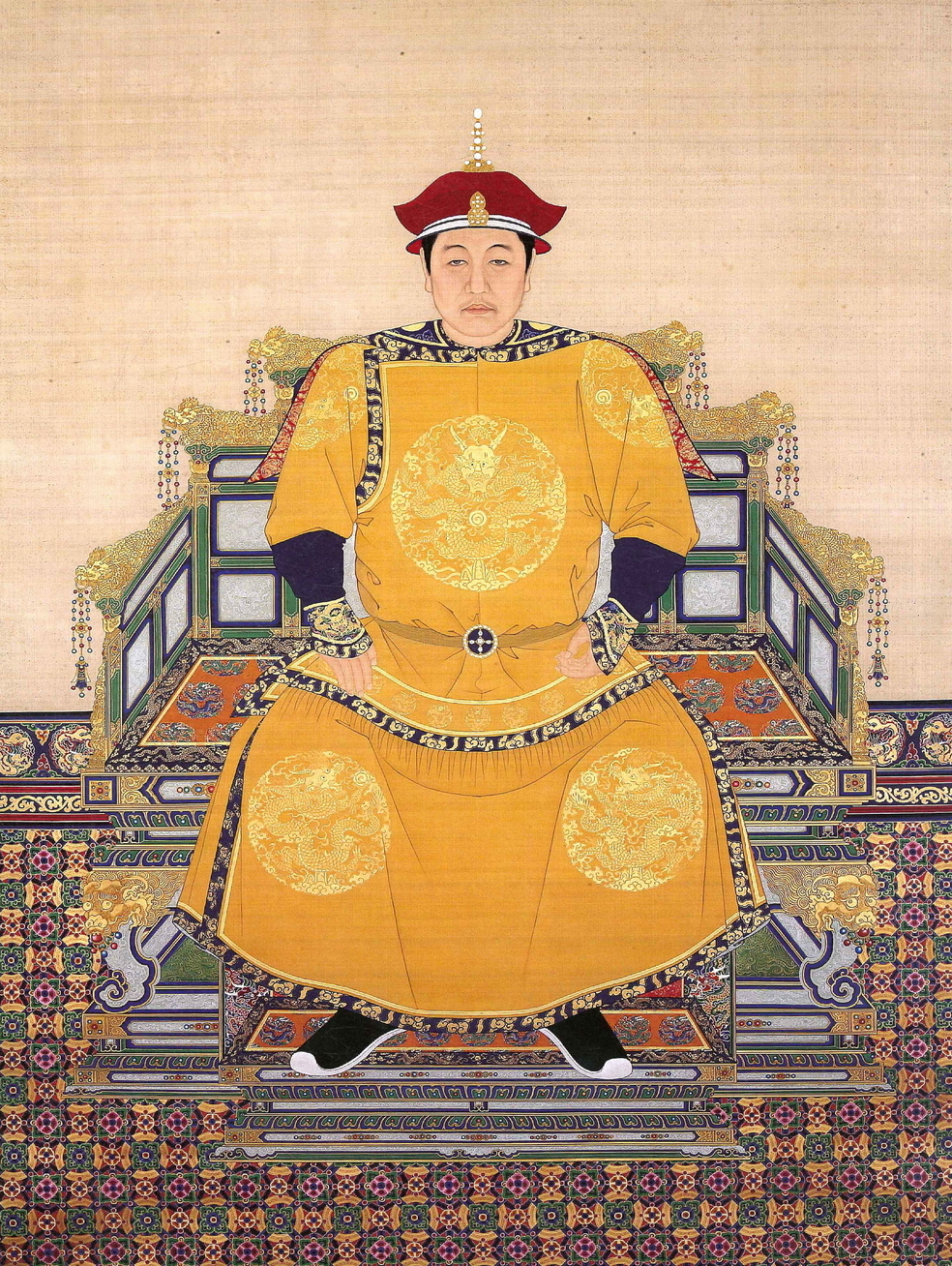
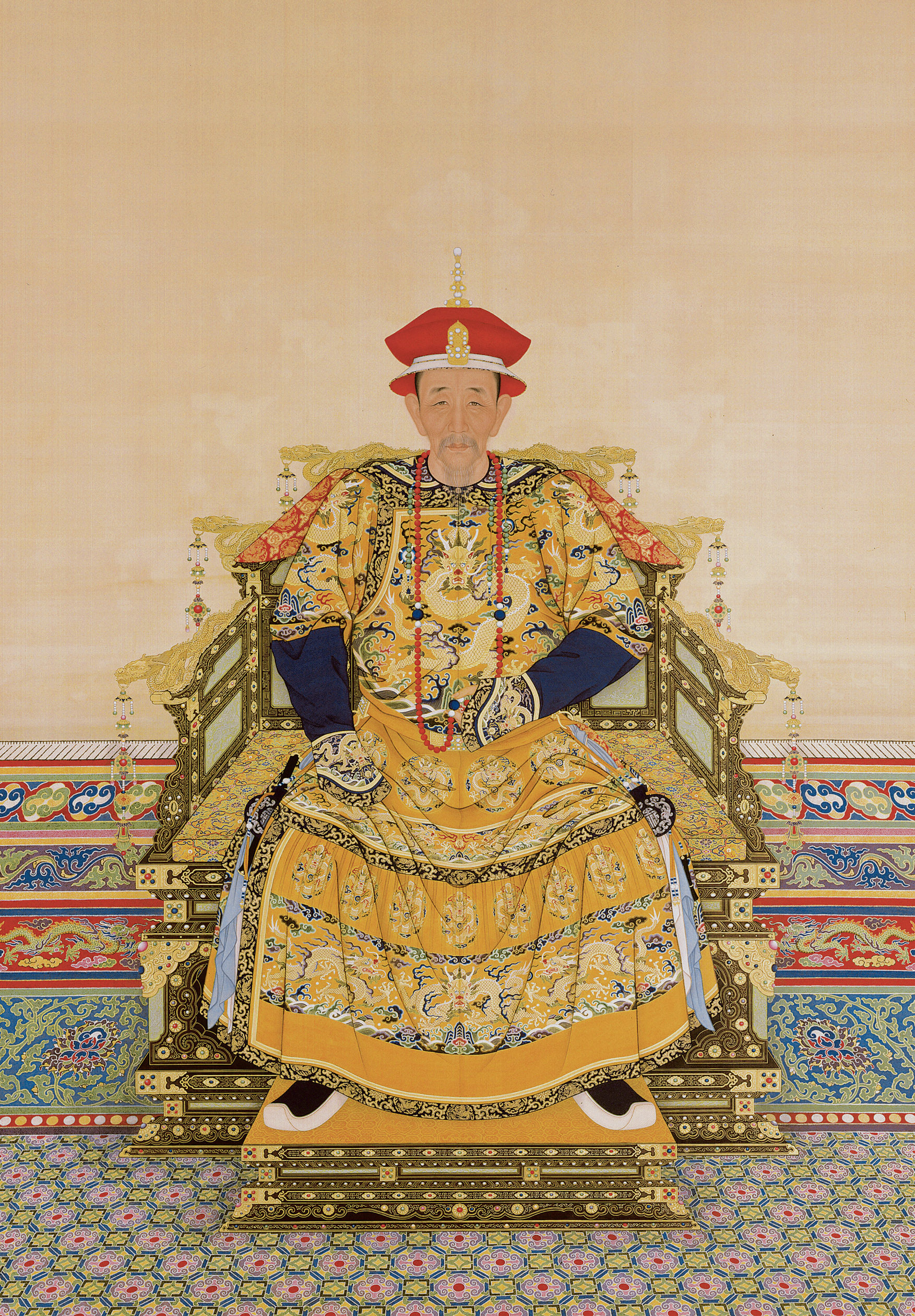
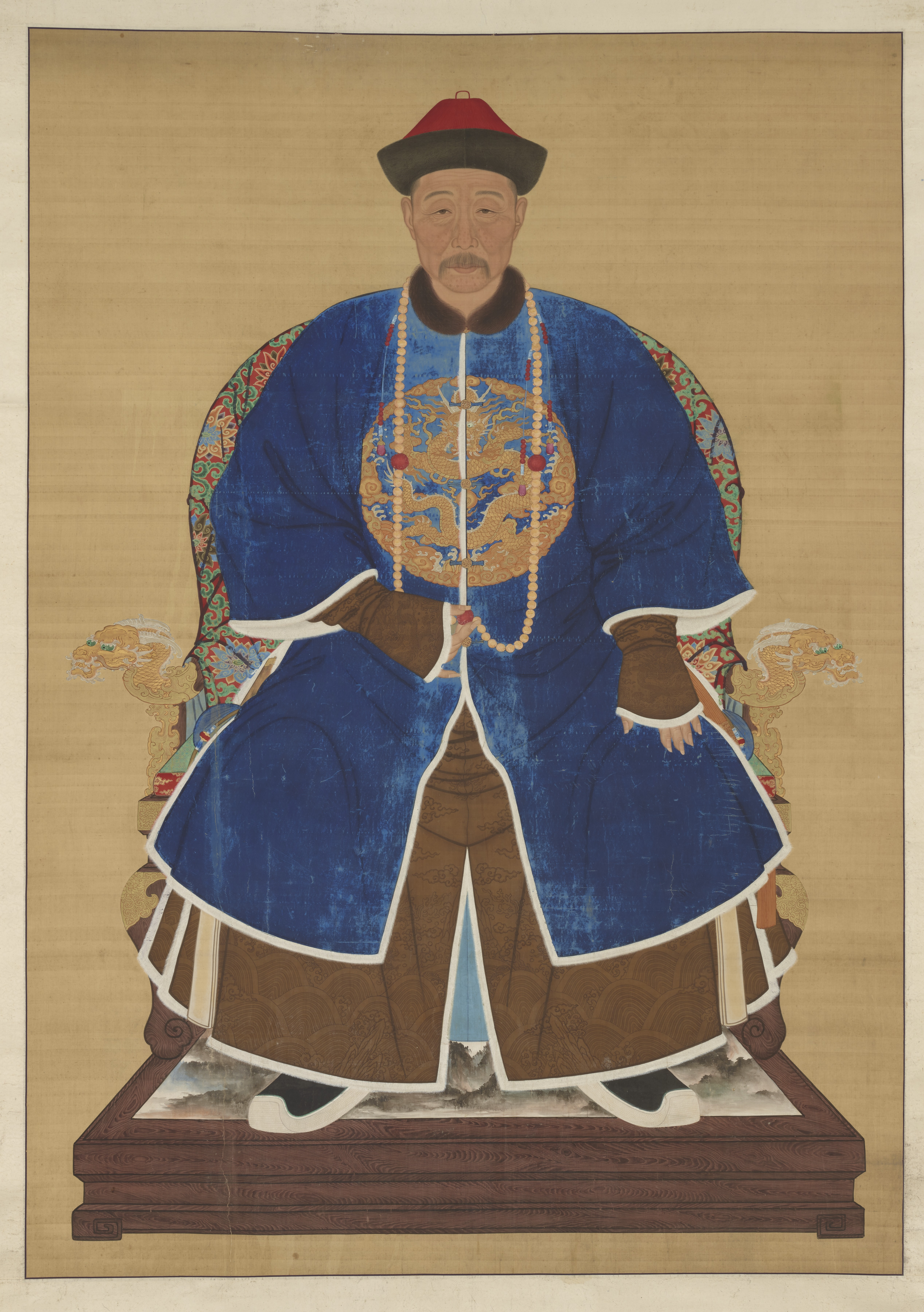
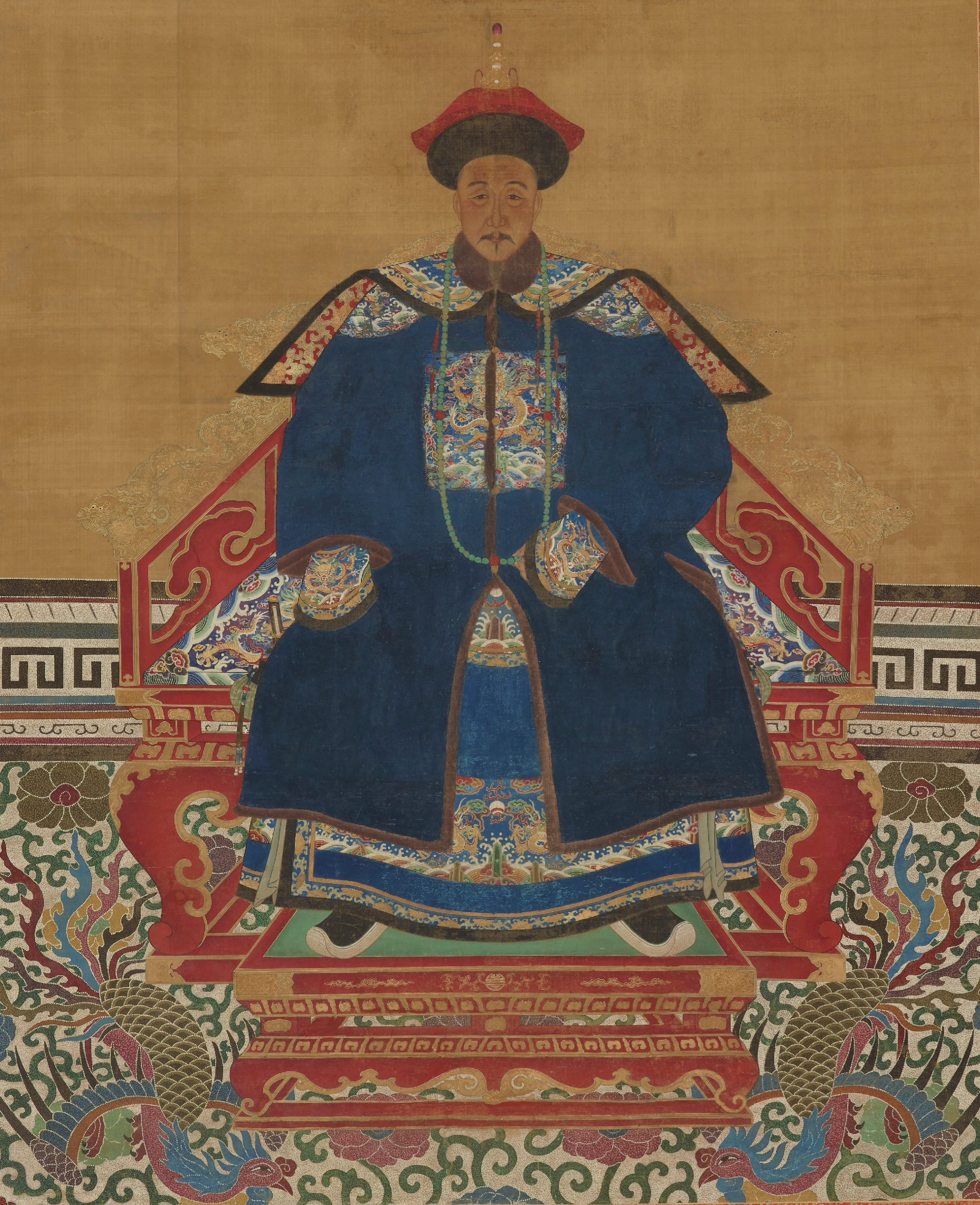
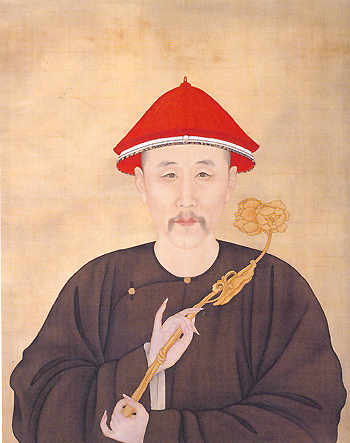
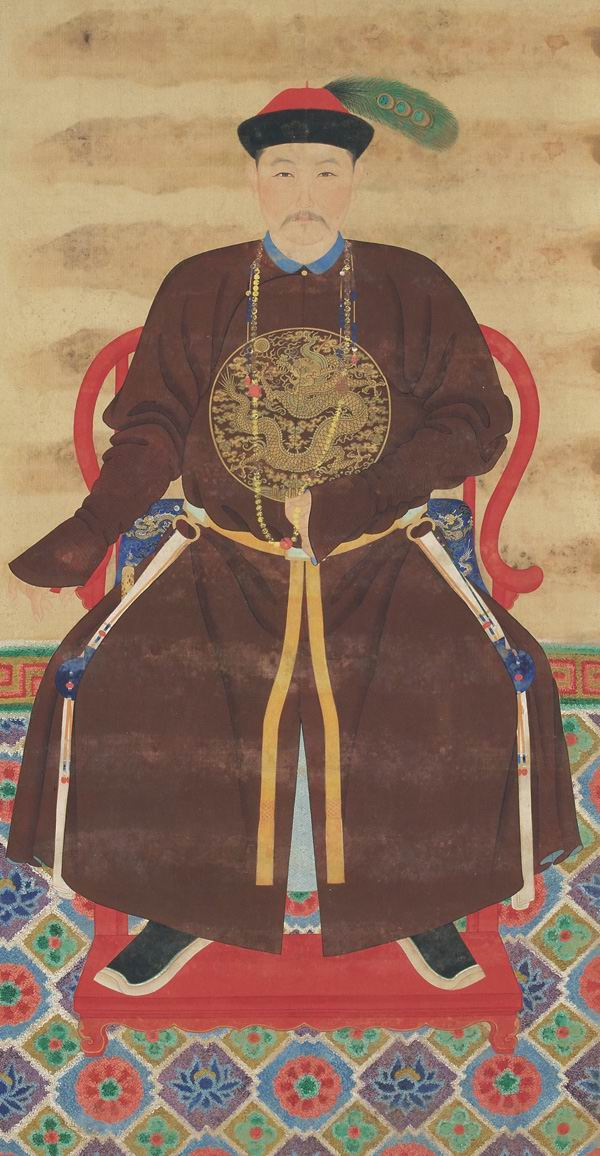
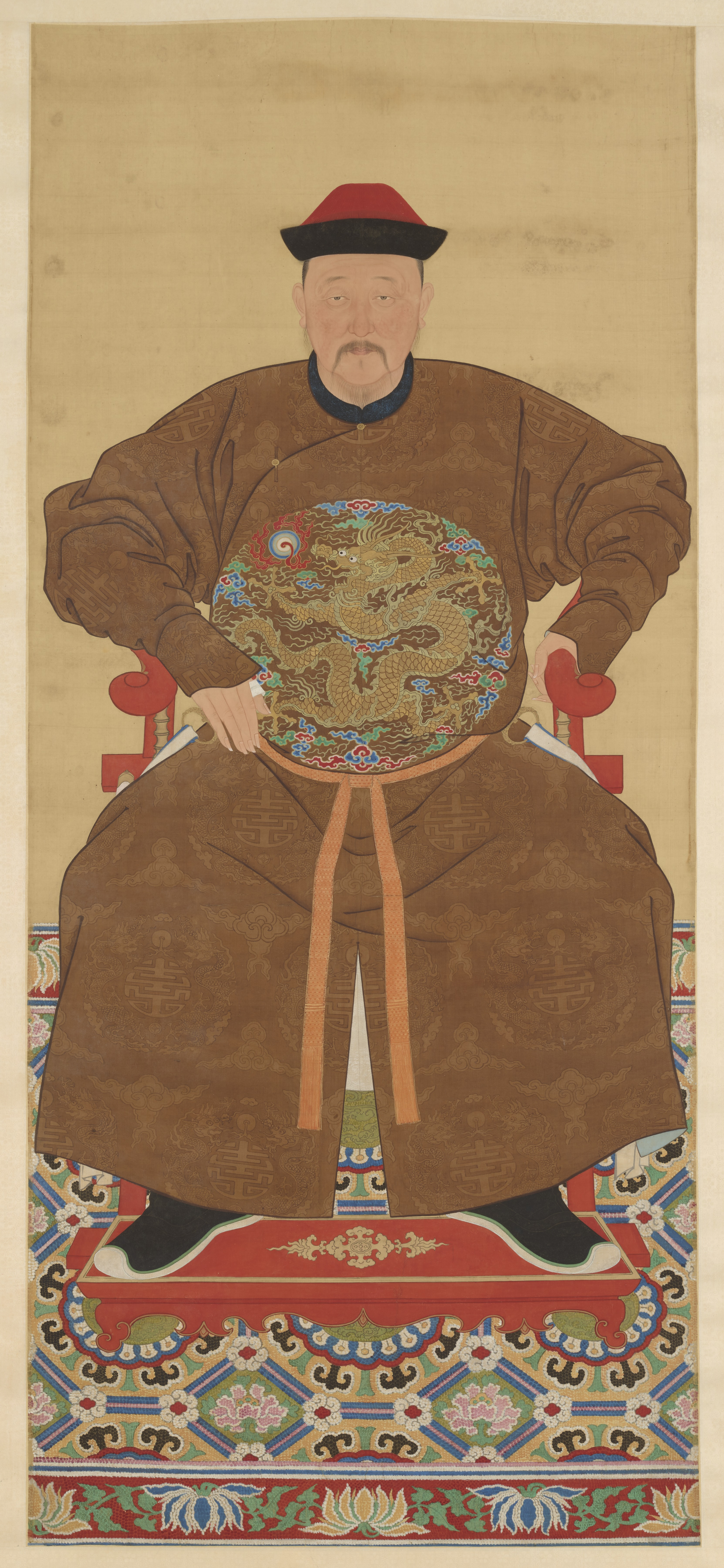
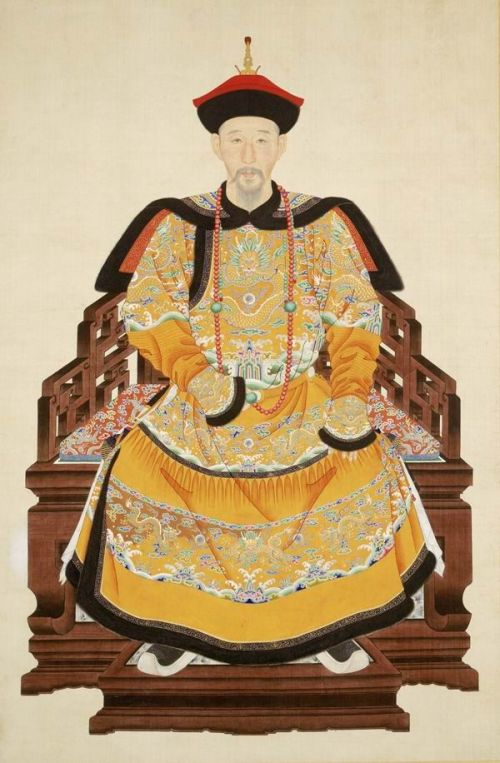
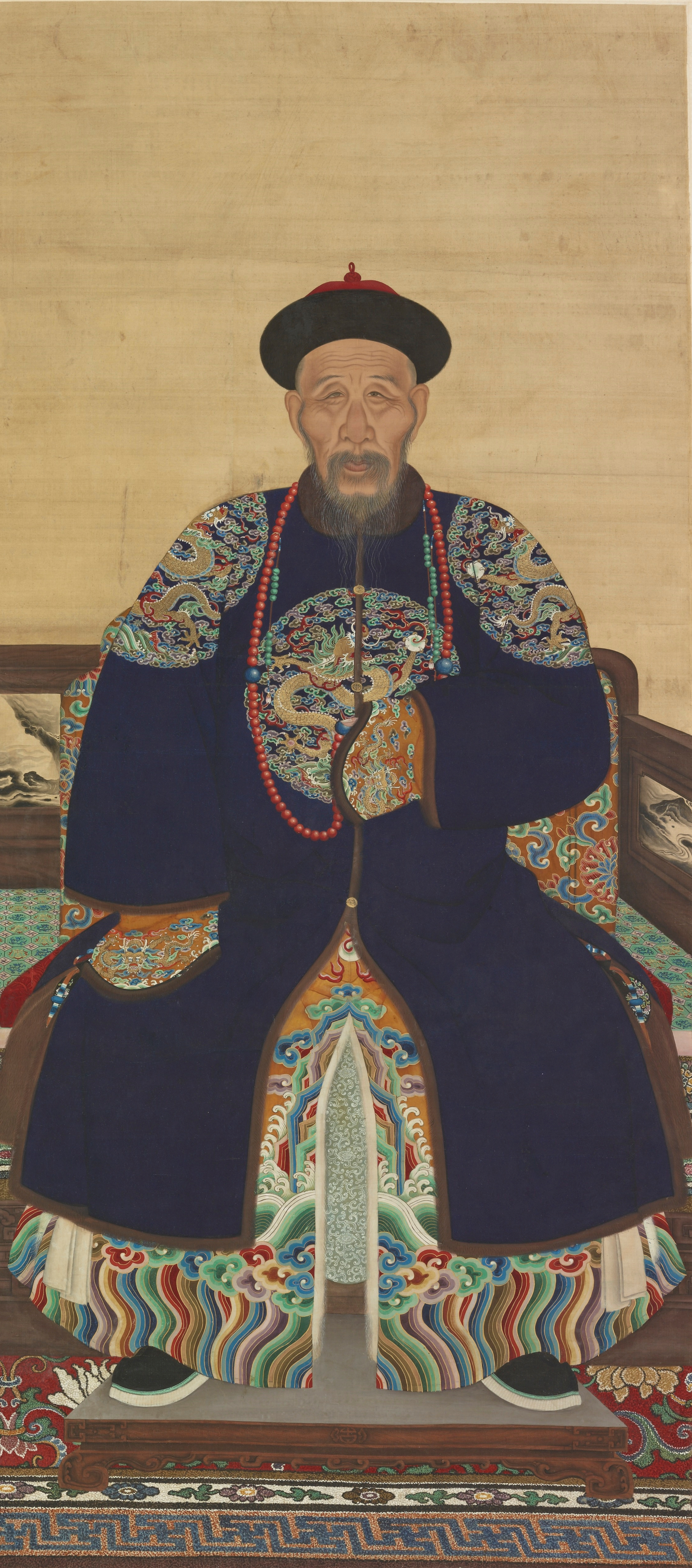
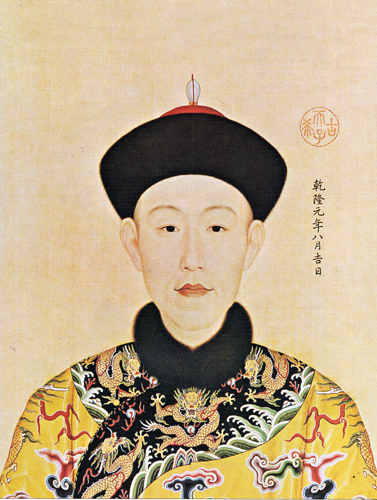
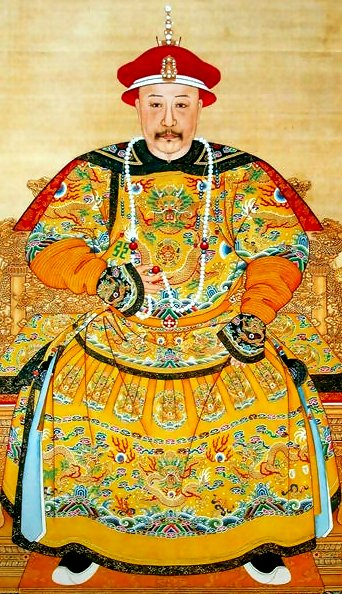
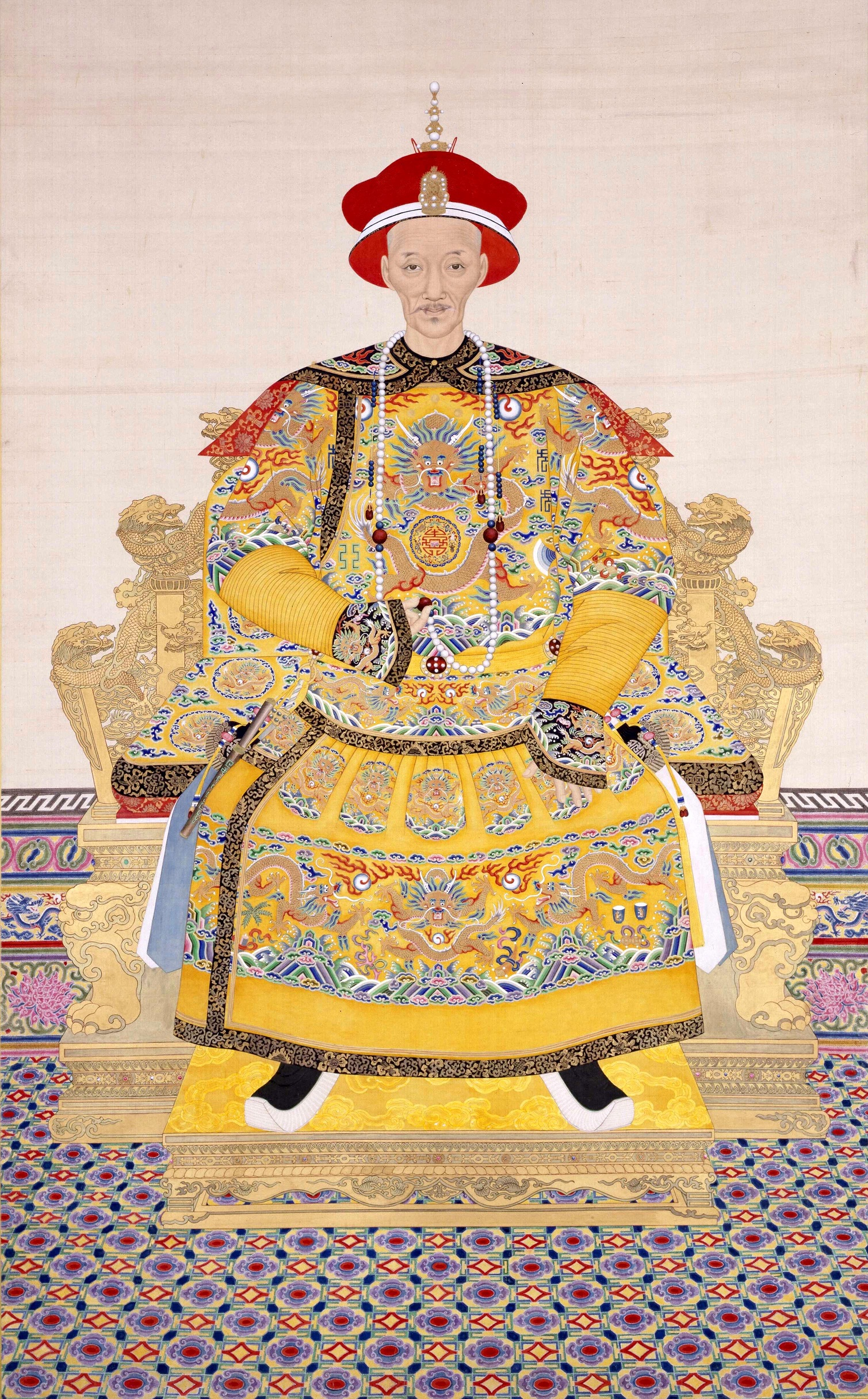
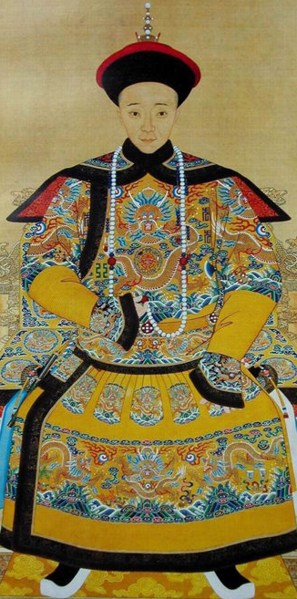
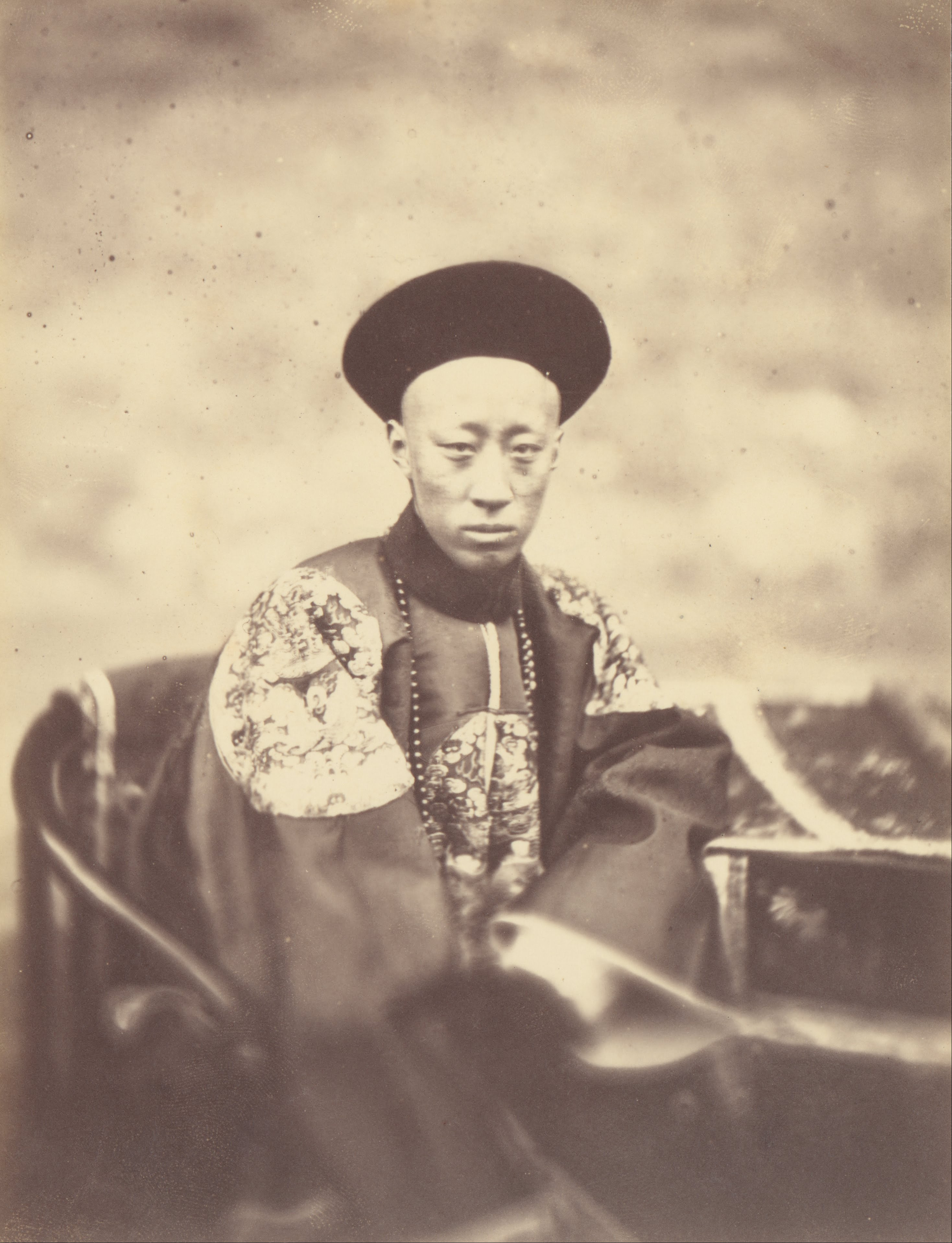
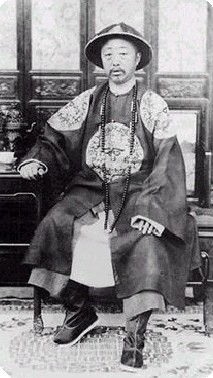
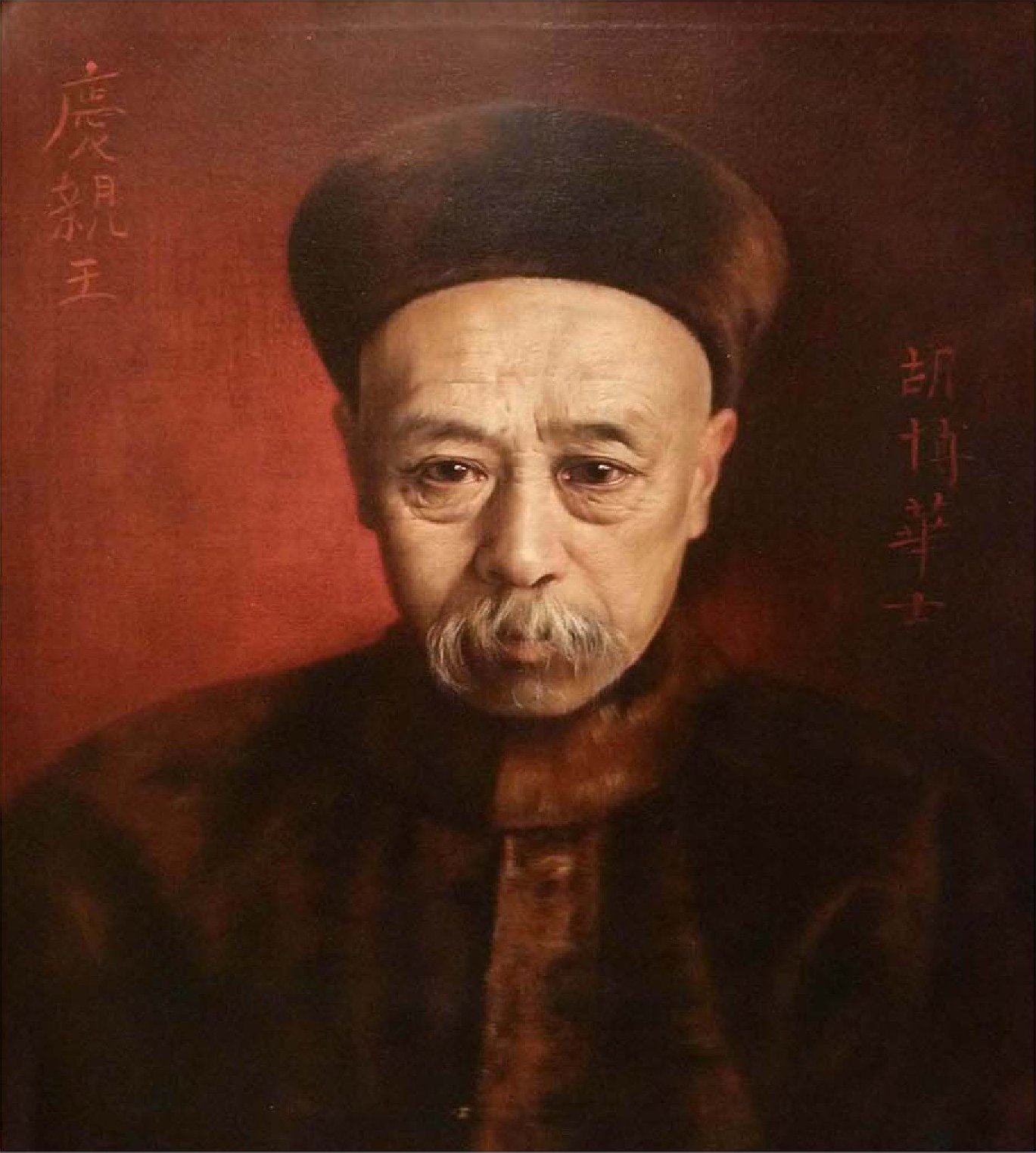
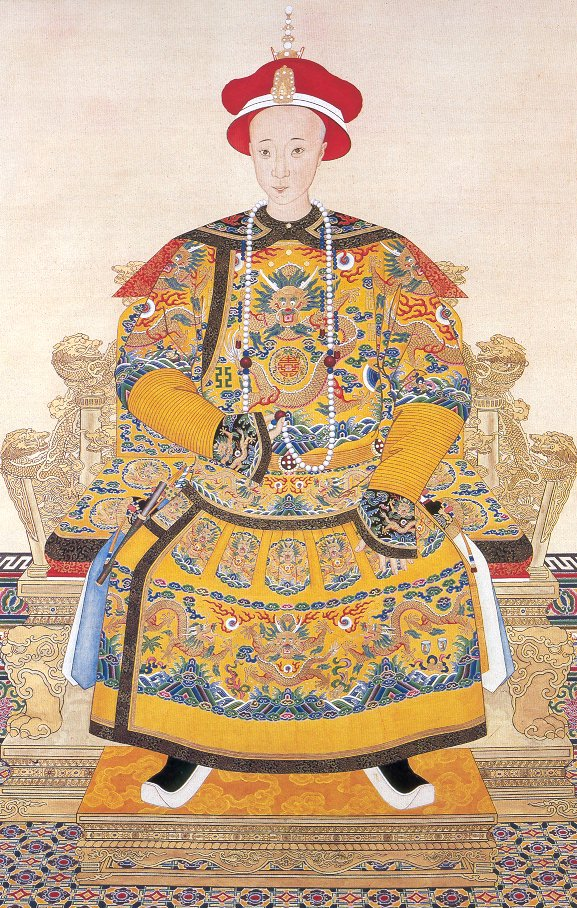
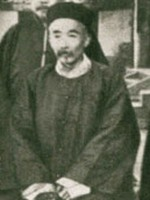
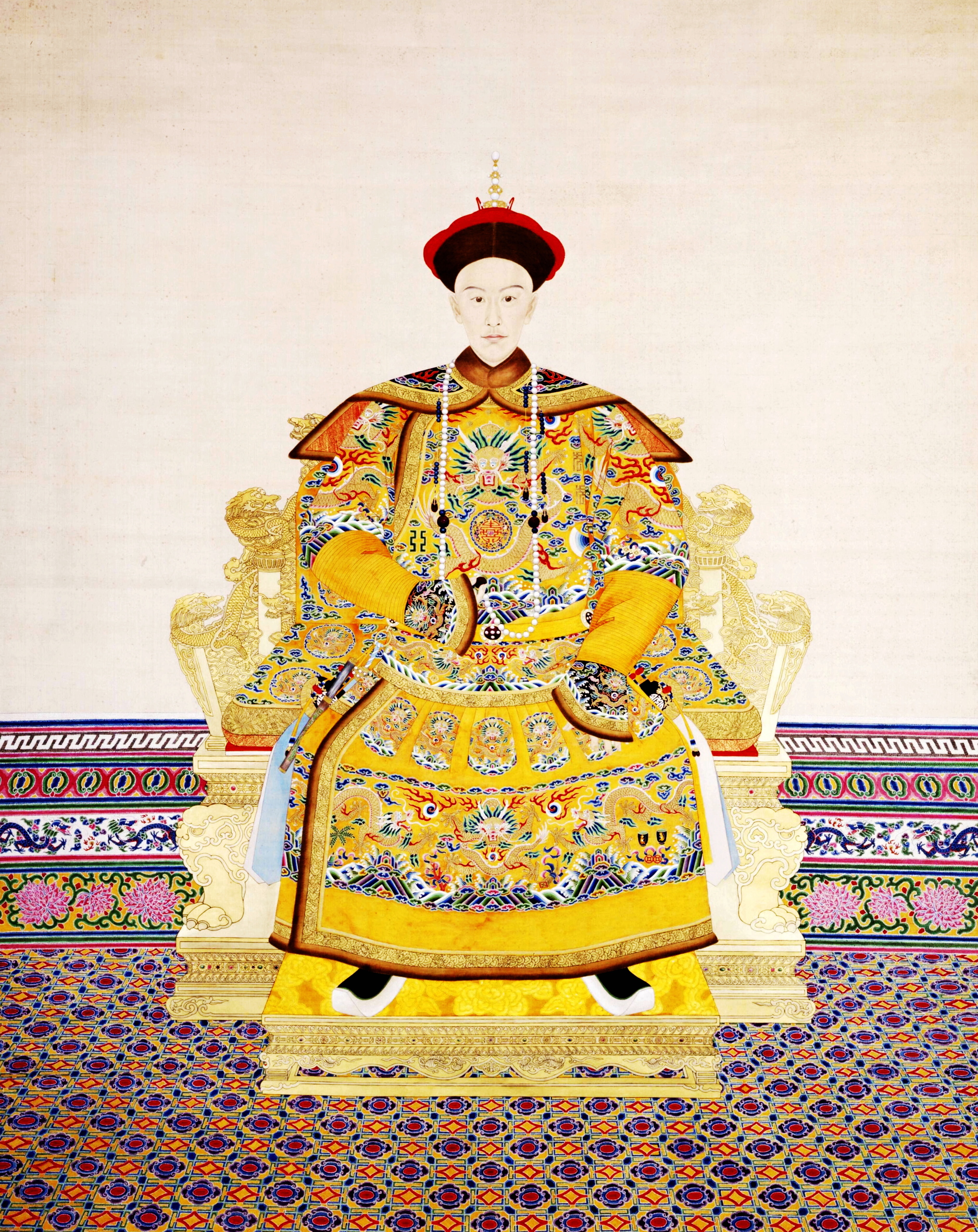
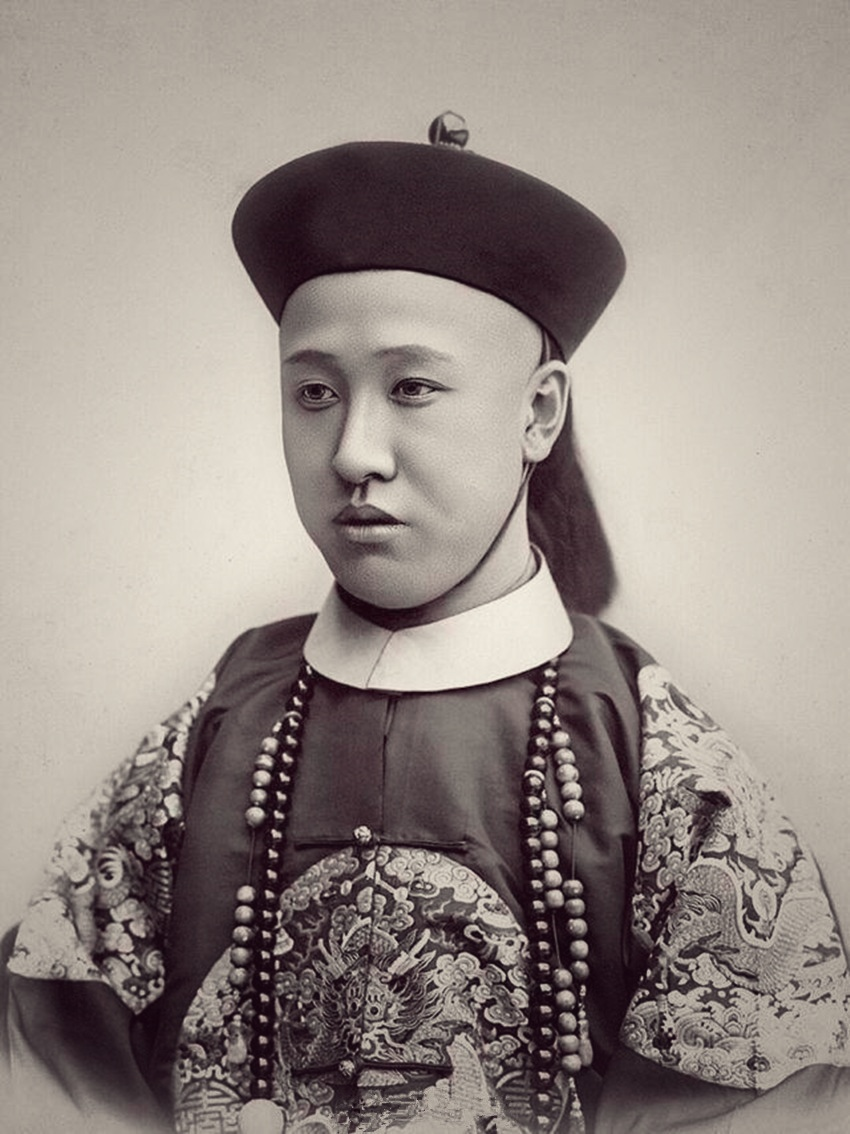
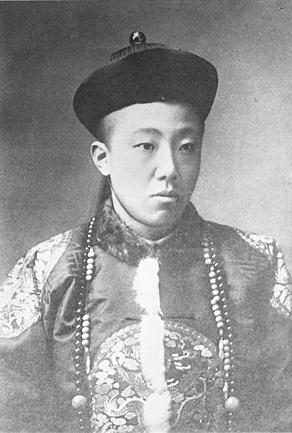
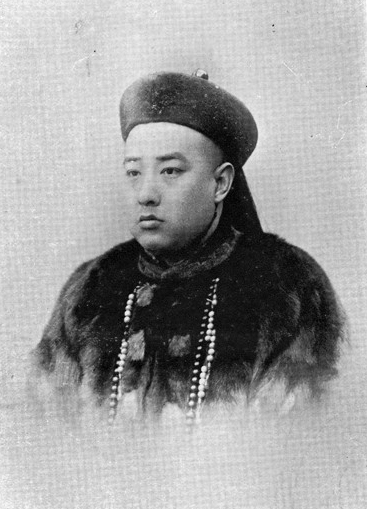
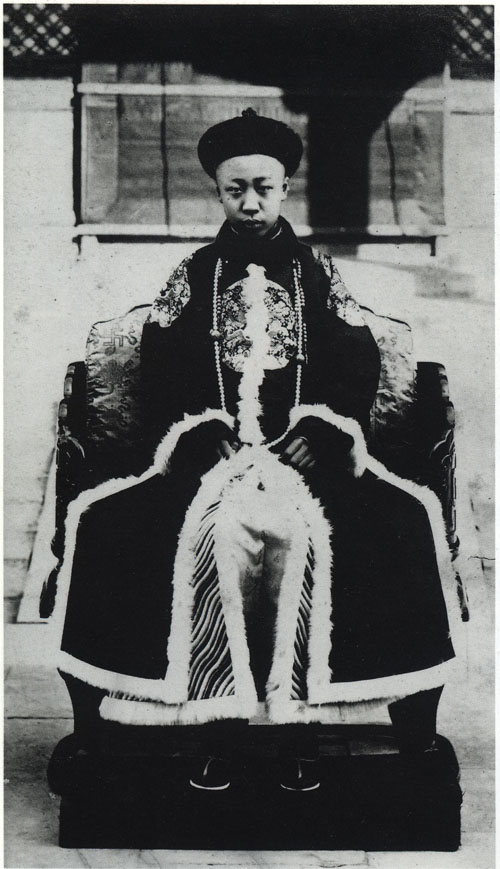
Giocangga 覺昌安 d.1582
Taksi 塔克世 d. 1583 "Xianzu" 顯祖
1	3
**Nurhaci** 努爾哈赤; 1559–1626 **Taizu** 太祖 r. 1616–1626	Šurhaci 舒爾哈齊; 1564–1611; Prince Zhuang of the First Rank 莊親王
1	2	7	8	12	13	14	15	6
Cuyen 褚英; 1580–1615 Crown Prince; Guanglue 廣略太子	Daišan 代善; 1583–1648 Prince Li Lie of the First Rank 禮烈親王	Abatai 阿巴泰; 1589–1646; Prince Rao Yu of the Second Rank	**Hong Taiji** 皇太極; 1592–1643 **Taizong** 太宗 r. 1626–1643	Ajige 阿濟格; 1605–1651; Prince Ying of the First Rank	Laimbu 賴慕布; 1612–1646; Bulwark Duke 輔國公	Dorgon 多爾袞; 1612–1650 Prince Rui Zhong of the First Rank 睿忠親王	Dodo 多鐸; 1614–1649 Prince Yu Tong of the First Rank 豫通親王	Jirgalang 濟爾哈朗; 1599–1655; Prince Zheng Xian of the First Rank 鄭獻親王
1	5	9
Yoto 岳托; 1599–1639; Prince Keqin of the Second Rank 克勤郡王	Sahaliyan 薩哈璘; 1604–1636; Prince Ying Yi of the First Rank 穎毅親王	Hooge 豪格; 1609–1647; Prince Su Wu of the First Rank 肅武親王	Shuosai 碩塞; 1627–1654; Prince Chengze Yu of the First Rank 承澤裕親王	Fulin 福臨; 1638–1661 **Shunzhi 順治**; Shizu 世祖 r. 1643–1644– –1661
3
Lekdehun 勒剋德渾; 1619–1652; Prince; Shuncheng Gonghui of the Second Rank 順承恭惠郡王	Xuanye 玄燁; 1654–1722 **Kangxi 康熙**; Shengzu 聖祖 r. 1661–1722
1	2	3	4	8	9	13	14
Yunzhi; 1672–1734; Prince Zhi of the Second Rank 直郡王	Yinreng 胤礽; 1674–1725 Prince Li Mi of the First Rank 理密親王	Yinzhi 胤祉; 1677–1732 Prince Cheng Yin of the First Rank 誠隱親王	Yinzhen 胤禛; 1678–1735 **Yongzheng** **雍正**; Shizong 世宗 r. 1723–1735	Yinsi 胤禩 1681–1726	Yuntang 允禟 1683–1726	Yinxiang 胤祥; 1686–1730 Prince Yi Xian of the First Rank 怡賢親王	Yinti 胤禵; 1688–1756 Prince Xun Qin of the Second; Rank 恂勤郡王
4
Hongli 弘曆; 1711–1799 **Qianlong 乾隆**; Gaozong 高宗 r. 1735–1796
5	15	17
Yongqi 永琪; 1741–1766; Prince Rongchun of the First Rank 榮純親王	Yongyan 顒琰; 1760–1820 **Jiaqing 嘉慶**; Renzong 仁宗 r. 1796–1820	Yonglin 永璘; 1766–1820; Prince Qingxi of the First Rank 慶僖親王
2	3	4
Minning 旻寧; 1782–1850 **Daoguang 道光**; Xuanzong 宣宗 r. 1820–1850	Miankai 綿愷; Prince Dun of the First Rank; 1795–1838	Mianxin 綿忻; Prince Rui of the First Rank; 1805–1828	Mianxing 綿性; Fuguo Gong 輔國公
4	5	6	7	1
Yizhu 奕詝; 1831–1861 **Xianfeng 咸豐**; Wenzong 文宗 r. 1850–1861	Yicong 奕誴; 1831–1889; Prince Dunke of the First Rank 惇恪親王	Yixin 奕訢; 1833–1898 Prince Gongzhong of the First Rank 恭忠親王	Yixuan 奕譞; 1840–1891 Prince Chunxian of the First Rank 醇賢親王	Yizhi 奕誌; 1827–1850	Yikuang 奕劻; 1838–1917 Prince Qingmi of the First Rank 慶密親王
1	2	1	5	7	1
Zaichun 載淳; 1856–1875 **Tongzhi 同治**; Muzong 穆宗 r. 1861–1875	Zaiyi 載漪; 1856–1922 Prince Duan of the Second Rank 端郡王	Zaitian 載湉; 1871–1908 **Guangxu 光緒**; Dezong 德宗 r. 1875–1908	Zaifeng 載灃; 1883–1951 Prince Chun of the First Rank 醇親王	Zaitao 載濤 1887–1970; Beile 貝勒	Zaizhen 載振; 1876–1947 Prince Qing of the First Rank
1	2	4
Puyi 溥儀; 1906–1967 **Xuantong** **宣統** r. 1908–1912	Pujie 溥傑; 1907–1994	Puren 溥任; 1918–2015
