= Zhu Changqing =

Zhu Changqing 朱常清

Regent of the Southern Ming dynasty
- Tenure: 1648

Prince of Huai
- Tenure: 1631–1648
- Predecessor: Zhu Yiju
- Successor: Zhu Yougui
- Born: Unknown
- Died: 1649
Names
- Zhu Changqing (朱常清)
Era name and dates
- Dongwu (東武): February – November 1648
- House: Zhu
- Dynasty: Southern Ming
- Father: Zhu Yiju

Zhu Changqing (Chinese: 朱常清; died 1649), Prince of Huai (淮王), courtesy name Xiaxin (霞新), was claimed to be regent of the Southern Ming dynasty from 1648 to 1649. His regnal name was "Dongwu" (東武), which means "east valiant".

Dongwu got full support from Koxinga (Zheng Chenggong), a famous and powerful warlord during that time. Dongwu's & Koxinga's power was based on Guandong and Fujian province.

Dongwu died in 1649 and was succeeded by Prince of Gui with the era name "Yongli" (永曆). According to the history book, he has no temple name.

Zhu Changqing House of Zhu Died: 1649
Chinese royalty
Preceded by Zhu Yiju	Prince of Huai; 1631–1649	Succeeded by Zhu Yougui
