= Shaowu Emperor =

Emperor of Southern Ming from 1646 to 1647

Shaowu Emperor 紹武帝

Emperor of the Southern Ming dynasty
- Reign: 11 December 1646 – 20 January 1647
- Predecessor: Longwu Emperor
- Successor: Yongli Emperor

Prince of Tang
- Tenure: 1645–1646
- Predecessor: Zhu Yujian
- Successor: Zhu Yu'e
- Born: 1605
- Died: 20 January 1647 (aged 41–42)
- Burial: Graveyard of the Shaowu Emperor and his Ministers (紹武君臣冢), Mukegang, Yuexiu Hill, Guangzhou
Names
- Zhu Yuyue (朱聿鐭)
Era dates
- Shaowu (紹武)
- House: Zhu
- Dynasty: Southern Ming
- Father: Zhu Qisheng
- Mother: Lady Mao

Zhu Yuyue (Chinese: 朱聿鐭; pinyin: Zhū Yùyuè; 1605 – 20 January 1647), the Prince of Tang (Chinese: 唐王; pinyin: Táng Wáng), reigned as the Shaowu Emperor (Chinese: 紹武帝; pinyin: Shàowǔ Dì) of the Southern Ming dynasty from 1646 to 1647.

== Life ==
He was a descendant of the first Ming emperor Zhu Yuanzhang. Before ascending to the throne he followed his father as the Prince of Tang and elder brother, the future Longwu Emperor, their fief being situated in Nanyang prefecture, in Henan province. In 1646 he succeeded the title of Prince of Tang after the accession of the Longwu Emperor.

When Qing forces captured Fuzhou in early October 1646 and killed the Longwu Emperor, he fled to Guangzhou. That December, at the behest of several high officials, he ascended to the Ming throne in Guangzhou, taking the reign title "Shaowu" (紹武; pinyin: Shàowǔ), just a few days before the Prince of Gui became the Yongli Emperor.

Both regimes claimed to be the legitimate successor of the Ming dynasty, and war broke out shortly afterwards. Initially, forces of the Shaowu regime enjoyed victory over the Yongli forces. This ultimately led to the overconfidence of the Shaowu Emperor. Corruption and lack of defense doomed the government. Just 40 days after the establishment of the Shaowu regime, Qing forces successfully invaded Guangzhou. The Shaowu Emperor was captured in January 1647 and immediately committed suicide.

The remains of the Shaowu Emperor and his officials are buried in Yuexiu Park, Guangzhou.

Shaowu Emperor House of Zhu Born: 1605 Died: 20 January 1647
Chinese royalty
Preceded by Zhu Yujian	Prince of Tang; 1645–1646	Succeeded by Zhu Yu'e
Regnal titles
Preceded by Longwu Emperor	Emperor of the Southern Ming dynasty 1646–1647	Succeeded by Yongli Emperor
