= List of vassal prince peerages of the Ming dynasty =

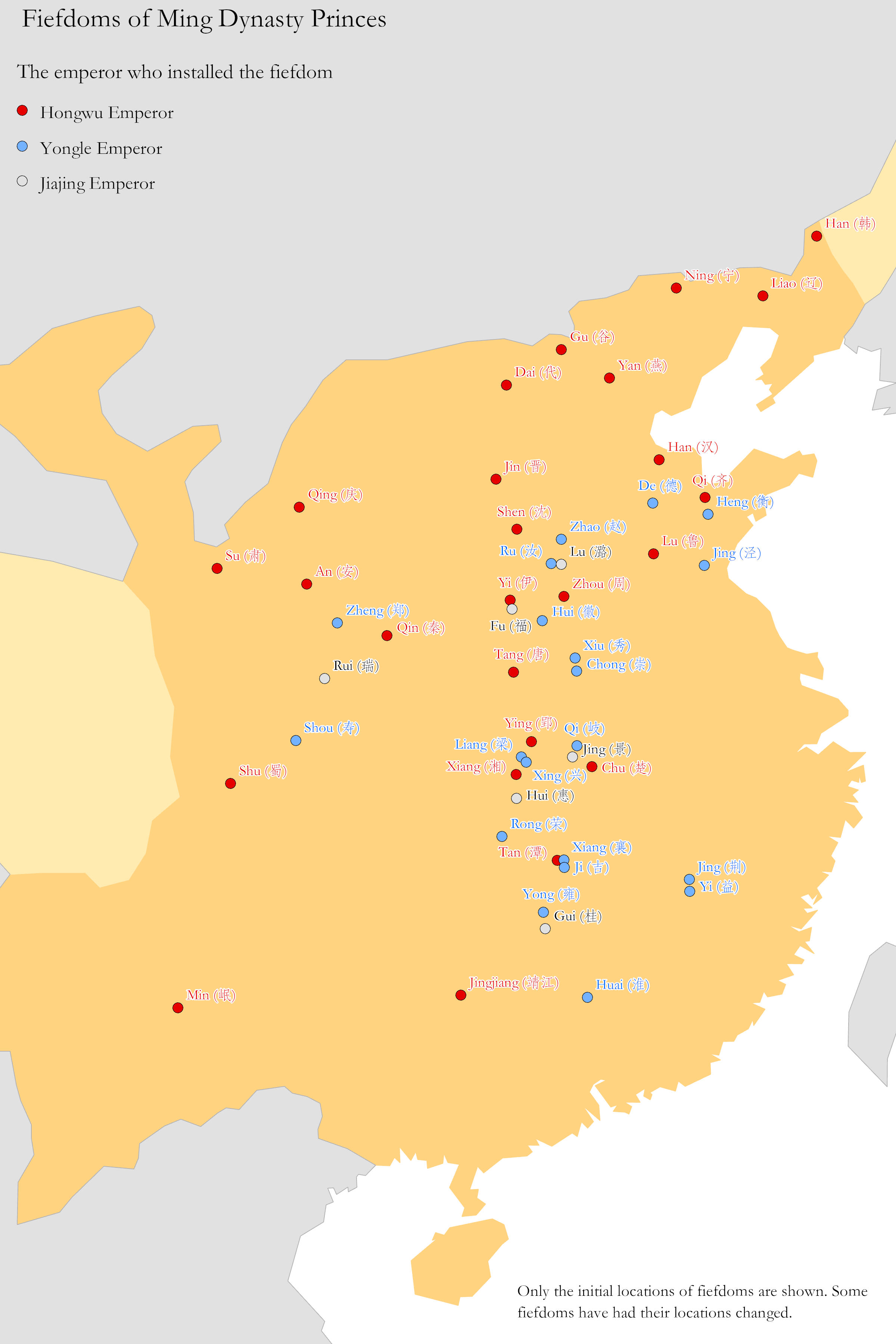
Locations of the fiefdoms of Ming princes

After Zhu Yuanzhang (Hongwu Emperor) founded the Ming dynasty, he designated his eldest son, Zhu Biao, as crown prince, and enfeoffed all of his other sons and a grandnephew as vassal princes. Fiefs of nine of these princes were located at frontier regions for defense. Hongwu Emperor also posthumously bestowed his late patrilineal and matrilineal relatives with princely titles.

This article shows all princes of Ming dynasty, including non-actual princes (male imperial members and nobles had no title).

== Forefathers of House of Zhu ==
For convenience of showing relationships of these imperial princes and emperors, this text will show the forefathers of Hongwu Emperor and their sons.

Birth name	Spouse	Temple name	Posthumous name	Birth & death dates	Issue
Zhu Zhongba 朱仲八	Madam Chen 陳氏	None		? -?	Zhu Liu'er; Zhu Shi'er; Zhu Bailiu, Emperor Xuan
Zhu Bailiu 朱百六	Empress Xuan 玄皇后	Dezu 德祖	Xuan 玄	? -?	Zhu Siwu; Zhu Sijiu, Emperor
Zhu Sijiu 朱四九	Empress Heng 恆皇后	Yizu 懿祖	Heng 恆	? -?	Zhu Chuyi, Emperor Yu; Zhu Chu'er; Zhu Chuwu; Zhu Chushi
Zhu Chuyi 朱初一	Empress Yu 裕皇后	Xizu 熙祖	Yu 裕	? -?	Zhu Wuyi, Prince of Shouchun; Zhu Wu'er; A premature died son Zhu Shizhen, Emperor Chun
Zhu Shizhen 朱世珍; Zhu Wusi 朱五四	Empress Chun 淳皇后	Renzu 仁祖	Chun 淳	1281 - 1344	Zhu Xinglong, Prince of Nanchang (grandfather of Zhu Shouqian); Zhu Xingsheng, Prince of Xuyi; Zhu Xingzu, Prince of Linhuai; Zhu Fonǚ (朱佛女), Princess Caoguo (曹國公主) (paternal grandmother of Li Jinglong); Princess Taiyuan (太原公主); Hongwu Emperor

== Numbers of actual peerages ==
=== First rank princely peerages ===
- Hongwu Emperor's line: 25 peerages (including Prince of Jingjiang); two were absorbed into the crown (Yongle Emperor and Southern Ming Longwu Emperor), seven were abolished, and two had no heir
- Zhu Biao's line: three peerages, all of them abolished
- Yongle Emperor's line: two peerages
- Hongxi Emperor's line: eight peerages; four had no heir
- Xuande Emperor's line: one peerage, absorbed into the crown (Jingtai Emperor)
- Emperor Yingzong's line: eight peerages, one absorbed into the crown (Chenghua Emperor); three had no heir
- Chenghua Emperor's line: ten peerages; one was absorbed into the crown (Jiajing Emperor), six had no heir
- Jiajing Emperor's line: two peerages, one absorbed into the crown (Longqing Emperor), one had no heir
- Longqing Emperor's line: one peerage
- Wanli Emperor's line: four peerages, two peerages absorbed into the Southern Ming crown (Hongguang Emperor and Yongli Emperor)
- Taichang Emperor's line: one peerage, absorbed into the crown (Chongzhen Emperor)
- Chongzhen Emperor's line: two peerages, both of them abolished

=== By Southern Ming ===
- By Longwu Emperor: Three peerages, two from the line of the Prince of Tang, one from the cadet peerage of the line of the Prince of Yi
- By Zhu Yihai: one peerage, from the cadet peerage of the line of Prince of Ning

== List of actual princely peerages ==
=== By Hongwu Emperor ===
- Prince of Qin (inherited)
- Prince of Jin (晉) (inherited)
- Prince of Yan (absorbed into crown)
- Prince of Zhou (inherited)
- Prince of Chu (inherited)
- Prince of Qi (abolished)
- Prince of Tan (heirless)
- Prince of Lu (鲁) (inherited)
- Prince of Jingjiang (inherited)
- Prince of Shu (inherited)
- Prince of Xiang (湘) (heirless)
- Prince of Dai (inherited)
- Prince of Su (inherited)
- Prince of Liao (inherited)
- Prince of Qing (inherited)
- Prince of Ning (inherited)
- Prince of Min (inherited)
- Prince of Gu (abolished)
- Prince of Han (韩) (inherited)
- Prince of Shen (inherited)
- Prince of An (heirless)
- Prince of Tang (inherited)
- Prince of Ying (heirless)
- Prince of Yi (inherited)

=== By Jianwen Emperor ===
- Prince of Wu (demoted to Comm. Prince of Guangze, not inherited)
- Prince of Heng (demoted to Comm. Prince of Huai'en, no heir)
- Prince of Xu (徐) (demoted to Comm. Prince of Fuhui and Comm. Prince of Ouning, no heir)

=== By Yongle Emperor ===
- Prince of Han (漢) (second creation, abolished)
- Prince of Zhao (second creation, inherited)

=== By Hongxi Emperor ===
- Prince of Zheng (inherited)
- Prince of Yue (no heir)
- Prince of Xiang (inherited)
- Prince of Jing (荊) (inherited)
- Prince of Huai (inherited)
- Prince of Teng (no heir)
- Prince of Liang (no heir)
- Prince of Wei (no heir)

=== By Xuande Emperor ===
- Prince of Cheng (absorbed into the crown)

=== By Emperor Yingzong ===
- Prince of De (inherited)
- Prince of Xu (許) (no heir)
- Prince of Xiu (no heir)
- Prince of Chong (inherited)
- Prince of Ji (inherited)
- Prince of Xin (忻) (no heir)
- Prince of Hui (徽) (inherited)

=== By Jingtai Emperor ===
- Prince of Yi (沂) (absorbed into the crown: Chenghua Emperor)

=== By Chenghua Emperor ===
- Prince of Xing (inherited and absorbed into the crown: Jiajing Emperor)
- Prince of Qi (岐) (no heir)
- Prince of Yi (益) (inherited)
- Prince of Heng (second creation) (inherited)
- Prince of Yong (雍) (no heir)
- Prince of Shou (no heir)
- Prince of Ru (no heir)
- Prince of Jing (涇) (no heir)
- Prince of Rong (second creation) (inherited)
- Prince of Shen (no heir)

=== By Jiajing Emperor ===
- Prince of Yu (absorbed into the crown: Longqing Emperor)
- Prince of Jing (景) (no heir)

=== By Longqing Emperor ===
- Prince of Lu (潞) (inherited)

=== By Wanli Emperor ===
- Prince of Fu (inherited and absorbed into the crown: Hongguang Emperor)
- Prince of Rui (inherited)
- Prince of Hui (惠) (inherited)
- Prince of Gui (inherited)

=== By Taichang Emperor ===
- Prince of Xin (信) (absorbed into the crown: Chongzhen Emperor)

=== By Chongzhen Emperor ===
- Prince of Ding (abolished)
- Prince of Yong (永) (abolished)

== Posthumous imperial princes and untitled imperial princes ==
After the Hongwu Emperor was enthroned, he posthumously honored and bestowed on his brothers and patrilineal relatives various second-rank princely titles. Also, some imperial sons who died prematurely were posthumously bestowed with first-rank princely titles, but some of them also had not posthumous titles, too. Below shows all of the posthumous princes of the imperial house, including descendants of Zhu Biao and Southern Ming princes, but excluding matrilineal relatives of the Hongwu Emperor and other nobles, as they cannot be considered members of the imperial house.

- Note: Bold names refer to persons with a posthumous title and imperial princes without title.

=== Line of Hongwu Emperor patrilineal relatives ===
- Zhu Zhongba, oldest known paternal ancestor of the dynasty
  - Zhu Liu'er (朱六二), Zhu Zhongba's eldest son
  - Zhu Qianshi (朱千十), Zhu Zhongba's second son
  - Zhu Bailiu (朱百六), Zhu Zhongba's third son, "Emperor Dezu Xuan" (德祖玄皇帝).
    - Zhu Siwu (朱四五), Zhu Bailiu's eldest son
    - Zhu Sijiu (朱四九), Zhu Bailiu's second son, "Emperor Yizu Heng" (懿祖恆皇帝).
      - Zhu Chuyi (朱初一), Zhu Sijiu's eldest son, "Emperor Xizu Yu" (熙祖裕皇帝).
        - Zhu Wuyi (朱五一), Zhu Chongyi's eldest son, "Prince of Shouchun" (壽春王).
          - Zhu Chongyi (朱重一), Zhu Wuyi's eldest son, "Prince of Huoqiu" (霍丘王).
            - Zhu Saige (朱賽哥), Zhu Chongyi's eldest son, "Prince of Gaosha" (高沙王).
            - Zhu Tiege (朱鐵哥), Zhu Chongyi's second son "Prince of Shouchun" (壽春王).
          - Zhu Chong'er (朱重二), Zhu Wuyi's second son, "Prince of Baoying" (寶應王).
          - Zhu Chongsan (朱重三), Zhu Wuyi's third son, "Prince of Anfeng" (安豐王).
            - Zhu Zhuan'er (朱轉兒), Zhu Chongsan's eldest son, "Prince of Liu'an" (六安王).
            - Zhu Ji'er (朱記兒), Zhu Chongsan's second son, "Prince of Lai'an" (來安王).
            - Zhu Sao'er (朱臊兒), Zhu Chongsan's third son, "Prince of Dumeng" (都蒙王).
            - Zhu Run'er (朱潤兒), Zhu Chongsan's fourth son, "Prince of Yingshan" (英山王).
          - Zhu Chongsi (朱重四), Zhu Wuyi's fourth son, "Prince of Mengcheng" (蒙城王).
        - Zhu Wu'er (朱五二), Zhu Chuyi's second son
        - Zhu Shizhen (朱世珍), Zhu Chuyi's second son, named Zhu Wusi (朱五四) during his lifetime, "Emperor Renzu Chun" (仁祖淳皇帝).
          - Siblings of Hongwu Emperor (see below)
      - Zhu Chu'er (朱初二), Zhu Sijiu's second son
      - Zhu Chuwu (朱初五), also name Zhu Xiao (朱孝), Zhu Sijiu's third son
      - Zhu Chushi (朱初十), Zhu Sijiu's fourth son

=== Line of Hongwu Emperor's brothers ===
- Zhu Shizhen, "Emperor Renzu Chun"
  - Zhu Xinglong (朱興隆; died 1344), Zhu Shizhen's eldest son, named Zhu Chongwu (朱重五) during his lifetime, "Prince of Yuzhang" (豫章王), later changed to "Prince of Nanchang" (南昌王)
    - Zhu Shengbao (朱聖保), Zhu Xinglong's eldest son, "Prince of Shanyang" (山陽王).
    - Zhu Wenzheng (朱文正; died 1365), Zhu Xinglong's second son
      - Zhu Shouqian, Prince of Jingjiang
  - Zhu Xingsheng (朱興盛), Zhu Shizhen's second son, named Zhu Chongliu (朱重六) during his lifetime, "Prince of Xuyi" (盱眙王).
    - Zhu Wang'er (朱旺兒), posthumously bestowed as "Prince of Zhaoxin" (昭信王).
  - Zhu Xingzu (朱興祖), Zhu Shizhen's eldest son named Zhu Chongqin (朱重七) during his lifetime, "Prince of Linhuai" (臨淮王).
  - Hongwu Emperor, Zhu Shizhen's fourth son

=== Imperial princes without title ===
- Hongwu Emperor
  - Zhu Biao, Crown Prince Yiwen, Hongwu Emperor's eldest son
    - Zhu Xiongying (朱雄英), Zhu Biao's eldest son, "Prince Huai of Yu" (虞懷王)
    - Jianwen Emperor, Zhu Biao's second son
      - Zhu Wengui (朱文圭), Jianwen Emperor's second son, "Prince Huai of Run" (潤懷王)
  - Yongle Emperor
    - Hongxi Emperor
      - Xuande Emperor
        - Emperor Yingzong
          - Chenghua Emperor
            - Unnamed eldest son of Chenghua Emperor
            - Hongzhi Emperor
              - Zhu Houwei (朱厚煒), "Prince Dao of Wei" (蔚悼王), Hongzhi Emperor's second son
            - Zhu Youyuan, Chenghua Emperor's fourth son
              - Zhu Houxi (朱厚熙), Zhu Youyuan's eldest son, Prince Huai of Yue (岳懷王)
              - Jiajing Emperor
                - Longqing Emperor
                  - Zhu Yiling (朱翊鈴), Longqing Emperor's second son, "Comm. Prince of Lantian" (藍田郡王), later changed to "Prince Dao of Jing" (靖悼王)
                  - Wanli Emperor
                    - Taichang Emperor
                      - Zhu Youxue (朱由㰒), Taichang Emperor's second son, "Prince Huai of Jian" (簡懷王)
                      - Zhu Youji (朱由楫), Taichang Emperor's third son, "Prince Si of Qi" (齊思王)
                      - Zhu Youmo (朱由模), Taichang Emperor's fourth son, "Prince Hui of Huai" (懷惠王)
                      - Chongzhen Emperor
                        - Zhu Cixuan (朱慈烜), Chongzhen Emperor's fifth son, "Prince Yin of Huai" (懷隱王)
                        - Zhu Cican (朱慈燦), Chongzhen Emperor's sixth son, "Prince Huai of Dao" (悼懷王)
                        - Chongzhen Emperor's seventh son, "Prince Liang of Dao" (悼良王)
                      - Zhu Youyi (朱由栩), Taichang Emperor's sixth son, "Prince Huai of Xiang" (湘懷王)
                      - Zhu Youshan (朱由橏), Taichang Emperor's seventh son, "Prince Zhao of Hui" (慧昭王)
                    - Zhu Changxu (朱常漵), Wanli Emperor's second son, "Prince Ai of Bin" (邠哀王)
                    - Zhu Changzhi (朱常治), Wanli Emperor's fourth son, "Prince Huai of Yuan" (沅懷王)
                    - Zhu Changpu (朱常溥), Wanli Emperor's eighth son, "Prince Si of Yong" (永思王)
                - Zhu Zailu (朱載𪉖), Jiajing Emperor's fifth son, "Prince Shang of Ying" (潁殤王)
                - Zhu Zai... (朱載), Jiajing Emperor's sixth son, "Prince Huai of Qi" (戚懷王)
                - Zhu Zaikui (朱載㙺), Jiajing Emperor's seventh son, "Prince Ai of Ji" (薊哀王)
                - Zhu Zai... (朱載), Jiajing Emperor's eighth son, Prince Si of Jun (均思王)
            - Unnamed tenth son of Chenghua Emperor
          - Zhu Jianshi (朱見湜), Emperor Yingzong's third son
      - Zhu Zhanyin (朱瞻垠), Hongxi Emperor's fourth son, "Comm. Prince of Jingle" (靜樂郡王), later changed to "Prince Xian of Qi" (蘄獻王)
    - Zhu Gaoxi (朱高爔), Yongle Emperor's fourth son
  - Zhu Nan (朱楠), Hongwu Emperor's 26th son

== Non-imperial princes ==
According to the regulation of the Ming dynasty, only imperial sons and other imperial clan members (excluding matrilineal relatives of the imperial house) can award princely titles. For non-imperial and nobles (excluding matrilineal relatives of the imperial house), the highest rank title that could be awarded was "duke" (國公), they could only posthumously awarded the second-rank princely title after they died. This regulation was carried out until the extinction of the Ming dynasty, and regimes of Hongguang Emperor and Longwu Emperor. During the reign of Yongli Emperor, he abolished the regulation under the force of Sun Kewang and granted various princely titles to Sun Kewang, Li Dingguo, Zheng Chenggong (known as Koxinga) and other military officers of Southern Ming.

=== Posthumously bestowed in Ming dynasty ===
- Mr. Hou (侯), "Prince of Da" (大王), maternal great-great-grandfather of Hongwu Emperor
- Mr. Wang (王), "Prince of Gao" (高王), maternal great-grandfather of Hongwu Emperor
- Mr. Chen (陳), "Prince of Yang" (揚王), maternal grandfather of Hongwu Emperor
- Mr. Ma (馬). "Prince of Xu" (徐王), father of Empress Xiaocigao
- Guo Zixing, "Prince of Chuyang" (滁陽王)
- Xu Da, "Prince Wuning of Zhongshan" (中山武寧王), the first Duke of Wei (魏國公)
- Chen Youren (陳友仁), "Prince Kangshan" (康山王), fourth brother of Chen Youliang
- Chang Yuchun, "Prince Zhongwu of Kaiping" (開平忠武王)
- Tang He, "Prince Xiangwu of Dong'ou" (東甌襄武王), the first Duke of Xin (信國公)
- Deng Yu (鄧愈), "Prince Wushun of Ninghe" (寧河武順王), the first Duke of Wei (衛國公)
- Zhu Yong (朱永), "Prince Wuzhuang of Xuanping" (宣平武莊王), first Duke of Bao, and son-in-law of Zhang Fu

==== Dukedom of Cao line ====
- Li Zhen (李貞), "Prince Gongxian of Longxi" (隴西恭獻王), the first Duke of Cao (曹國公), husband of Zhu Fonu (sister of Hongwu Emperor)
  - Li Wenzhong (李文忠), "Prince Wujing of Qiyang" (岐陽武靖王), the second Duke of Cao, maternal nephew of Hongwu Emperor and father of Li Jinglong

==== Marquessate of Xiping line ====
- Mu Ying, "Prince Zhaojing of Qianning (黔寧昭靖王), the first Marquess of Xiping (西平侯)
  - Mu Sheng, "Prince Zhongjing of Dingyuan" (定遠忠敬王), the second Marquess of Xiping and later the first Duke of Qian (黔國公)

==== Dukedom of Ying line ====
- Zhang Yu (general), "Prince Zhongwu of Hejian" (河間忠武王), originally posthumously bestowed as "Duke of Rong" (榮國公)
  - Zhang Fu, "Prince Zhonglie of Dingxing" (定興忠烈王), the first Duke of Ying (英國公)
    - Zhang Mao (張懋), "Prince Gongjing of Ningyang (寧陽恭靖王), the second Duke of Ying

==== Dukedom of Cheng line ====
- Zhu Neng (朱能), "Prince Wulie of Dongping" (東平武烈王), the first Duke of Cheng (成國公)
  - Zhu Yong (朱勇), "Prince Wumin of Pingyin" (平陰武愍王), the second Duke of Cheng
    - Unknown generation
      - Zhu Xizhong (朱希忠), "Prince Gongjing of Dingxiang" (定襄恭靖王), the Duke of Cheng
