= Empress Dowager Ma (Southern Ming) =

Chinese empress dowager (1578–1669)

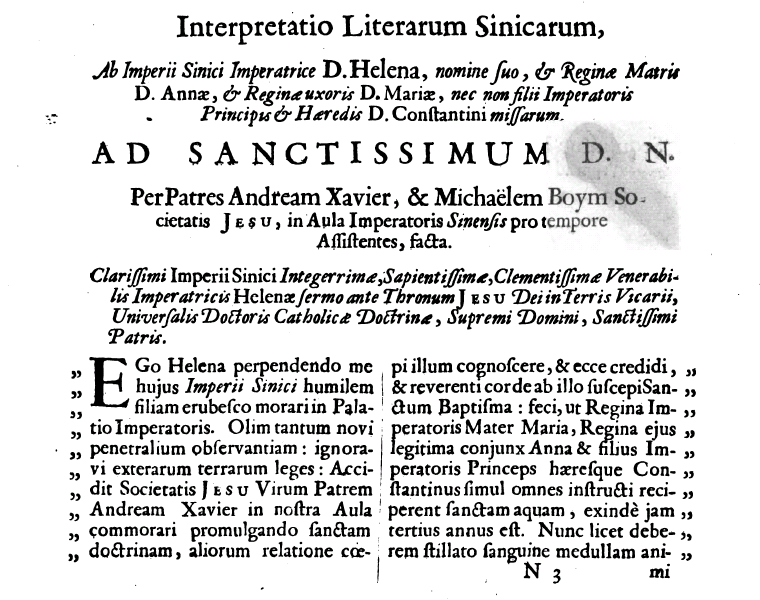
Letter from the Empress Dowager Wang (the "honorary mother" of the Yongli Emperor) to the Pope with a request for help. November 1650. Latin translation by Michał Boym.

Empress Dowager Ma (1578–1669), personal name unknown, formally known as Empress Dowager Zhaosheng (Chinese: 昭聖太后), was an empress dowager of the Chinese Southern Ming dynasty. She was a Sichuanese native and the birth mother of the Yongli Emperor. She converted to Roman Catholicism and adopted the name Maria.

== See also ==
- Catholic Church in China
- Catholic Church in Sichuan
