= List of emperors of the Ming dynasty =

Emperor of the Great Ming
- 大明皇帝
- Imperial
- Portrait of the Jiajing Emperor (r. 1521–1567) wearing a robe adorned with twelve dragons. The sun and moon drawn on the shoulders form the character ming ('bright'), the name of the dynasty. National Palace Museum, Taipei.

Details
- Style: Your Majesty, His Majesty the Emperor
- First monarch: Hongwu Emperor
- Last monarch: Chongzhen Emperor (Ming dynasty); Yongli Emperor (Southern Ming)
- Formed: 1368
- Abolished: 1644 (Ming dynasty); 1662 (Southern Ming)
- Residences: Ming Palace, Nanjing; Forbidden City, Beijing; Varies according to the Southern Ming regimes
- Appointer: Hereditary

The emperors of the Ming dynasty ruled over China proper from 1368 to 1644 during the late imperial era of China (960–1912). Members of the Ming dynasty continued to rule a series of rump states in southern China, commonly known as the Southern Ming, until 1662; the Ming dynasty succeeded the Mongol-led Yuan dynasty and preceded the Manchu-led Qing dynasty.

The Ming dynasty was founded by the peasant rebel leader Zhu Yuanzhang, known as the Hongwu Emperor. All Ming emperors were of the House of Zhu. The longest-reigning emperor of the dynasty was the Wanli Emperor (r. 1572–1620), who ruled for 48 years; the shortest was his successor, the Taichang Emperor, who ruled for only 29 days in 1620. The youngest ruler at the time of his ascension was Emperor Yingzong, who was only 9 years old, while the oldest ruler was the Hongwu Emperor, who died at the age of 71.

The emperor of the Ming dynasty, following a practice established in the Zhou dynasty, was known as the "Son of Heaven" (天子; Tiānzǐ). He was viewed as the intermediary between humans and heaven and was responsible for conducting numerous rituals to honor the supreme deities who safeguarded the empire. In addition, he participated in various ceremonies to commemorate significant events in both his own life and that of the empire. During audiences, his subjects were expected to demonstrate their submission by prostrating themselves before him, although the majority of decisions were actually made by the Grand Secretariat and the ministries. When he traveled, he was accompanied by an impressive entourage and protected by his imperial guard.

The majority of the Ming emperors resided in the Forbidden City, a 72 ha (180-acre) complex of palaces and buildings in Beijing. Prior to the Yongle Emperor, who moved the capital in 1420, the emperor's residence was located in a similar complex in Nanjing.

== Background ==
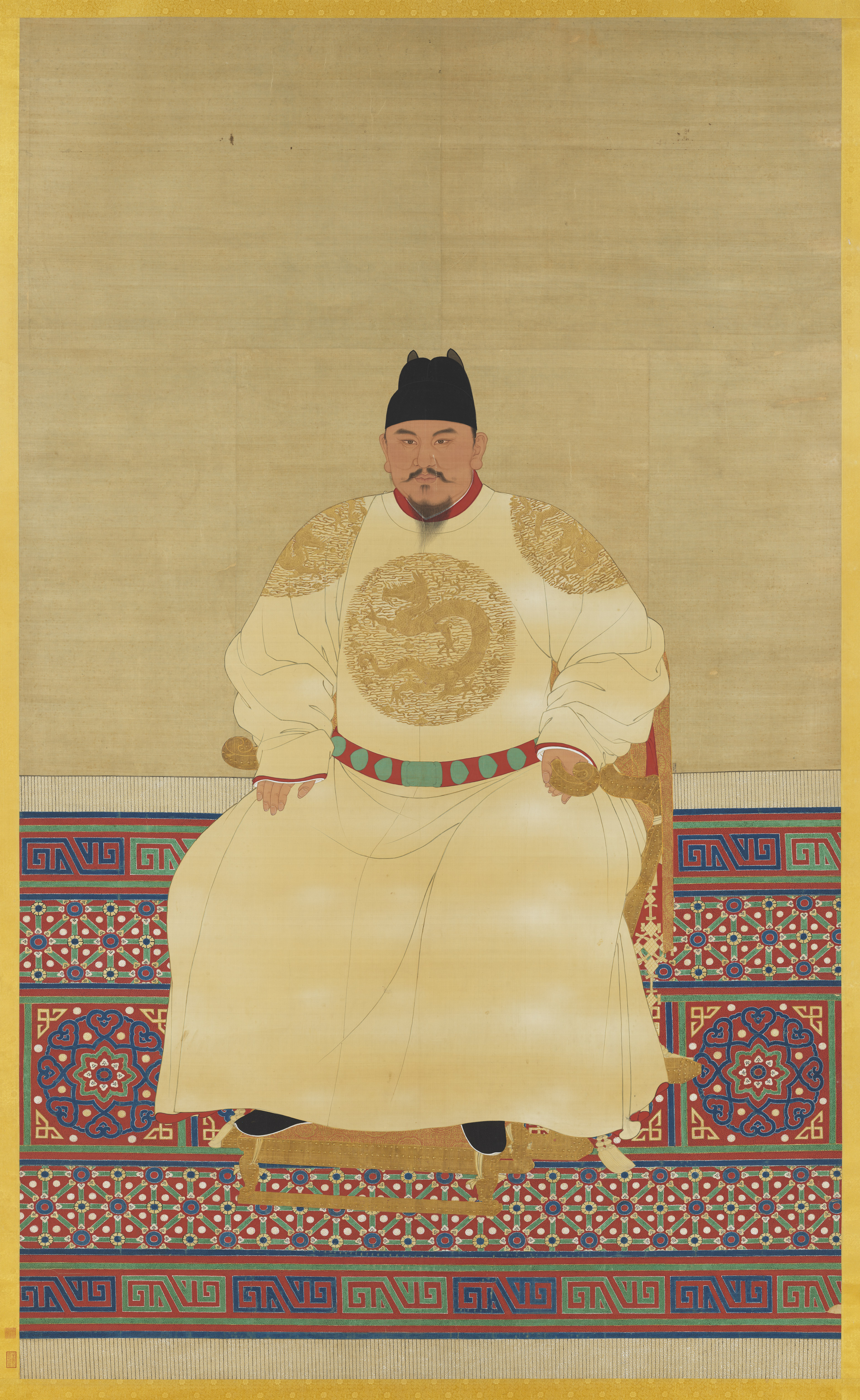
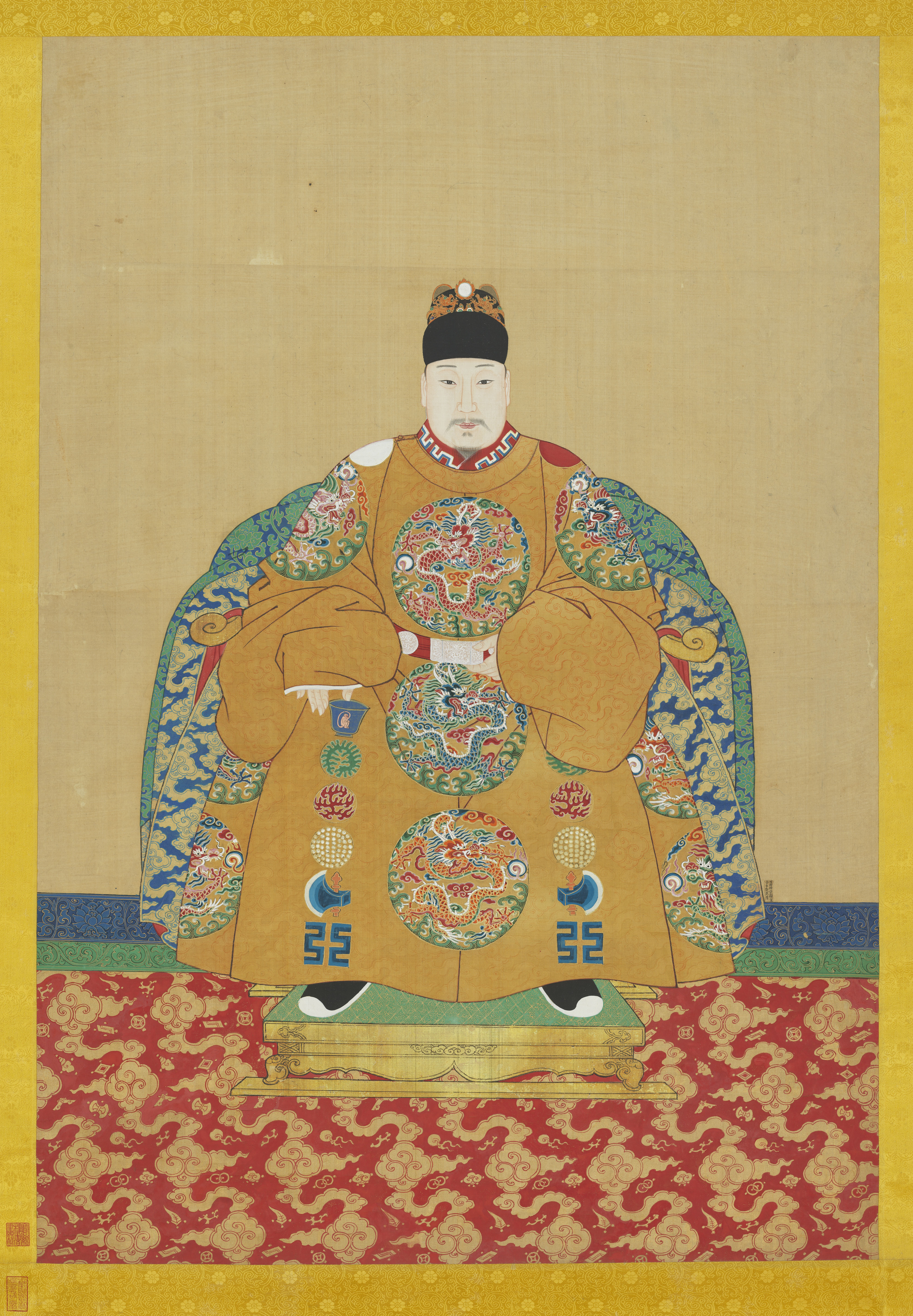
- The Hongwu Emperor (top left), who proclaimed the Ming dynasty on 23 January 1368, and his son, the Yongle Emperor (top right), whose reign is often seen as the "second founding" of the Ming dynasty since he reversed many of his father's policies.
- The Wanli Emperor (bottom left), the longest-reigning Ming emperor, and his son, the Taichang Emperor (bottom right), whose reign in contrast was the shortest in the history of the Ming dynasty.

The Ming dynasty was founded by Zhu Yuanzhang (the Hongwu Emperor), who was one of the leaders of the Red Turban peasant rebellion. Despite humble beginnings, he successfully built his own state, defeated other rebel leaders, and forced the last Yuan emperor to flee China proper. On Chinese New Year in 1368, Zhu Yuanzhang declared the establishment of a new imperial dynasty titled Great Ming (大明; Dà Míng) and declared himself its first emperor.

The emperors of the Ming dynasty inherited the throne according to the principle of primogeniture. According to the Hongwu Emperor's Ancestral Instructions, the heir to the throne was always the eldest son of the emperor and empress, or his heir, followed by younger sons of the empress. Sons of concubines were excluded from the line of succession. Conservative officials strongly insisted on following this strict rule throughout the Ming era. Even the Wanli Emperor, who for two decades tried to appoint his third son, Zhu Changxun, as his heir, was eventually forced to give in and appoint his eldest son, the future Taichang Emperor. The only successful violator of the succession rules was the Yongle Emperor, the third emperor of the dynasty. He gained power in a three-year civil war against his nephew, the Jianwen Emperor.

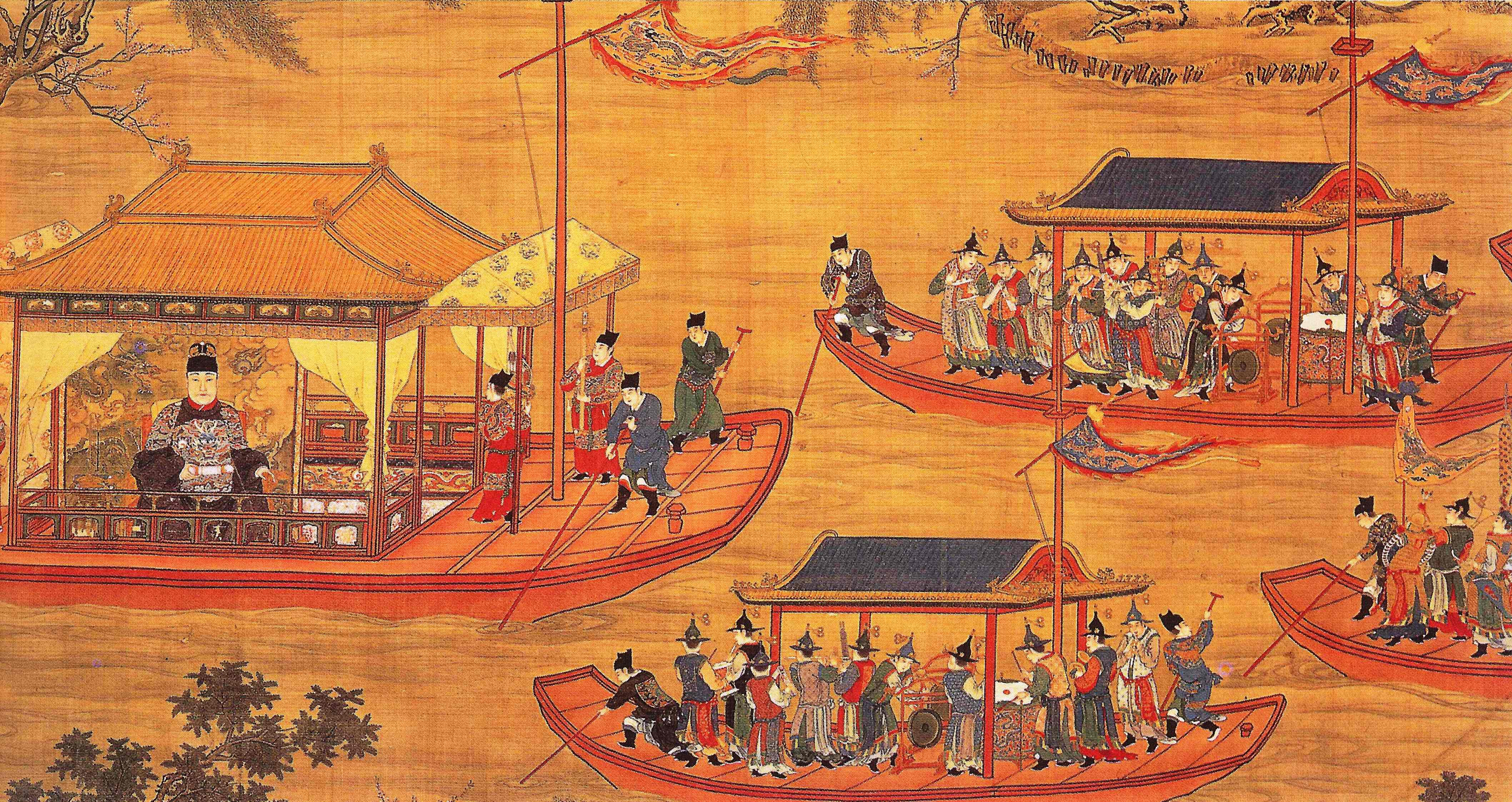
The Wanli Emperor on his state barge as depicted in the Return Clearing (National Palace Museum, Taiwan). Imperial journeys were used to impress the population with the emperor's power and wealth, and he travelled in luxury with a vast entourage. Journeys by water provided a useful opportunity for inspecting the upkeep of the all-important water-transport system and the maintenance of irrigation works and dykes.

The emperor, or huangdi, was the supreme head of state, a tradition that dated back to the Qin dynasty (221–206 BC) and was continued by the Ming dynasty. In theory, he held ultimate authority over all officials and generals, and the entire country was expected to obey his decrees. However, this power came at a cost, as the Hongwu Emperor tightly controlled his power through numerous purges. As the dynasty progressed, the successors of the Hongwu Emperor lacked his decisiveness and were constrained by traditional limitations. The emperor was not expected to make independent decisions regarding the direction of the country. Instead, memoranda and demands were presented to them with proposed solutions. The emperor's role was to either confirm the submitted proposals or negotiate an alternative solution with the submitters. Similarly, the emperors appointed officials and generals based on recommendations from the Ministry of Personnel or the Ministry of War. In the case of high dignitaries, the ruler was given a choice between two to three candidates. Major issues were typically discussed at official audiences or informal meetings, and it was necessary to reach a broad consensus among court dignitaries before making any significant decisions.

During the reigns of the Hongwu Emperor and his successors, China generally experienced a period of economic growth and political stability. In the 17th century, a combination of climate changes and poor economic policies led to widespread famines and epidemics. The government's authority weakened, and numerous uprisings erupted. In 1644, the rebel army successfully captured Beijing, leading to the suicide of the last Ming emperor, the Chongzhen Emperor (r. 1627–1644). The leader of the uprising, Li Zicheng, declared himself the emperor of the new Shun dynasty. To defeat the rebels, Wu Sangui, the last Ming general in the northeast, invited the Manchu-led Eight Banners of the Qing dynasty to enter the Central Plains. The Manchus then occupied northern China that same year.

Despite losing control of the north, members of the Ming imperial family continued to rule over southern China. However, they were gradually pushed out by the Manchus until the last emperor, the Yongli Emperor, was executed in 1662 in Burma. Later historians referred to the emperors of the Ming regimes in southern China as the rulers of the Southern Ming dynasty.

== List of emperors ==
The emperor's personal name (名字; Míngzi) was tabooed after his ascension to the throne. He was referred to and addressed with titles of varying degrees of formality—Your Majesty (陛下; Bìxià), His Majesty the Emperor (皇上; Huángshang, or simply 上; Shang). After death, the emperor received an honorary posthumous name (謚號; Shìhào), usually consisting of nineteen written characters for emperors of the Ming dynasty; however, the founder of the dynasty, the Hongwu Emperor, was honored with a name of twenty-three written characters. Another name given posthumously was the temple name (廟號; Miàohào) which, along with the posthumous name, was used for worship in the Imperial Ancestral Temple. Due to the repetition of the same temple and posthumous names for emperors of different dynasties, the dynastic name is used as a differentiator when necessary. For example, the Hongwu Emperor is frequently referred to as "Ming Taizu".

Era name (年號; Niánhào), or "reign title", was chosen at the beginning of the emperor's reign to reflect the political, economic, and/or social landscapes at the time. During the Ming dynasty, except for Emperor Yingzong, the emperors only declared one era name during their reign, whereas emperors of previous dynasties usually had multiple era names. The emperors of the Ming dynasty were therefore commonly referred to by their single era names.

shading, with (regency) in the "Reign" column, denotes regents between crowned rulers.

Ming dynasty (1368–1644)
Sovereign	Portrait	Personal name	Reign (Note: In the Ming dynasty, a few days usually separate each emperor's reign. When a Ming emperor died there was a period of mourning, after which their successor was crowned as soon a "propitious" day was chosen. Emperors reigned in their predecessor's era name until a new era name was declared at the beginning of the next year. Thus, the Hongwu (洪武) era did not technically end with the Hongwu Emperor's death on 24 June 1398, but ended on 5 February 1399 when the subsequent Jianwen Emperor began a new era on 6 February 1399.)	Succession	Life details
Hongwu Emperor 洪武帝	Hongwu Emperor	Zhu Yuanzhang 朱元璋 Other names: Temple name: Taizu (太祖) Posthumous name: Emperor Kaitian Xingdao Zhaoji Liji Dasheng Zhishen Renwen Yiwu Junde Chenggong Gao (開天行道肇紀立極大聖至神仁文義武俊德成功高皇帝)	23 January 1368 – 24 June 1398 (30 years, 5 months and 1 day) Era(s): Hongwu (洪武) 23 January 1368 – 24 June 1398	Born into poverty, he led the Red Turban Rebellions to establish the Ming dynasty	21 October 1328 – 24 June 1398 (aged 69) Initiated cultural reconstruction and political reform, also noted for his extreme and violent methods of enforcement. Died of natural causes.
Jianwen Emperor 建文帝	—N/a	Zhu Yunwen 朱允炆 Other names: Temple name: Huizong (惠宗) (Note: After the Jianwen Emperor died in a palace fire, the Yongle Emperor ascended to the throne. In an attempt to diminish the legacy of his predecessor, he chose not to give him a temple or posthumous name. Additionally, he retroactively abolished the Jianwen era and extended the Hongwu era in its place. However, the temple name Huizong was given to the Jianwen Emperor long after his reign by the Hongguang Emperor in 1644; the posthumous name Emperor Gongmin Hui was given to him by the Qing Qianlong Emperor in 1736.) Posthumous name: Emperor Gongmin Hui (恭閔惠皇帝)	30 June 1398 – 13 July 1402 (4 years and 13 days) Era(s): Hongwu (洪武) 30 June 1398 – 5 February 1399; Jianwen (建文) 6 February 1399 – 13 July 1402	Grandson of the Hongwu Emperor	5 December 1377 – 13 July 1402 (aged 24) Overthrown by the future Yongle Emperor, his uncle. Either died in or disappeared after fires in the Ming Palace.
Yongle Emperor 永樂帝	Yongle Emperor	Zhu Di 朱棣 Other names: Temple name: Chengzu (成祖) (Note: Following his death, the Yongle Emperor was given the temple name Taizong (太宗) by his successor the Hongxi Emperor, but this was changed on 3 October 1538 to Chengzu (成祖) by the Jiajing Emperor. The latter has been used since its bestowment) Posthumous name: Emperor Qitian Hongdao Gaoming Zhaoyun Shengwu Shengong Chunren Zhixiao Wen (啓天弘道高明肇運聖武神功純仁至孝文皇帝)	17 July 1402 – 12 August 1424 (22 years and 26 days) Era(s): Hongwu (洪武) 30 July 1402 – 22 January 1403; Yongle (永樂) 23 January 1403 – 19 January 1425	Son of the Hongwu Emperor	2 May 1360 – 12 August 1424 (aged 64) Raised the Ming to its highest power. Launched five military campaigns against the Mongols, reestablished Chinese rule in Vietnam, and moved the capital to Beijing. Patron of many projects, including the Porcelain Tower of Nanjing, Yongle Encyclopedia and Ming treasure voyages. Died of natural causes.
Hongxi Emperor 洪熙帝	Hongxi Emperor	Zhu Gaochi 朱高熾 Other names: Temple name: Renzong (仁宗) Posthumous name: Emperor Jingtian Tidao Chuncheng Zhide Hongwen Qinwu Zhangsheng Daxiao Zhao (敬天體道純誠至德弘文欽武章聖達孝昭皇帝)	12 August 1424 – 29 May 1425 (9 months and 17 days) Era(s): Yongle (永樂) 12 August 1424 – 19 January 1425; Hongxi (洪熙) 20 January 1425 – 7 February 1426	Son of the Yongle Emperor	16 August 1378 – 29 May 1425 (aged 46) Focused primarily on domestic affairs. Died of natural causes.
Xuande Emperor 宣德帝	Xuande Emperor	Zhu Zhanji 朱瞻基 Other names: Temple name: Xuanzong (宣宗) Posthumous name: Emperor Xiantian Chongdao Yingming Shensheng Qinwen Zhaowu Kuanren Chunxiao Zhang (憲天崇道英明神聖欽文昭武寬仁純孝章皇帝)	29 May 1425 – 31 January 1435 (9 years, 8 months and 2 days) Era(s): Hongxi (洪熙) 28 June 1425 – 7 February 1426; Xuande (宣德) 8 February 1426 – 17 January 1436	Son of the Hongxi Emperor	16 March 1399 – 31 January 1435 (aged 35) Stabilized the socio-economics and politics, commissioned the seventh and last Ming treasure voyage, but failed to resolve problems within the military and allowed the influence of court eunuchs to grow. Also a noted painter. Died of natural causes.
Emperor Yingzong 英宗	Emperor Yingzong of Ming	Zhu Qizhen 朱祁镇 Other names: Temple name: Yingzong (英宗) Posthumous name: Emperor Fatian Lidao Renming Chengjing Zhaowen Xianwu Zhide Guangxiao Rui (法天立道仁明誠敬昭文憲武至德廣孝睿皇帝)	31 January 1435 – 22 September 1449 (14 years, 7 months and 22 days) (Note: Emperor Yingzong was captured by the Oirat Mongols in 1449, and his brother, the Jingtai Emperor, ascended to the throne. After the Jingtai Emperor was deposed in a palace coup in 1457, Emperor Yingzong returned to the throne and declared a new era, Tianshun.) Era(s): Xuande (宣德) 31 January 1435 – 17 January 1436; Zhengtong (正統) 18 January 1436 – 13 January 1450	Son of the Xuande Emperor	29 November 1427 – 23 February 1464 (aged 36) First child emperor. His reign was dominated by eunuchs, particularly Wang Zhen, which led to growing instability. Captured by the Oirat Mongols during the Tumu Crisis.
Jingtai Emperor 景泰帝	—N/a	Zhu Qiyu 朱祁鈺 Other names: Temple name: Daizong (代宗) Posthumous name: Emperor Gongren Kangding Jing (恭仁康定景皇帝)	22 September 1449 – 11 February 1457 (7 years, 4 months and 20 days) Era(s): Zhengtong (正統) 22 September 1449 – 13 January 1450; Jingtai (景泰) 14 January 1450 – 11 February 1457	Son of the Xuande Emperor	11 September 1428 – 14 March 1457 (aged 28) Assumed power while his brother was held captive, successfully defended Beijing, and restored the empire's strength, but was later deposed in a palace coup. Died a month later, possibly from murder.
Emperor Yingzong (second reign)	Emperor Yingzong of Ming	Zhu Qizhen 朱祁镇	11 February 1457 – 23 February 1464 (7 years and 12 days) Era(s): Tianshun (天順) 11 February 1457 – 26 January 1465	Son of the Xuande Emperor	29 November 1427 – 23 February 1464 (aged 36) Restored to power after his release. Suppressed the Rebellion of Cao Qin and abolished the practice of concubine sacrifice. Died of natural causes.
Chenghua Emperor 成化帝	Chenghua Emperor	Zhu Jianshen 朱見濡 Other names: Temple name: Xianzong (憲宗) Posthumous name: Emperor Jitian Ningdao Chengming Renjing Chongwen Suwu Hongde Shengxiao Chun (繼天凝道誠明仁敬崇文肅武宏德聖孝純皇帝)	23 February 1464 – 9 September 1487 (23 years, 6 months and 17 days) Era(s): Tianshun (天順) 23 February 1464 – 26 January 1465; Chenghua (成化) 27 January 1465 – 9 September 1487	Son of Emperor Yingzong	9 December 1447 – 9 September 1487 (aged 39) His reign was marked by military victories and liberal political policies but was spent mostly under the power of eunuchs and his favorite concubine, Lady Wan. Died of natural causes.
Hongzhi Emperor 弘治帝	Hongzhi Emperor	Zhu Youcheng 朱祐樘 Other names: Temple name: Xiaozong (孝宗) Posthumous name: Emperor Jiantian Mingdao Chuncheng Zhongzheng Shengwen Shenwu Zhiren Dade Jing (建天明道誠純中正聖文神武至仁大德敬皇帝)	9 September 1487 – 8 June 1505 (17 years, 8 months and 30 days) Era(s): Chenghua (成化) 9 September 1487 – 13 January 1488; Hongzhi (弘治) 14 January 1488 – 23 January 1506	Son of the Chenghua Emperor	30 July 1470 – 9 June 1505 (aged 34) Initiated the Hongzhi Restoration. Died of natural causes.
Zhengde Emperor 正德帝	Zhengde Emperor	Zhu Houzhao 朱厚㷖 Other names: Temple name: Wuzong (武宗) Posthumous name: Emperor Chengtian Dadao Yingsu Ruizhe Zhaode Xiangong Hongwen Sixiao Yi (承天達道英肅睿哲昭德顯功弘文思孝毅皇帝)	9 June 1505 – 20 April 1521 (15 years, 10 months and 11 days) Era(s): Hongzhi (弘治) 9 June 1505 – 23 January 1506; Zhengde (正德) 24 January 1506 – 20 April 1521	Son of the Hongzhi Emperor	14 November 1491 – 20 April 1521 (aged 29) His reign saw the rise of influence from eunuchs, particularly Liu Jin. Died of an illness a few months after his boat capsized.
Jiajing Emperor 嘉靖帝	Jiajing Emperor	Zhu Houcong 朱厚熜 Other names: Temple name: Shizong (世宗) Posthumous name: Emperor Qintian Lüdao Yingyi Shengshen Xuanwen Guangwu Hongren Daxiao Su (欽天履道英毅聖神宣文廣武洪仁大孝肅皇帝)	27 May 1521 – 23 January 1567 (45 years, 7 months and 26 days) Era(s): Zhengde (正德) 27 May 1521 – 26 January 1522; Jiajing (嘉靖) 28 January 1522 – 23 January 1567	Grandson of the Chenghua Emperor, cousin of the Zhengde Emperor	16 September 1507 – 23 January 1567 (aged 59) The only Ming emperor to follow Taoism. Died after a period of prolonged illness, possibly due to alchemical elixir poisoning.
Longqing Emperor 隆慶帝	Longqing Emperor	Zhu Zaiji 朱載坖 Other names: Temple name: Muzong (穆宗) Posthumous name: Emperor Qitian Longdao Yuanyi Kuanren Xianwen Guangwu Chunde Hongxiao Zhuang (契天隆道淵懿寬仁顯文光武純德弘孝莊皇帝)	23 January 1567 – 5 July 1572 (5 years, 5 months and 12 days) Era(s): Jiajing (嘉靖) 23 January 1567 – 8 February 1567; Longqing (隆慶) 9 February 1567 – 5 July 1572	Son of the Jiajing Emperor	4 March 1537 – 5 July 1572 (aged 35) Peace with the Mongols, opening the borders, stabilized the socio-economic situation but indulged in lust and a lavish lifestyle. Died of natural causes.
Wanli Emperor 萬曆帝	Wanli Emperor	Zhu Yijun 朱翊鈞 Other names: Temple name: Shenzong (神宗) Posthumous name: Emperor Fantian Hedao Zhesu Dunjian Guangwen Zhangwu Anren Zhixiao Xian (範天合道哲肅敦簡光文章武安仁止孝顯皇帝)	5 July 1572 – 18 August 1620 (48 years, 1 month and 13 days) Era(s): Longqing (隆慶) 5 July 1572 – 1 February 1573; Wanli (萬曆) 2 February 1573 – 18 August 1620	Son of the Longqing Emperor	4 September 1563 – 18 August 1620 (aged 56) Longest reigning Ming emperor. Despite early successes, the gradual decline of Ming began towards the end of his reign. Died of natural causes.
Taichang Emperor 泰昌帝	Taichang Emperor	Zhu Changluo 朱常洛 Other names: Temple name: Guangzong (光宗) Posthumous name: Emperor Chongtian Qidao Yingrui Gongchun Xianwen Jingwu Yuanren Yixiao Zhen (崇天契道英睿恭純憲文景武淵仁懿孝貞皇帝)	28 August – 26 September 1620 (29 days) Era(s): Taichang (泰昌) 28 August 1620 – 26 September 1620	Son of the Wanli Emperor	28 August 1582 – 26 September 1620 (aged 38) Died suddenly after a reign of around a month, possibly poisoned.
Tianqi Emperor 天啓帝	Tianqi Emperor	Zhu Youjiao 朱由校 Other names: Temple name: Xizong (熹宗) Posthumous name: Emperor Datian Chandao Dunxiao Duyou Zhangwen Xiangwu Jingmu Zhuangqin Zhe (達天闡道敦孝篤友章文襄武靖穆莊勤悊皇帝)	26 September 1620 – 30 September 1627 (7 years and 4 days) Era(s): Taichang (泰昌) 26 September 1620 – 21 January 1621; Tianqi (天啓) 22 January 1621 – 30 September 1627	Son of the Taichang Emperor	23 December 1605 – 30 September 1627 (aged 21) His reign was dominated by the eunuch Wei Zhongxian. Died from an unknown illness.
Chongzhen Emperor 崇禎帝	—N/a	Zhu Youjian 朱由檢 Other names: Temple name: Sizong (思宗) Posthumous name: Emperor Zhuanglie Min (莊烈愍皇帝)	2 October 1627 – 25 April 1644 (16 years, 6 months and 23 days) Era(s): Tianqi (天啓) 2 October 1627 – 4 February 1628; Chongzhen (崇禎) 5 February 1628 – 25 April 1644	Son of the Taichang Emperor, brother of the Tianqi Emperor	6 February 1611 – 25 April 1644 (aged 33) Attempted to revive the dynasty but failed to resolve problems in the Ming administration, unable to suppress peasant rebellions and defend against the Manchu invasions. Committed suicide, possibly by hanging himself on a tree, during the fall of Beijing to rebel forces of Li Zicheng.

Southern Ming (1644–1662)
Sovereign	Personal name	Reign	Succession	Life details
Hongguang Emperor 弘光帝	Zhu Yousong 朱由崧 Other names: Temple name: Anzong (安宗) Posthumous name: Emperor Fengtian Zundao Kuanhe Jingmu Xiuwen Buwu Wengong Renxiao Jian (奉天遵道寬和靜穆修文布武溫恭仁孝簡皇帝)	19 June 1644 – 15 June 1645 (11 months and 27 days) Era(s): Chongzhen (崇禎) 19 June 1644 – 27 January 1645; Hongguang (弘光) 28 January 1645 – 17 August 1645	Grandson of the Wanli Emperor	5 September 1607 – 23 May 1646 (aged 38) His reign was plagued by political struggles. Executed by the Qing dynasty.
Known by his personal name	Zhu Changfang 朱常淓	1 July – 6 July 1645 (5 days) (regency) Era(s): regent Lu (Luh) (潞王監國) (Note: The two characters are both pronounced Lu but with different tones; to distinguish them in Roman script, one is usually kept as Lu and the other spelled differently. Luh is from Cambridge History of China; Lou is from A.C. Moule's Rulers of China (1957). When one irregular spelling is used, the other is kept as regular (Lu). The two systems are distinct and not used simultaneously.) (Note: Not an actual era name, but used in place of an era name and served a similar function.) 1 July – 6 July 1645	Grandson of the Longqing Emperor	1608 – 23 May 1646 (aged 38) Surrendered to the Qing dynasty, later executed.
Longwu Emperor 隆武帝	Zhu Yujian 朱聿鍵 Other names: Temple name: Shaozong (紹宗) Posthumous name: Emperor Peitian Zhidao Hongyi Sumu Siwen Liewu Minren Guangxiao Xiang (配天至道弘毅肅穆思文烈武敏仁廣孝襄皇帝)	18 August 1645 – 6 October 1646 (1 year, 1 month and 18 days) Era(s): Hongguang (弘光) 18 August – 28 August 1645; Longwu (隆武) 28 August 1645 – 4 February 1647	Son of Zhu Qisheng, a descendant of the first Ming emperor	25 May 1602 – 6 October 1646 (aged 44) Made utmost efforts to restore the Ming regime but was betrayed by his strongest supporter, Zheng Zhilong. Captured and killed by Qing forces.
Shaowu Emperor 紹武帝	Zhu Yuyue 朱聿鐭	11 December 1646 – 20 January 1647 (1 month and 9 days) Era(s): Longwu (隆武) 11 December 1646 – 20 January 1647; Shaowu (紹武) (Note: The era name Shaowu was originally planned to supersede Longwu in 1647, but the Shaowu Emperor's reign ended before the era name was put into effective use.)	Son of Zhu Qisheng, a descendant of the first Ming emperor, and younger brother of the Longwu Emperor	1605 – 20 January 1647 (aged 42) Committed suicide after being captured by Qing forces.
Known by his personal name	Zhu Yihai 朱以海	7 September 1645 – 1653 (7 years) (regency) Era(s): Hongguang (弘光) 7 September 1645 – 15 February 1646 (Note: On 7 September 1645, Zhu Yihai declared himself regent in Shaoxing and refused to acknowledge the legitimacy of the Longwu Emperor in Fuzhou. Thus, he continued using the era name Hongguang before changing the era to regent Lu (Lou) the following year.); regent Lu (Lou) (魯監國) 16 February 1646 – 1653	Son of Zhu Shouyong, a descendant of the first Ming emperor	6 July 1618 – 23 December 1662 (aged 44) Died of natural causes.
Yongli Emperor 永曆帝	Zhu Youlang 朱由榔 Other names: Temple name: Zhaozong (昭宗) (Note: The Yongli Emperor's temple and posthumous names were conferred by Zheng Jing, the ruler of the Ming loyalist Kingdom of Tungning.) Posthumous name: Emperor Yingtian Tuidao Minyi Gongjian Jingwen Weiwu Liren Kexiao Kuang (應天推道敏毅恭檢經文緯武禮仁克孝匡皇帝)	24 December 1646 – 1 June 1662 (15 years, 5 months and 8 days) Era(s): Longwu (隆武) 24 December 1646 – 4 February 1647; Yongli (永曆) 5 February 1647 – 1 June 1662	Son of Zhu Changying and grandson of the Wanli Emperor	1 November 1623 – 1 June 1662 (aged 38) Captured and killed by Qing forces.

== See also ==
- Ming emperors family tree
- List of vassal prince peerages of the Ming dynasty
- Dynasties of China
- List of Chinese monarchs
- Southern Ming topics
