= Li Dingguo =

Chinese military general

- 李定國
- Born: 29 July 1621; Yan'an Prefecture, Shaanxi, Ming dynasty (now Yulin, Shaanxi, China)
- Died: 10 August 1662 (aged 41); Mengla, Yunnan, Qing dynasty
- Title: Prince of Anxi (安西王, 1647–1649); Marquis of Kang (康侯, 1649); Duke of Kang (康國公, 1649–1652); Prince of Xining (西寧王, 1652–1656); Prince of Jin (晉王, 1656–1662)

Li Dingguo (simplified Chinese: 李定国; traditional Chinese: 李定國; pinyin: Lǐ Dìngguó; Wade–Giles: Li Ting-kuo; 29 July 1621–10 August 1662), formally Prince of Jin, was a Chinese military general of the Southern Ming dynasty who fought against the Qing dynasty.

== As Zhang Xianzhong's general ==
Li was an adopted son of the rebel leader Zhang Xianzhong, and appointed a general in Zhang's army with the title General Pacifier of the West (安西將軍). After Zhang's death in 1647, he and other generals of Zhang's, including Sun Kewang (孫可望), held out in Guizhou, then took over Chongqing in Sichuan, then south through Zunyi to take Guiyang in Guizhou in 1647.

== Resistance to Qing ==
Li had tried to form a united front by combining Southern Ming forces with the rebels against the Qing dynasty, and became the most important military commander of the Yongli Emperor of the Southern Ming dynasty. He and Sun Kewang first aided Ming loyalists by suppressing a rebellion in Yunnan in 1648, they then made strikes to stop the advance of the Qing army in Sichuan and Huguang.

In 1652 he led a list of successful campaigns in southern Huguang and eastern Guangxi. His troops took the city of Guilin, and the Qing general Kong Youde committed suicide after his defeat. Li also occupied Hengzhou while his forces ambushed and killed the Manchu prince Nikan. By 1653, he was forced to withdraw to northern Guangdong. In 1654 he attempted to take Xinhui, but was defeated and retreated to Nanning in 1655.

In 1656 he escorted the Yongli Emperor from Anlong to Yunnan-fu where the emperor set up an administration. Li was awarded with the title "Prince of Jin" (晉王, Jin Wang).

Li and Sun Kewang became embroiled in a power struggle. In 1657, Sun attacked Li in eastern Yunnan, but his generals turned against him, and Sun was forced to retreat back to Guizhou. Sun then surrendered to the Qing authorities in December 1657, and urged the Qing to allow him to lead an attack on the Ming rebel forces. The Qing however chose to order Wu Sangui to push into Sichuan, and captured Chongqing and then Zunyi in Guizhou in 1658.

In March 1659, Li Dingguo's army was defeated by Wu Sangui and Jobtei near Yunnan-fu, and had to retreat to northern Burma, while the Yongli Emperor sought refuge with the Burmese king Pindale Min and reached Ava in June 1659.

== Death ==
In December 1661 and the following January, Wu Sangui and the Manchu duke Aisingga entered Burma and defeated Li, who withdrew eastwards. Wu then demanded that the Burmese king hand over Yongli. The previous Burmese king Pindale who gave shelter to Yongli had by then been deposed by Pye Min, and the new king of Burma complied with Wu's demand. Yongli and his sons were handed over, and they were executed in Yunnanfu in May 1662. Li despaired upon hearing the news, and soon died (probably in August 1662) near the border between Yunnan and Laos. His last words, said to his son Li Sixing (李嗣興) and his generals Jin Tongwu (靳統武) and Ma Siliang (馬思良), were: "Rather die in wilderness than surrender!" However, his son would later surrender to the Qing.

== See also ==
- Ming dynasty
- Southern Ming
- Zhang Xianzhong
- Anti-Qing sentiment
