= Prince of Gui (Ming dynasty) =

Prince of Gui 桂王
- Creation date: 1601
- Created by: Wanli Emperor
- Peerage: 1st-rank princely peerage for imperial son of Ming Dynasty
- First holder: Zhu Changying, Prince Duan
- Last holder: Name unknown (the 4th prince)
- Status: Extinct
- Extinction date: 1662
- Seat: Hengzhou (nowadays Hengyang)

Prince of Gui (Chinese: 桂王), was a first-rank princely peerage used during the Ming dynasty, this peerage title was created by the Wanli Emperor. The first Prince of Gui was Zhu Changying, 7th son of the Wanli Emperor. This peerage had 6 cadet commandery princely peerages; none of these second-rank peerages were inherited. The last Southern Ming emperor, Zhu Youlang (Yongli Emperor), was a member of this peerage.

== Generation name / poem ==
As members of this peerage were descendants of the Yongle Emperor, their generation poem was:-

"Gao Zhan Qi Jian You, Hou Zai Yi Chang You. Ci He Yi Bo Zhong, Jian Jing Di Xian You"
高瞻祁見祐，厚載翊常由。慈和怡伯仲，簡靖迪先猷

This peerage used the poem until the Ci (慈) generation.

== Members ==
- Zhu Changying (朱常瀛; 1597 -21 Dec 1645)(1st), Wanli Emperor's 7th son. He was granted the title in 1601 from his father and took his fief in 1627. After Zhang Xianzhong attacked his princedom, he and his surviving family escaped to Guangxi. He later died and was buried at Wuzhou. After his fourth son, Zhu Youlang, acceded as Southern Ming's emperor, he was posthumously honored as an emperor by his son under the temple name "Lizong" (禮宗) and posthumous name "Emperor Titian Changdao Zhuangyi Wenghong Xingwen Xuanwu Renzhi Chengxiao Duan" (體天昌道莊毅溫弘興文宣武仁智誠孝端皇帝). His original posthumous name was Prince Duan of Gui (桂端王)
  - Name unknown, Hereditary Prince, Zhu Changying's eldest son who died prematurely.
  - Name unknown, Zhu Changying's second son. He was designated as his father's heir after the death of his eldest brother. Zhu Youlang posthumously honoured him the posthumous title "Prince Wen of Gui" (桂閔王)
  - Zhu You'ai (朱由𣜬; d.1646) (2nd), Zhu Changying's third son. He initially held the title Prince of Anren Comm. (安仁郡王). He inherited the princedom from 1645 to 1646. He died in Guangxi. His full posthumous name is Prince Gong of Gui (桂恭王)
    - Name unknown (d.1662) (4th), he succeeded the princedom after Zhu Youlang's enthronement.
  - Zhu Youlang (3rd), Zhu Changying's fourth son. he initially held the title Prince of Yongming Comm. (永明郡王). He succeeded the princedom in 1646. After his enthronement, the princedom was inherited by Zhu You'ai's son.
  - Zhu Youzhan (朱由榐), Zhu Changying's fifth son. He held the title Prince of Yongxing Comm. (永兴郡王). He died in chaos.
  - Name unknown, Zhu Changying's sixth son, died in chaos. He was posthumously bestowed the title "Prince of Xintian Comm." (新田郡王) during Longwu Emperor's reign.
  - Name unknown, Zhu Changying's seventh son, died in chaos. He was posthumously bestowed the title "Prince of Jianghua Comm." (江华郡王) during Longwu Emperor's reign.
  - Name unknown, Zhu Changying's eighth son, died prematurely. He was posthumously bestowed the title "Prince of Jiashan Comm." (嘉善郡王) during Longwu Emperor's reign.
