= Aisingga =

Chinese military leader

Aisingga (Manchu: ᠠᡳᠰᡳᠩᡤᠠ, romanized: aisingga; Chinese: 愛星阿; pinyin: Àixīng'ā, d. 1664) was a Qing dynasty general who was a grandson of Prince Yangguri (揚古利) and the head of the Šumuru tribe. He served under Nurhaci and Hong Taiji. In 1660, he was appointed "General Who Pacifies the West" (定西將軍) to command the Qing forces in Yunnan fighting the Ming loyalists. In 1661, Aixinga advanced into Burma with Wu Sangui and captured the Southern Ming pretender Zhu Youlang. He was canonised as Jìngkāng (敬康).
