= Longwu Emperor =

Emperor of Southern Ming from 1645 to 1646

Longwu Emperor 隆武帝
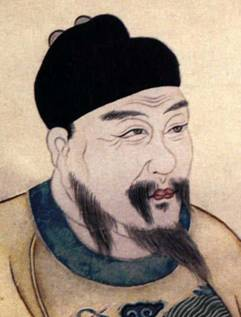
- Qing Dynasty portrait of the Longwu Emperor

Emperor of the Southern Ming dynasty
- Reign: 18 August 1645 – 6 October 1646
- Predecessor: Hongguang Emperor
- Successor: Shaowu Emperor

Prince of Tang
- First tenure: 18 July 1632 – 17 December 1632
- Predecessor: Zhu Shuohuang, Prince Duan
- Successor: Zhu Yuse, Prince Min
- Second tenure: 31 July 1645 – 18 August 1645
- Predecessor: Zhu Yuse, Prince Min
- Successor: Zhu Yuyue

Prince of Nanyang
- Tenure: 1644 – 31 July 1645
- Born: 25 May 1602
- Died: 6 October 1646 (aged 44)
- Burial: Luohanling (羅漢嶺), Tingzhou
- Spouse: Empress Xiaoyixiang
- Issue: Zhu Linyuan, Crown Prince Zhuangjing
Names
- Zhu Yujian (Note: simplified Chinese: 朱聿键; traditional Chinese: 朱聿鍵; pinyin: Zhū Yùjiàn)
Era dates
- Longwu: (Note: Chinese: 隆武; pinyin: Lóngwǔ) 18 August 1645 – 4 February 1647
Regnal name
- Emperor Siwen (Note: Chinese: 思文皇帝 (conferred by the Yongli Emperor))
Posthumous name
- Emperor Peitian Zhidao Hongyi Sumu Siwen Liewu Minren Guangxiao Xiang (Note: simplified Chinese: 配天至道弘毅肃穆思文烈武敏仁广孝襄皇帝; traditional Chinese: 配天至道弘毅肅穆思文烈武敏仁廣孝襄皇帝 (conferred by the Yongli Emperor))
Temple name
- Shaozong (Note: simplified Chinese: 绍宗; traditional Chinese: 紹宗; pinyin: Shàozōng (conferred by the Yongli Emperor))
- House: Zhu
- Dynasty: Southern Ming
- Father: Zhu Qisheng
- Mother: Lady Mao

Chinese name
- Chinese: 隆武帝
Transcriptions
Standard Mandarin
- Hanyu Pinyin: Lóngwǔ Dì

Zhu Yujian (1602 – 6 October 1646), nickname Changshou, (Note: simplified Chinese: 长寿; traditional Chinese: 長壽; pinyin: Chángshòu) originally the Prince of Tang, later reigned as the Longwu Emperor of the Southern Ming dynasty from 18 August 1645, when he was enthroned in Fuzhou, to 6 October 1646, when he was captured and executed by a contingent of the Qing army. He was an eighth generation descendant of Zhu Jing, Prince Ding of Tang, who was the 23rd son of Ming founder Zhu Yuanzhang (Hongwu Emperor).

== Early life ==
Before ascending to the throne, he followed his father as the Prince of Tang, their fief being situated in Nanyang prefecture, in Henan province. In 1636, he was stripped of his title by the Chongzhen Emperor and put under house arrest in Fengyang. His former title was transferred to his younger brother Zhu Yumo (朱聿鏌). In 1641, Zhu Yumo committed suicide when Li Zicheng invaded Nanyang. After the death of the Chongzhen Emperor 1644, his successor on the Ming throne, the Hongguang Emperor, released the Prince of Tang from his arrest.

== Reign ==
When Qing forces captured Nanjing in June 1645, he fled to Hangzhou. However, when Hangzhou fell to the Qing on 6 July 1645, the Prince of Tang managed to escape by land to the southeastern province of Fujian.

In August of the same year, at the behest of several high officials, he ascended to the Ming throne in Fuzhou, taking the reign title "Longwu" (隆武; pinyin: Lóngwǔ). His era name means "plentiful and martial". After a promising start, Fujian's geographical position on the margin of the empire, cut off from the heartland by several mountain ranges, as well as his lack of effective troops and the failure on part of the officialdom to find a united stance doomed the Longwu government. When Qing forces invaded Fujian in the late summer of 1646, Zheng Zhilong, the emperor's strongest ally, surrendered while his son Zheng Chenggong (the famous Koxinga) retreated to the sea.

The Prince of Tang was left with a dwindling court. On 6 October 1646, he was captured and immediately executed.

== Personality ==
Against the Ming policy of keeping imperial princes out of politics, the Prince of Tang early on showed interest in the government of the empire and strove for a larger role of the princes in it. His initiatives had brought him under house arrest during the reign of the Chongzhen Emperor, but his knowledge of history and of Ming institutions, paired with a diligent personality, made him take his imperial role seriously.

Zhu Yujian is said to have had a very close relationship with his wife, who had shared his hardship when he was incarcerated. Contrary to Chinese custom, he steadfastly declined to take any concubines.

== Consorts and issue ==
- Empress Xiaoyixiang, of the Zeng clan (孝毅襄皇后 曾氏; d. 1646)
  - Zhu Linyuan, Crown Prince Zhuangjing (莊敬太子 朱琳源; 1646－1646), first son
- Concubine, of the Shen clan (沈嫔)
- Concubine, of the Chen clan (陳嬪)

== Ancestry ==
Patrilineal descent

Zhu Yujian was the senior-most male-line descendants of Zhu Jing, Prince Ding of Tang, the 23rd son of Zhu Yuanzhang, after his father's death. Therefore, he was an eighth cousin of the Wanli Emperor. This chart only showed the latest actual title of the person(s).

1. Zhu Yuanzhang, the Hongwu Emperor, 1328–1398
2. Zhu Jing, Prince Ding of Tang, 1386–1415 (23rd son)
3. Zhu Qiongda, Prince Xian of Tang, 1412–1475 (4th son & 2nd son as son by primary consort)
4. Zhu Zhizhi, Prince Zhuang of Tang, 1432–1485 (2nd son)
5. Zhu Miqian, Comm. Prince Gongjing of Wencheng, d.1516 (3rd son)
6. Zhu Yuwen, Prince Jing of Tang, 1490–1560
7. Zhu Zhouyong, Prince Shun of Tang, 1538–1564
8. Zhu Shuohuang, Prince Duan of Tang, d.1630
9. Zhu Qisheng, the Hereditary Prince of Tang, d.1629 (1st son)
10. Zhu Yujian, the Longwu Emperor, 1602–1646 (1st son)

== Notes ==
Longwu Emperor House of Zhu; Prince of Tang's line (line of one of the Hongwu Emperor's son) Born: 1602 Died: 1646
Chinese royalty
Preceded by Zhu Shuohuang, Prince Duan	Prince of Tang (First time); 1632–1636	Succeeded by Zhu Yuse, Prince Min
New title	Prince of Nanyang; 1644–1645	Princedom later repealed, for regency of the Ming dynasty
Preceded by Zhu Yuse, Prince Min	Prince of Tang (Second time); 1645	Succeeded by Zhu Yuyue
Regnal titles
Preceded by Zhu Changfang, Prince Min of Lu	Regent of the Southern Ming; 1645	Succeeded by Zhu Yihai, Prince of Lu; Zhu Changqing, Prince of Huai; Zhu Youlang, Prince of Gui
Preceded by Hongguang Emperor	Emperor of the Southern Ming; 1645–1646	Succeeded by Shaowu Emperor
