= Yongli Emperor =

Emperor of Southern Ming from 1646 to 1662

Yongli Emperor 永曆帝

Emperor of the Southern Ming dynasty
- Reign: 24 December 1646 – 1 June 1662 (Note: Dates given here are in the Gregorian calendar.)
- Predecessor: Shaowu Emperor

Prince of Gui
- Tenure: 1646
- Predecessor: Zhu You'ai, Prince Gong
- Successor: Zhu Ciying

Prince of Yongming
- Tenure: 1636–1646
- Born: 1 November 1623
- Died: 1 June 1662 (aged 38)
- Burial: Yongli Tomb
- Spouse: Empress Xiaogangkuang
- Issue Detail: 7 sons
Era dates
- Yongli: (Note: simplified Chinese: 永历; traditional Chinese: 永曆; pinyin: Yǒnglì) 5 February 1647 – 1 June 1662 (Note: On 1 June 1662 (Yongli 16, 15th day of 4th month; 永曆十六年四月十五日), the Yongli Emperor and his son was strangled with bowstrings in Kunming. After his death, the Kingdom of Tungning in Taiwan continued to use the Yongli era name until 1683 (Yongli 37; 永曆三十七年), when the Qing dynasty occupied Taiwan and Zheng Keshuang surrendered to the Qing.)
Posthumous name
- Emperor Yingtian Tuidao Minyi Gongjian Jingwen Weiwu Liren Kexiao Kuang (Note: simplified Chinese: 应天推道敏毅恭俭经文纬武体仁克孝匡皇帝; traditional Chinese: 應天推道敏毅恭檢經文緯武禮仁克孝匡皇帝 (conferred by Zheng Jing))
Temple name
- Zhaozong (Note: Chinese: 昭宗; pinyin: Zhāozōng (conferred by Zheng Jing))
- House: Zhu
- Dynasty: Southern Ming
- Father: Zhu Changying, Prince Duan of Gui
- Mother: Empress Dowager Zhaosheng

Chinese name
- Traditional Chinese: 永曆帝
- Simplified Chinese: 永历帝
Transcriptions
Standard Mandarin
- Hanyu Pinyin: Yǒnglì Dì

The Yongli Emperor (1623–1662), personal name Zhu Youlang, (Note: Chinese: 朱由榔; pinyin: Zhū Yóuláng) was the fourth and last emperor of the Southern Ming dynasty, reigning in turbulent times when the former Ming dynasty was overthrown and the Manchu-led Qing dynasty progressively conquered the entire China proper. He led the remnants of the Ming loyalists with the assistance of peasant armies to resist the Qing forces in southwestern China, but he was then forced to exile to Toungoo Burma and eventually captured and executed by Wu Sangui in 1662. His era name "Yongli" means "perpetual calendar".

Zhu Youlang was the son of Zhu Changying (朱常瀛), the seventh son of the Wanli Emperor, and Empress Dowager Ma. He inherited the title Prince of Gui (桂王) from his brother and lived an obscure life as a minor member of the Ming imperial family until the rebellions of peasant armies, which resulted to the fall of the imperial capital, Beijing, and the suicide of the last Ming emperor, Chongzhen, after the peasant rebel leader Li Zicheng captured Beijing in 1644. The true beneficiaries of the collapse of the Ming were the Qing dynasty, ruled by the emerging nation Manchus from Manchuria. After mass defection from Ming remnants, including a former Ming general, Wu Sangui, who allowed the Qing forces to pass the Ming Great Wall against Li Zicheng, the Qing forces defeated the peasant armies and rapidly expanded to northern China, the Lower Yangtze valley, and Central China. The Ming loyalists continued to resist in southern China, with several former Ming royal members regrouping in the south in attempt to re-establish the Ming governance, but all failed before the rapid Manchu military advance. Youlang ascended the throne in Zhaoqing as the fourth Southern Ming emperor in November 1646.

By 1661, pressed back into Yunnan province, he fled to Burma. A Qing Han Banner army led by Wu Sangui pursued and captured him from the king of Burma, and he was executed in June 1662.

== Historical background ==
In April 1644, the Chongzhen Emperor, the last Ming emperor, committed suicide at Coal Hill as a rebel army entered Beijing. Six weeks later, on 5 June, the army of the Manchus, a people from beyond the Great Wall, entered the city and proclaimed the end of the Ming and the beginning of the Qing. In the following two years, as the Qing extended their control over northern China, the remaining Ming loyalists attempted to regroup in the south, but in rapid succession the Hongguang, Longwu, and Shaowu emperors were captured and executed.

== Campaigns in southern China ==
Zhu Youlang became "Caretaker of the State" on 20 November 1646, following the death of the Longwu emperor. When Longwu's brother then declared himself emperor with the reign-title Shaowu, Youlang himself ascended the throne (24 December 1646) as Yongli emperor. A brief civil war between the two emperors ended a month later when the Qing captured and executed Shaowu.

Zhu Youlang succeeded to the throne with approval by his fathers widow and principal wife Empress Dowager Wang, who was his own adoptive mother, and during his first five years of reign, she acted as his adviser, and it was said that she was "...versed in letters, aware of current events, analytical about tasks and clear in her reasoning. After the Emperor assumed the throne there was nothing in which he did not follow her wishes."

The continuing military pressure of the Qing forced Youlang to withdraw further into the south and west, first to Guilin in Guangxi, then to Jiangxi and Hunan, then south again to Nanning in Guangxi. He had a number of experienced and devoted followers, but became increasingly reliant on the military support of local warlords and bandit chieftains. The best and most effective of these was Li Dingguo, who for five years was highly successful in enlarging Southern Ming territories in the southwest. This success, however, caused the Qing to place the entire region in the hands of the extremely capable former Ming official Hong Chengchou, who was named governor-general of five provinces. By 1658 Youlang had been forced back into Yunnan, on the very edge of China's southwestern frontier.

== Flight and exile in Burma ==
The flight of Prince Gui, the last ruling descendant of the Ming dynasty, who reigned as the Yongli Emperor. The borders shown here are those of provinces in the People's Republic of China.

In 1658 Zhu Youlang retreated to Kunming in Yunnan, from where he sought refuge under the protection of Pindale Min (1608–1661), ninth king of the Taungoo dynasty of Burma. Pindale gave him permission to live at Sagaing, near the Burmese capital of Ava (both near the modern Burmese city of Mandalay), provided his men surrendered their weapons. He finally fled into Burma in 1661.

It soon became apparent to the Burmese that Zhu Youlang intended to carve himself a kingdom in Burma, and war broke out between the exiled prince and his hosts. The Chinese devastated the land around Ava but failed to capture it, thanks to the defence offered by Pindale's mercenary Portuguese artillery (led by a mysterious Mi-thari Kattan, which might be a Burmese attempt at an otherwise unknown "Mister Cotton"). Pindale's attempt to profiteer from the resulting famine led to his overthrow by his brother and chief general, Pye Min (meaning "Prince Pye"), in May 1661. Pye broke the siege and demanded that all the Chinese, with the exception of Youlang himself, swear allegiance to the king of Ava, after which they would be dispersed through the kingdom. The ceremony at which this was to be carried out turned into a disaster, with the Chinese, fearing that the plan was to murder them all, turning on the Burmese. Pye now ordered all the Chinese, again with the exception of Youlang, to be put to death.

At this point, in December 1661, a Qing army of 20,000 under Wu Sangui entered Burma and demanded the surrender of Youlang. Pye summoned his advisors, who pointed out that both the Burmese and the Chinese had previously delivered up persons to each other. In addition, Wu Sangui's army was large, and the Burmese had already suffered enough from the presence of their guest. Accordingly, on 22 January 1662, the last monarch of the Southern Ming, together with his sons and grandsons, were put on boats and forwarded to Wu Sangui's camp near Ava. Thinking that he was being taken to his longtime military protector Li Dingguo, the forlorn emperor only realized his real destination when he arrived at Wu's camp.

== Death ==
Zhu Youlang, Prince of Gui and last serious claimant to the Ming throne, was delivered into the custody of Wu Sangui, a Chinese general who had once served the Ming, and Manchu prince, general, and high minister of state, Aixinga. He was transported to Yunnanfu, the capital of Yunnan, where in June he was personally strangled by Wu Sangui. Wu had played a major role in the overthrow of the dynasty, having opened the gates in the Great Wall to the Qing and later leading the Qing campaign against the Southern Ming. It is said that Youlang scorned Wu in his last moments, saying that he betrayed his people and country, and urged Wu to kill him faster because he was disgusted to see "a traitor's face."

The last Ming dynasty princes who held out against the Qing after Zhu Youlang were Zhu Shugui, Prince of Ningjing and Zhu Hónghuán, Prince of Lu who accompanied Koxinga to Taiwan. Zhu Shugui acted as his representative in the Kingdom of Tungning and performed rites in his name until 1683.

== Consort and issue ==
- Empress Xiaogangkuang, of the Wang clan (孝刚匡皇后 王氏; d. 1662)
  - Zhu Cixuan, Crown Prince Aimin (哀愍太子 朱慈煊; 23 April 1648 – 1 June 1662), third son
  - Zhu Ci?, Prince Ai of Yuan (沅哀王 朱慈𤇥; b. 1650), fourth son
  - Zhu Ciyi, Prince Shang of Mian (沔殤王 朱慈熠; 1654–1655), sixth son
- Consort, of the Dou clan (妃 竇氏)
- Consort, of the Mou clan (妃 某氏)
- Noble Lady, of the Dai clan (貴人 戴氏)
  - Zhu Ciwei, Prince Dao of Fu (涪悼王 朱慈煒; 1654–1655, fifth son
- Concubine, of the Mou clan (宮嬪 某氏)
- Noble Lady, of the Yang clan (貴人 楊氏; d. 1661)
  - Zhu Cizhuo, Prince Chong of Li (澧沖王 朱慈焯; 1654–1656), seventh son
- Noble Lady, of the Liu clan (貴人 劉氏)
- Noble Lady, of the Yang clan (貴人 楊氏)
- First-Class Female Attendant, of the Guo clan (常在 郭氏), personal name Liangpu (良璞)
- Unknown
  - Zhu Cijue, Crown Prince Huaimin (懷愍太子 朱慈爝; b. 1645), first son
  - Zhu Ci?, Crown Prince Daomin (悼愍太子 朱慈; b. 1646), second son

== Notes ==
Yongli Emperor House of Zhu; Prince of Gui's line (line of one of the Wanli Emperor's sons) Born: 1623 Died: 1662
Chinese royalty
New creation	Prince of Yongming; 1636–1646	Succeeded by the peerage of Prince of Gui
Preceded by Zhu You'ai, Prince Gong	Prince of Gui; 1646	Succeeded by Zhu Ciying
Regnal titles
Preceded by Shaowu Emperor	Emperor of the Southern Ming dynasty 1646–1662	None; Southern Ming dynasty was ended in 1662
