= House of Zhu =

Chinese imperial family

- Country: Ming dynasty; Southern Ming
- Founded: 23 January 1368, 658 years ago
- Founder: Hongwu Emperor
- Final ruler: Chongzhen Emperor (Ming dynasty); Yongli Emperor (Southern Ming)
- Titles: Emperor of the Great Ming; Emperor of China
- Deposition: 25 April 1644 (Ming dynasty); 1 June 1662 (Southern Ming)

The House of Zhu was the imperial family that ruled the Ming dynasty of China from 1368 to 1644. After the fall of the Ming capital in 1644, several rump regimes collectively known as the Southern Ming continued to rule parts of southern China until 1662, though their territory gradually diminished. The Ming dynasty was the last imperial dynasty of China ruled by the Han Chinese. Following its collapse, China was conquered by the Manchu-led Qing dynasty, which ruled from 1644 to 1912. Han-led rule was not restored until the fall of the Qing and the establishment of the Republic of China as a nation-state in 1912.

The Hongwu Emperor founded the house after leading a major rebellion against the Mongol-led Yuan dynasty. He and his descendants lifted China to long-term economic prosperity and political stability. Over time, thanks to the polygamy common among the upper classes of Chinese society, the number of male members of the house increased to one hundred thousand. Except for the emperors and heirs to the throne, they were excluded from politics for the sake of government stability. From the late 16th century onwards, economic difficulties and the resulting peasant uprisings brought about a weakening of Ming power, which the Qing dynasty used to seize power in the Central Plains in 1644.

== Origins ==
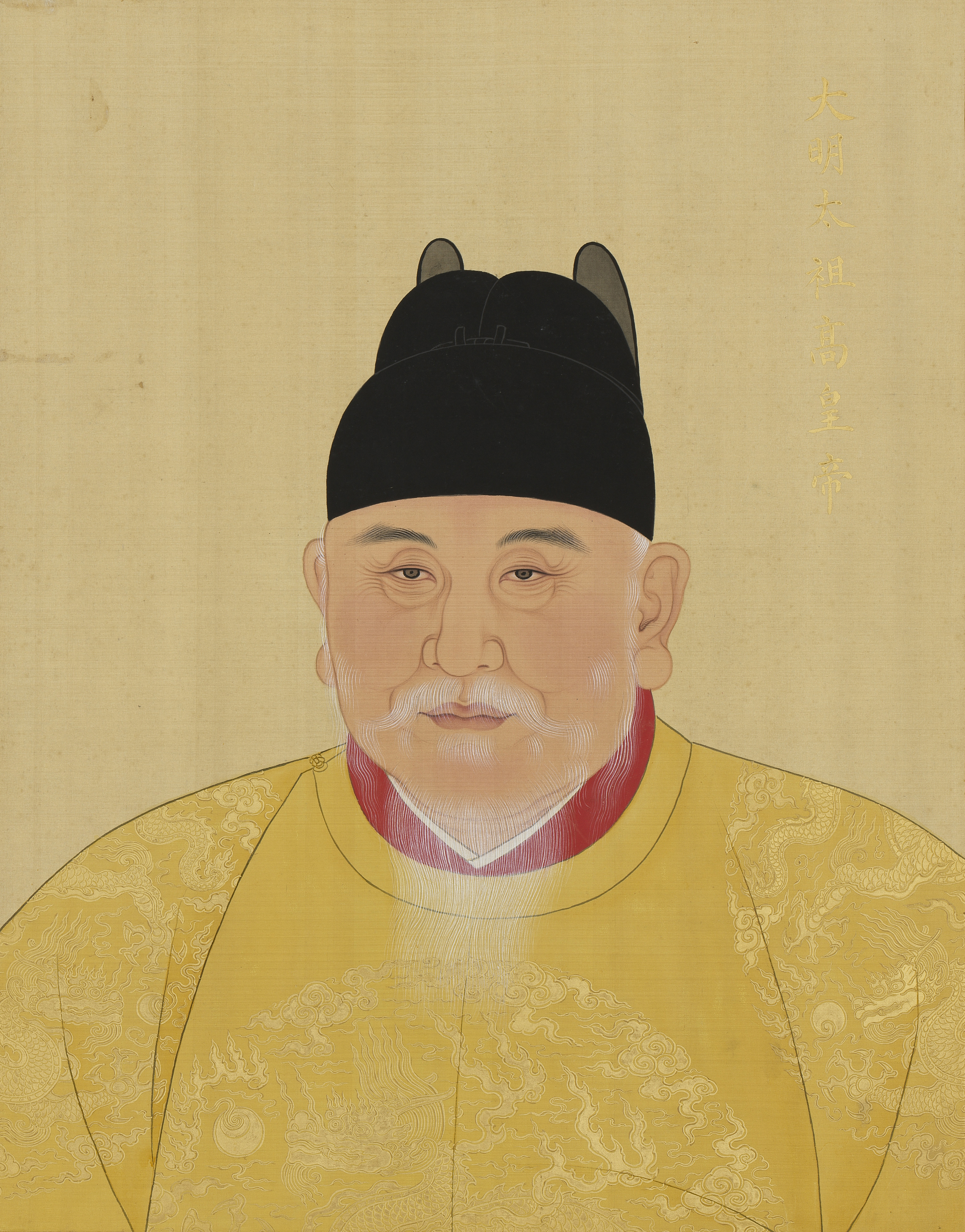
Portrait of the Hongwu Emperor (r. 1368–1398)

The founder of the house was Zhu Yuanzhang, born in 1328 to a poor Chinese peasant family in Zhongli County (鍾離, present-day Fengyang County) in Anhui, located in central China on the lower reaches of the Yangtze River, during the Yuan dynasty. After losing his parents and brother to an epidemic in 1344, Zhu spent time in a Buddhist monastery and also resorted to begging for survival. In 1352, he joined the Red Turban Rebellion and quickly rose to a prominent position among the rebels. He defeated rival rebel leaders and Yuan armies, ultimately forcing the last Yuan emperor to flee from China proper. In 1368, Zhu declared himself emperor of the Ming dynasty in Nanjing and took "Hongwu", or "Vastly Martial", as his era name. By 1381, he had successfully conquered the entire country. In 1361, the rebel Song emperor Han Lin'er had appointed Zhu as the Duke of Wu (吳國公), (Note: Wu was the name of an ancient state and later the region on the lower reaches of the Yangtze River.) and in 1364 Zhu had declared himself the King of Wu (吳王). Despite this, he did not take on the title of emperor of the Wu dynasty, but instead chose the name Ming (明)—meaning "Bright" or "Radiant"—as the name for his new dynasty, with the full name Da Ming (大明)—meaning "Great Radiance".

At the time, the name Ming held various political connotations in China. Its association with brightness and glow evoked the elements of fire, the color red, and the south, all of which symbolized opposition to the ruling Yuan dynasty. This was because in the Chinese system of five elements, the similarity between the words yuan and xuan (dark) linked it to water, the color black, and the north. The geographical location of the Mongols in the north and the Chinese in the south further solidified this association. Additionally, the Hongwu Emperor partially adopted the title of "Great King of Light" (Da Ming wang; 大明王) from Han Shantong, father of Han Lin'er and leader of the White Lotus sect. The term Ming was also used to refer to the Mingjiao, or the "Bright Religion", which was influenced by Manichaeism and played a role in the ideology of the White Lotus and the Red Turban rebellion. By claiming to embody the rebels' belief in the coming of the King of Light, the Hongwu Emperor justified his removal of the Han family from power. Finally, the Emperor's pragmatic adoption of Mongol government practices was reflected in the choice of the dynasty name—the use of an abstract concept as a dynasty name was a non-Chinese tradition that originated with the Jurchens (Jin dynasty, "Golden") and was later adopted by the Mongols (Yuan dynasty, "Beginning").

== Ming dynasty ==
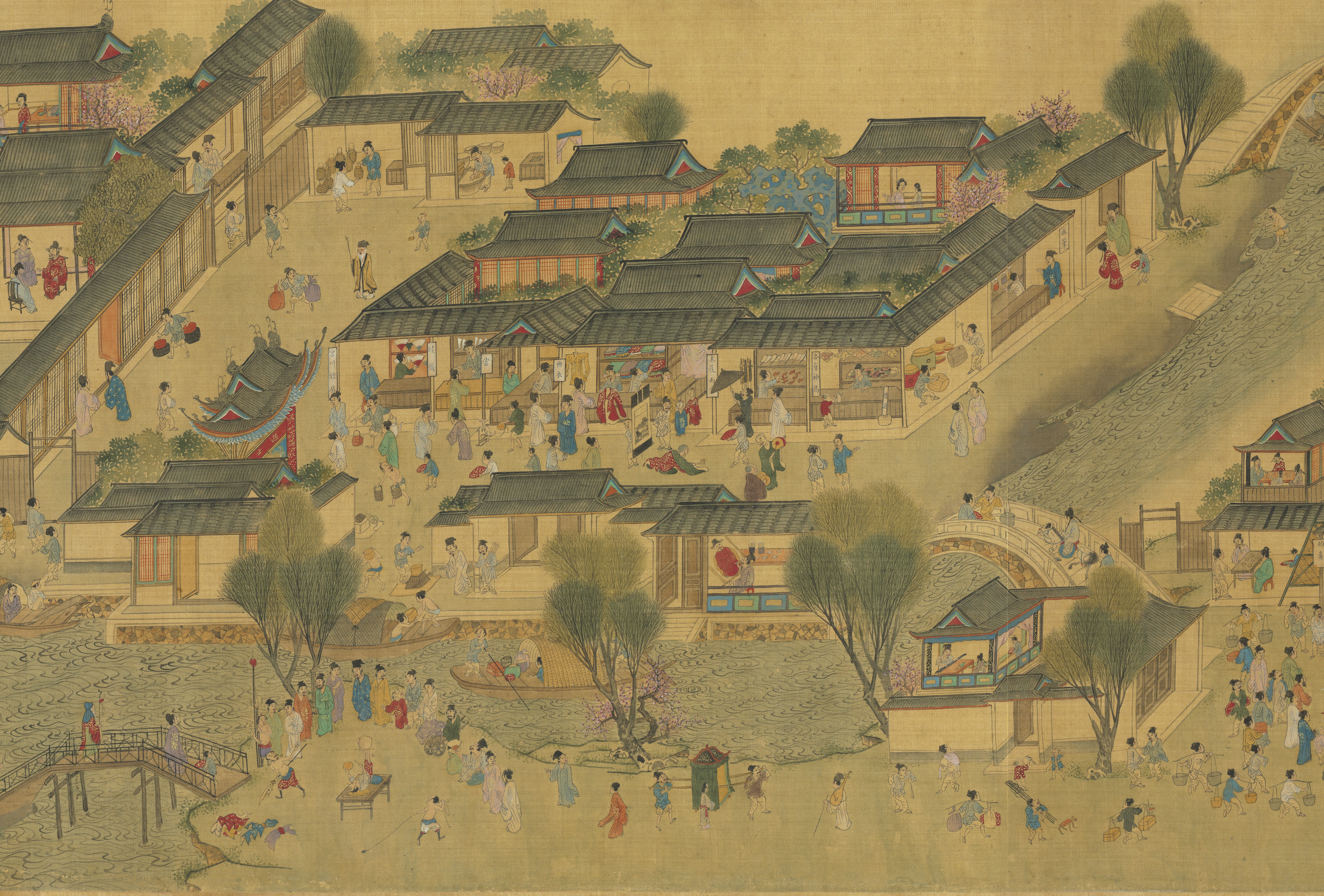
"Suzhou Imitation" of Along the River During the Qingming Festival (蘇州片清明上河圖), depicting urban life of the Ming dynasty.

Under the new dynasty, China experienced significant economic growth, particularly in the southeastern and coastal regions. The economy along the Yangtze River and the Grand Canal saw notable expansion. Agricultural production diversified with the cultivation of cotton, while handicraft industries such as silk weaving and porcelain production developed rapidly.

In the early 15th century, Ming China conquered Manchuria in the north and Đại Việt (present-day northern Vietnam) in the south, although its rule there lasted only about two decades, while also reviving trade and diplomatic relations with Japan, India, and Southeast Asia. This revival was made possible by a large fleet of long-distance trading junks, which by the mid-16th century became frequent targets for Chinese and Japanese pirates who also raided coastal settlements. The second serious threat came from constant attacks by the Mongols in the north. To protect against these raids, the Ming authorities built the Great Wall of China and constructed over five thousand kilometers of trenches.

In January 1556, a strong earthquake struck the northern provinces of China, resulting in the deaths of approximately 830,000 people. This disaster had a significant impact on China's economy in the second half of the 16th century, leading to numerous peasant uprisings. The Manchus took advantage of the weakened Chinese state, and occupied the northern part of the country in 1644.

After the Manchu-led Qing dynasty conquered northern China, the Ming government continued to rule the southern part of the country for several decades until 1661. The remaining members of the Ming imperial family governed the southern provinces, and historians refer to this period as the Southern Ming. The last Ming ruler, the Yongli Emperor, fled to Burma in 1661 and was killed there early the following year.

== Emperors ==
=== Government ===
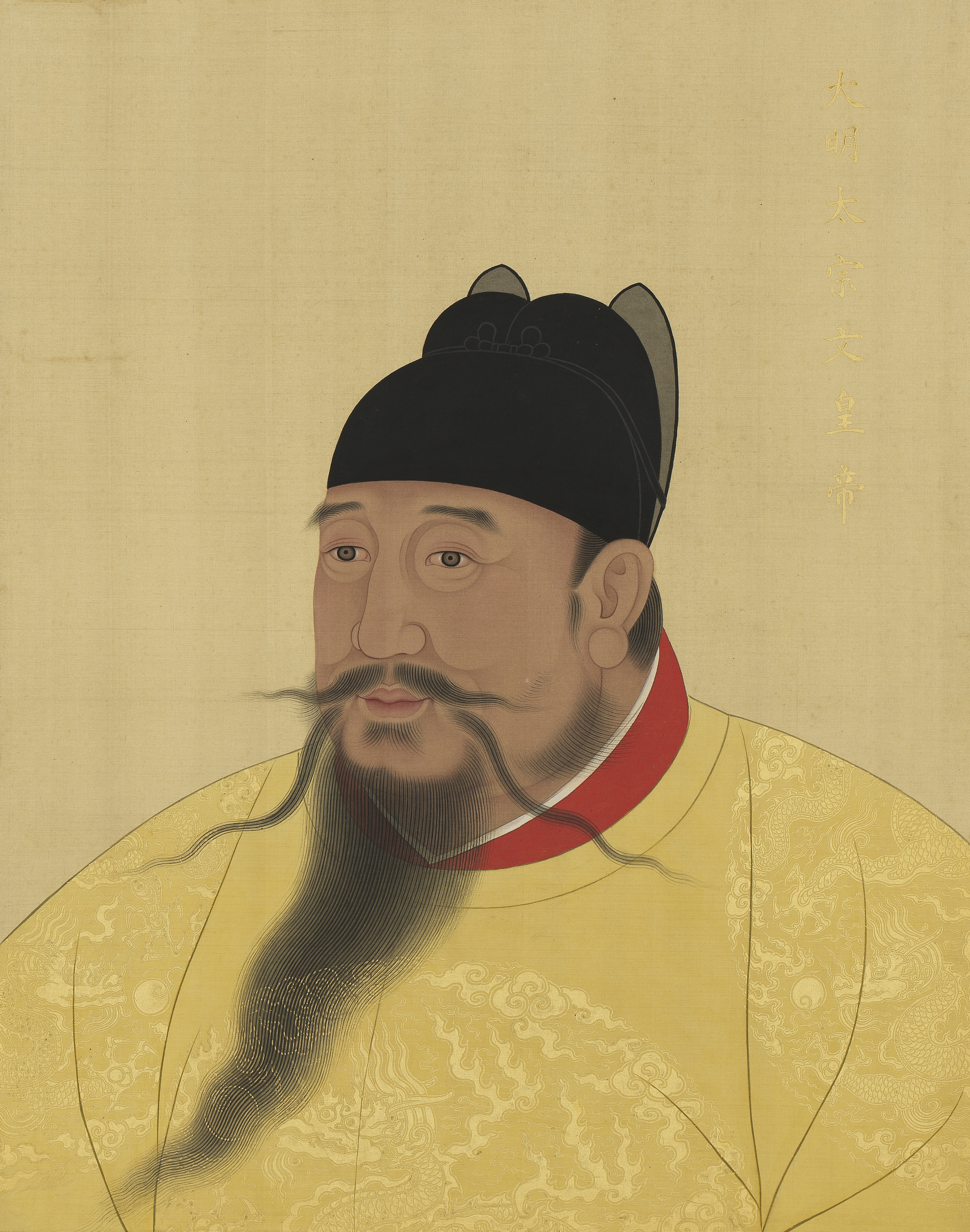
Portrait of the Yongle Emperor (r. 1402–1424)

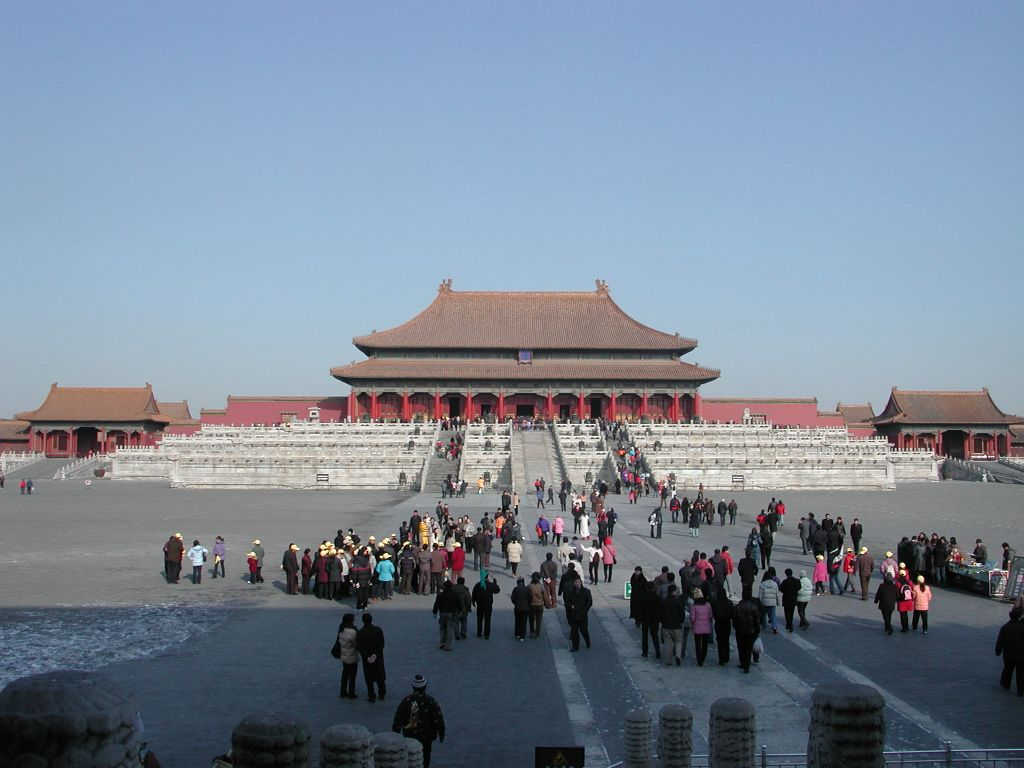
The Hall of Revering Heaven in the Forbidden City, Beijing

The Ming emperors were the ultimate leaders of the country and government, responsible for both military and civilian administration. In theory, the emperor held authority over all officials and generals, and the entire nation followed his decrees. The Hongwu Emperor held power very tightly, but carried out massive purges in 1380. This led to the dissolution of the Central Secretariat, whose leader served as the de facto prime minister. Subsequently, the Emperor assumed full decision-making power for all matters beyond the jurisdiction of individual ministries. The third emperor Yongle personally oversaw both major and minor issues, and became agitated when his ministers did not inform him of small matters. In 1420, the Yongle Emperor moved the capital to Beijing, and most of his successors resided there in the Forbidden City, a 72-hectare complex of palaces and buildings. Before 1420, the emperors lived in a similar complex in Nanjing.

The Yongle Emperor's successors lacked his and the Hongwu Emperor's decisiveness, and their power was limited by traditional expectations. The emperors were not expected to take the lead in determining the direction of the country. Instead, civil officials submitted memorials that already included recommended solutions. The ruler's role was to either approve the proposed solutions or reach an alternative solution with the officials. Similarly, the emperor's appointments of officials and generals were based on proposals from the Ministry of Personnel and the Ministry of War. In the case of high dignitaries, the emperor was given a choice between two to three candidates. Important matters were discussed at official audiences or informal meetings, and it was necessary to have a broad consensus among court dignitaries before making any major decisions.

After the Central Secretariat was abolished, there was no longer a position equivalent to the prime minister. The Hongwu Emperor explicitly forbade its reinstatement, making the emperor the sole authority above the ministers, Censorate, and military offices. The smooth functioning of the government was therefore dependent on the emperor's active participation. The emperor's grand secretaries or high-ranking eunuchs took on the role of coordinator at the top of the administrative apparatus. They were responsible for coordinating the interests of different departments and consulted with the emperor daily on matters under discussion. Their actual power was dependent on the emperor's approval of their decisions. They did not have the authority to issue orders to the ministers on their own.

=== Succession ===
The Hongwu Emperor outlived his eldest son and heir, Zhu Biao. He appointed Zhu Biao's eldest surviving son, Zhu Yunwen, as his successor. In 1398, Zhu Yunwen ascended the throne as the Jianwen Emperor, and the young emperor's government immediately began to aggressively intervene against his uncles. This ultimately led the strongest uncle, Zhu Di, to rebel in 1399. In the ensuing civil war, known as the Jingnan campaign, Zhu Di emerged victorious, and in 1402, his troops captured the capital city of Nanjing. The Jianwen Emperor perished in the fire that engulfed the imperial palace, and Zhu Di succeeded him as the Yongle Emperor. The new emperor made efforts to erase the memory of his predecessor by denying his legitimacy and even retroactively canceling the era of Jianwen.

During the reign of subsequent emperors, the throne was passed down through the principle of primogeniture, where the oldest living son or closest male relative would become the new monarch. This system, however, faced a problem in 1449 when the Mongols captured the sixth emperor Yingzong. After some hesitation, the court decided to install the Emperor's brother as the Jingtai Emperor. The following year, Emperor Yingzong was released from captivity and spent the next seven years under house arrest. In early 1457, the Jingtai Emperor fell ill and Emperor Yingzong was able to stage a palace coup and reclaim the throne. Shortly after, the Jingtai Emperor died.

After the 11th emperor Zhengde died in 1521, a serious conflict arose due to the lack of a direct heir. The late emperor's mother, Lady Zhang, and Grand Secretary Yang Tinghe selected a cousin, Zhu Houcong, as the new ruler. Zhu Houcong ascended the throne as the Jiajing Emperor, and the ministers proposed that he be adopted as the deceased emperor's son in order to maintain the succession of the imperial family in the father-son line. He refused and instead insisted on posthumously appointing his father as emperor, sparking a conflict known as the Great Rites Controversy that lasted for several years. The Jiajing Emperor ultimately resolved the conflict through force—including the execution and exile of protesting officials.

During the reign of the 14th emperor Wanli, a prolonged succession dispute occurred. Despite the customary practice and succession order, the Emperor refused to appoint his eldest son, Zhu Changluo (later the Taichang Emperor), as heir to the throne. Instead, he favored his third son, Zhu Changxun, who was born to his favorite concubine. This dispute lasted for over fifteen years until the Emperor finally yielded to pressure from officials and appointed his eldest son as his heir. The stubbornness of both sides caused a rift between the Emperor and the government, leading to significant damage to the administration of the empire. The Emperor stopped meeting with ministers and refused to appoint new officials to vacant positions, further exacerbating the situation.

== Other members of the family ==
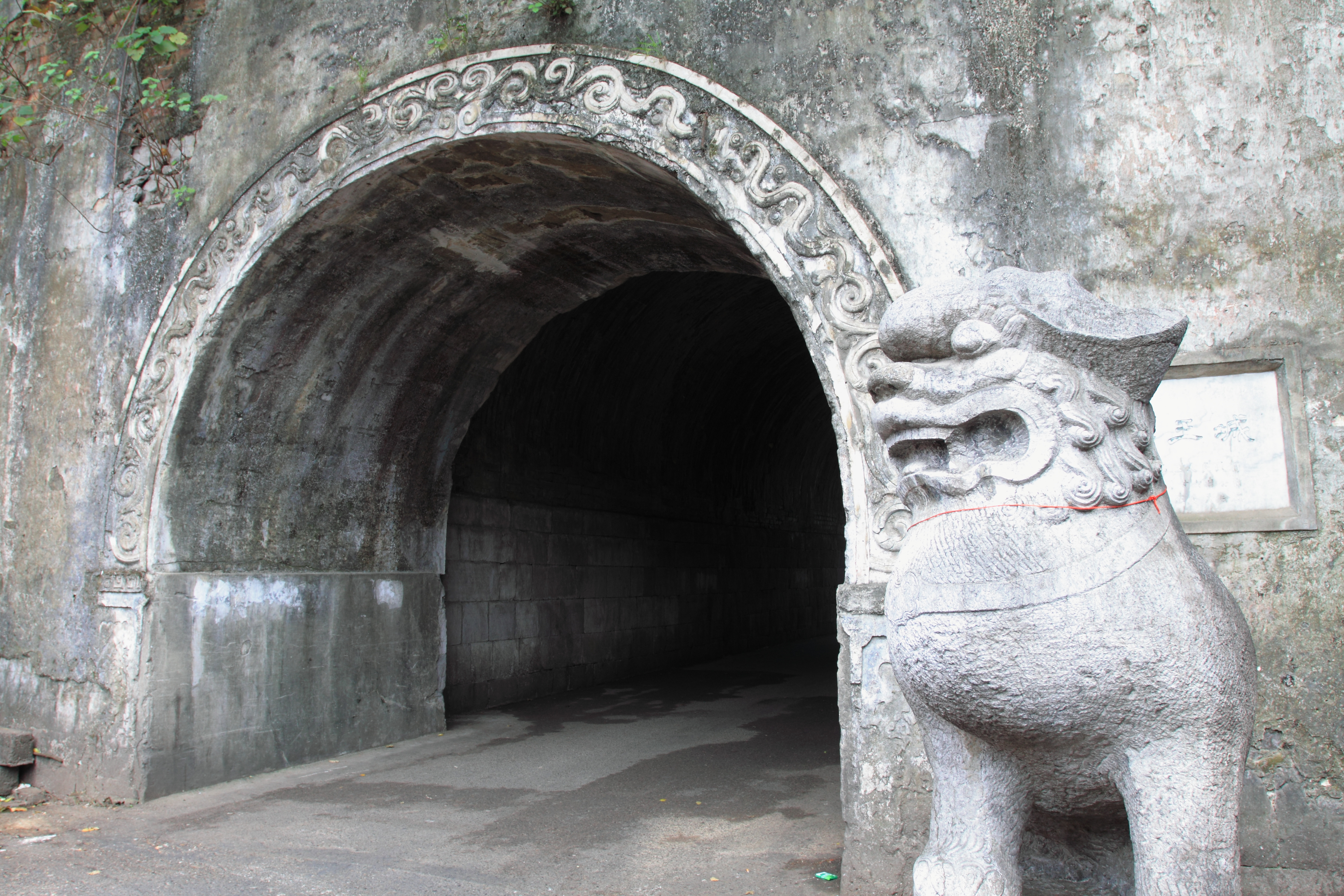
The southern gate of Jingjiang Princes' Palace in Guilin. Unlike other princes of the Ming dynasty, who were all descendants of the Hongwu Emperor, the Princes of Jingjiang were instead descended from his brother.

The Hongwu Emperor appointed his eldest son, Zhu Biao, as the heir to the throne (太子; taizi). His other sons were given titles of princes (親王; qinwang; literally 'prince of imperial blood', also simply 王; wang) and were sent to the provinces with a large entourage and broad, primarily military powers after reaching the age of about twenty. Despite their titles, they did not rule over the regions as feudal princes; local officials continued to be subject to the central government. The princes represented a support for the Hongwu Emperor's personal power independent of the regular civilian and military hierarchy; after the Emperor's death, the Jianwen government attempted to limit their influence, which provoked a rebellion by Zhu Di, Prince of Yan. The Yongle Emperor further limited the regional power of the princes, and they lost their political significance after the Prince of Han unsuccessfully rebelled against his nephew, the Xuande Emperor, in 1426. Apart from the princes, other members of the imperial family were excluded from the administration of the country. It was not until 1595, when the number of imperial family members had grown to tens of thousands, that they were allowed to participate in the civil service examinations, but they could not be appointed to positions in the capital city.

The Ming emperors traditionally appointed their eldest sons as heir to the throne at a young age. Other imperial sons were given the title of prince and were sent to different regions. The sons of these princes, aside from the designated heir (世子; shizi), were in turn granted the title of commandery prince (Note: Commandery was a mid-level administrative unit in ancient and medieval Chinese states. In the 10th century, it was replaced by counties and prefectures, but the word remained a part of some aristocratic titles.) (郡王; junwang). In the following generations, male members of the family were granted titles in six decreasing levels, with each male member of the house holding at least the least senior title as "supporter-commandants of the state" (奉國中尉; fengguo zhongwei). (Note: These six titles were "defenders-general of the state" (鎭國將軍; zhenguo jiangjun), "bulwark-generals of the state" (輔國將軍; fuguo jiangjun), "supporters-general of the state" (奉國將軍; fengguo jiangjun), "defenders-commandant of the state" (鎭國中尉; zhenguo zhongwei), "bulwark-commandants of the state" (輔國中尉; fuguo zhongwei), and "supporter-commandants of the state" (奉國中尉; fengguo zhongwei).)

When the Hongwu Emperor died in 1398, there were 58 members of the family with titles. By the beginning of the 15th century, this number had increased to 127, and by the end of the century, there were over 2000 members with titles. These family members received ample support from the state treasury, as well as judicial immunity and various privileges based on their titles and status. Additionally, from the mid-15th century, they also began to acquire land ownership. According to late Ming authors, there were over 100,000 male descendants of the Hongwu Emperor during their time. Imperial daughters and their husbands also received titles and pensions. As the imperial family grew in size, the costs of their material security significantly increased, primarily affecting the northern regions of China where most of the family resided. For example, in 1562, Shanxi Province spent more money on supporting the imperial family from land tax revenue than on the expenses of provincial, prefectural, and county offices combined. In some northern counties, almost half of all tax income went towards supporting the family.
