= Southern Ming =

Rump state in China during the Ming–Qing transition

Great Ming 大明 (Chinese) Dà Míng (Pinyin)
- 1644–1662
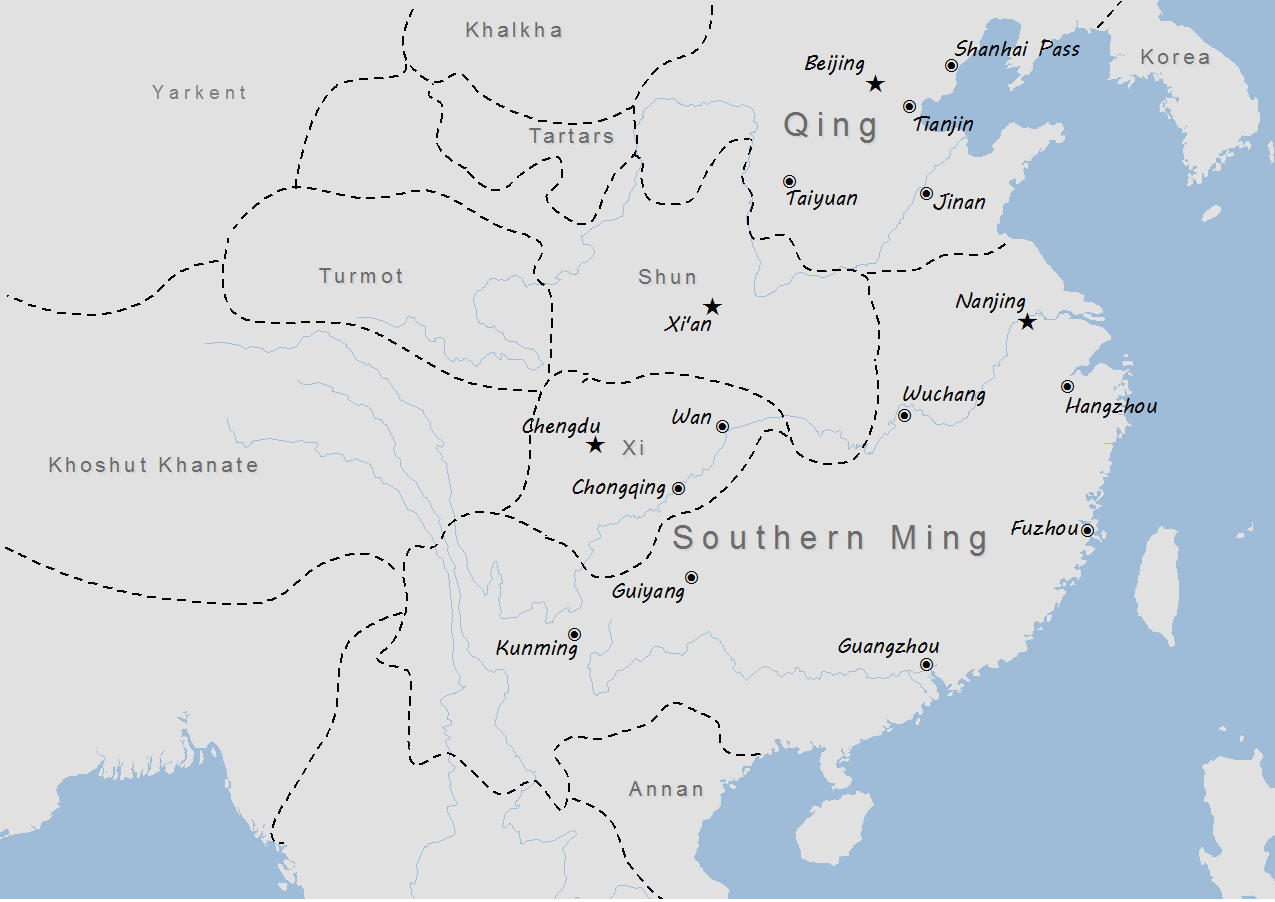
- Various regimes of the Southern Ming, November 1644
- Status: Rump state of the Ming dynasty
- Capital: Yingtian (1644–1645); Tianxing (1645–1646); Guangzhou (1646); Zhaoqing (1646)
- Government: Monarchy
- Emperor
  - 1644–1645: Hongguang Emperor
  - 1645–1646: Longwu Emperor
  - 1646–1647: Shaowu Emperor
  - 1646–1662: Yongli Emperor
- Historical era: Transition from Ming to Qing
  - Li Zicheng captured Beijing: 1644
  - Hongguang Emperor enthroned in Nanjing: 1644
  - Death of Yongli Emperor: 1662
Preceded by	Succeeded by
Ming dynasty	Qing dynasty; Kingdom of Tungning
- Today part of: People's Republic of China; Republic of China; Myanmar

Southern Ming
- Chinese: 南明
Transcriptions
Standard Mandarin
- Hanyu Pinyin: Nán Míng

Dynastic name
- Chinese: 大明
Transcriptions
Standard Mandarin
- Hanyu Pinyin: Dà Míng

Second alternative Chinese name
- Traditional Chinese: 後明
- Simplified Chinese: 后明
- Literal meaning: Later Ming
Transcriptions
Standard Mandarin
- Hanyu Pinyin: Hòu Míng

The Southern Ming, also known in historiography as the Later Ming, officially the Great Ming, was an imperial dynasty of China and a series of rump states of the Ming dynasty that came into existence following the Jiashen Incident of 1644. Peasant rebels led by Li Zicheng who founded the short-lived Shun dynasty captured Beijing and the Chongzhen Emperor committed suicide. The Ming general Wu Sangui then opened the gates of the Shanhai Pass in the eastern section of the Great Wall to the Qing banners, in hope of using them to annihilate the Shun forces. Ming loyalists fled to Nanjing, where they enthroned Zhu Yousong as the Hongguang Emperor, marking the start of the Southern Ming. The Nanjing regime lasted until 1645, when Qing forces captured Nanjing. Zhu fled before the city fell, but was captured and executed shortly thereafter. Later figures continued to hold court in various southern Chinese cities, although the Qing considered them to be pretenders.

The Nanjing regime lacked the resources to pay and supply its soldiers, who were left to live off the land and pillaged the countryside. (Note: It was projected that 7 million taels would be required to fund military activity alone. Revenue of 6 million taels was anticipated based on normal receipts from the areas under Nanjing's control. Severe drought, rebellion, and unsettled conditions combined to ensure that actual revenue was only a fraction of this amount.) The soldiers' behavior was so notorious that they were refused entry by those cities in a position to do so. Court official Shi Kefa obtained modern cannons and organized resistance at Yangzhou. The cannons mowed down a large number of Qing soldiers, but this only enraged those who survived. After the Yangzhou city fell in May 1645, the Manchus started a general massacre pillage in the notorious Yangzhou massacre. Nanjing was captured by the Qing on June 6 and the Hongguang Emperor was taken to Beijing and executed in 1646.

The literati in the provinces responded to the news from Yangzhou and Nanjing with an outpouring of emotion. Some recruited their own militia and became resistance leaders. Shi was lionized and there was a wave of hopeless sacrifice by loyalists who vowed to erase the shame of Nanjing. By late 1646, the heroics had petered out and the Qing advance had resumed. Notable Ming "pretenders" held court in Fuzhou (1645–1646), Guangzhou (1646–1647), and Anlong (1652–1659). The Yongli Emperor was the last and also the longest reigning emperor of the dynasty (1646–1662) and managed to fight against the Qing forces alongside the peasant armies in southwestern China prior to his capture in Myanmar in 1662. The Prince of Ningjing, in the Kingdom of Tungning (based in present-day Tainan, Taiwan) claimed to be the rightful successor to the throne of Ming until 1683, although he lacked real political power. (Note: The historical position of Koxinga's regime on Taiwan is still under debate in academia. The controversy mainly focused on whether the regime should be regarded as a direct continuation of the legitimate dynastic historiography of the Ming dynasty (including the Southern Ming), or treating it as simply an independent polity ruled by the House of Koxinga, as distinct from the rump states those founded by the imperial members of the Ming. The Yongli Emperor was the last generally recognized sovereign of the Southern Ming before his death in 1662.)

The end of the Ming and the subsequent Nanjing regime are depicted in The Peach Blossom Fan, a classic of Chinese literature. The upheaval of this period, sometimes referred to as the Ming–Qing cataclysm, has been linked to a decline in global temperature known as the Little Ice Age. With agriculture devastated by a severe drought, there was manpower available for numerous rebel armies.

== Background ==
The fall of the Ming and the Qing conquest that followed was a period of catastrophic war and population decline in China. China experienced a period of extremely cold weather from the 1620s until the 1710s. Some modern scholars link the worldwide drop in temperature at this time to the Maunder Minimum, an extended period from 1645 to 1715 when sunspots were absent. Whatever the cause, the change in the climate reduced agricultural yields and cut state revenue. It also led to drought, which displaced many peasants. There were a series of peasant revolts in the late Ming, culminating in a revolt led by Li Zicheng which captured Beijing in 1644.

Ming ideology emphasized authoritarian and centralized administration, referred to as "imperial supremacy" or huángjí. However, comprehensive central decision-making was beyond the technology of the time. The principle of uniformity meant that the lowest common denominator was often selected as the standard. The need to implement change on an empire-wide basis complicated any effort to reform the system, leaving administrators helpless to respond in an age of upheaval.

Civil servants were selected by an arduous examination system which tested knowledge of classic literature. While they might be adept at citing precedents from the Zhou dynasty of righteous and unrighteous behavior, they were rarely as knowledgeable when it came to contemporary economic, social, or military matters. Unlike previous dynasties, the Ming had no prime minister. So when a young ruler retreated to the inner court to enjoy the company of his concubines, power devolved to the eunuchs. Only the eunuchs had access to the inner court, but the eunuch cliques were distrusted by the officials who were expected to carry out the emperor's decrees. Officials educated at the Donglin Academy were known for accusing the eunuchs and others of a lack of righteousness.

On April 24, 1644, Li's soldiers breached the walls of the Ming capital Beijing. The Chongzhen Emperor committed suicide the next day to avoid humiliation at their hands. Remnants of the Ming imperial family and some court ministers then sought refuge in the southern part of China and regrouped around Nanjing, the Ming auxiliary capital, south of the Yangtze River. Four different power groups thus emerged:

- The Great Shun (大順), led by Li Zicheng, ruled north of the Huai river.
- The Great Xi (大西), led by Zhang Xianzhong, controlled Sichuan province.
- The Manchu-led Great Qing (大清) controlled the north-east area beyond Shanhai Pass, as well as many of the Mongol tribes.
- The remnants of the Ming dynasty could only survive south of the Huai River, known retroactively as the Southern Ming.

=== Ming loyalist Muslims in the Northwest ===
In 1644, Muslim Ming loyalists in Gansu led by Muslim leaders Milayin (米喇印) and Ding Guodong (丁國棟) led a revolt in 1646 against the Qing during the Milayin rebellion in order to drive the Qing out and restore Zhu Shichuan, Prince of Yanchang to the throne as the emperor. The Muslim Ming loyalists were supported by Hami's Sultan Sa'id Baba (巴拜汗) and his son Turumtay (土倫泰). The Muslim Ming loyalists were joined by Tibetans and Han Chinese in the revolt. After fierce fighting, and negotiations, a peace agreement was agreed on in 1649, and Milayan and Ding nominally pledged allegiance to the Qing and were given ranks as members of the Qing military. When other Ming loyalists in southern China made a resurgence and the Qing were forced to withdraw their forces from Gansu to fight them, Milayan and Ding once again took up arms and rebelled against the Qing. The Muslim Ming loyalists were then crushed by the Qing with 100,000 of them, including Milayin, Ding Guodong, and Turumtay killed in battle.

The Confucian Hui Muslim scholar Ma Zhu (1640–1710) served with the Southern Ming loyalists against the Qing. Zhu Yu'ai, Prince of Gui, was accompanied by Hui refugees when he fled from Huguang to the Burmese border in Yunnan and as a mark of their defiance against the Qing and loyalty to the Ming, they changed their surname to "Ming".

== The Nanjing court (1644–1645) ==
When the news of the Chongzhen emperor's death reached Nanjing in May 1644, the fate of the heir apparent was still unknown. But court officials quickly agreed that an imperial figure was necessary to rally loyalist support. In early June, a caretaker government led by the Prince of Fu was created. (Note: The prince was a grandson of the Wanli Emperor (r. 1573–1620). Wanli's attempt to name Yousong's father as heir apparent had been thwarted by supporters of the Donglin movement because Yousong's father was not Wanli's eldest son. Although this was three generations earlier, Donglin officials in Nanjing nonetheless feared that the prince might retaliate against them.) By the time he arrived in the vicinity of Nanjing, the prince could already count on the support of both Ma Shiying and Shi Kefa. He entered the city on June 5 and accepted the title "protector of the state" the next day. Prodded by some court officials, the Prince of Fu immediately begin to consider ascending the throne. The prince had a problematic reputation in terms of Confucian morality, so some members of the Donglin faction suggested the Prince of Lu as an alternative. Other officials noted that the Prince of Fu, as next in line by blood, was clearly the safer choice. In any case, the so-called "righteousness" faction was not keen to risk a confrontation with Ma, who arrived in Nanjing with a large fleet on June 17. The Prince of Fu was crowned as the Hongguang emperor on June 19. It was decided that the next lunar year would be the first year of the Hongguang reign.

The Hongguang court proclaimed that its goal was "to ally with the Tartars to pacify the bandits," that is, to seek cooperation with Qing military forces in order to annihilate rebel peasant militia led by Li Zicheng and Zhang Xianzhong.

Because Ma was the emperor's main supporter, he started to monopolize the royal court's administration by reviving the functions of the remaining eunuchs. This resulted in rampant corruptions and illegal dealings. Moreover, Ma engaged in intense political bickering with Shi, who was affiliated with the Donglin movement.

This displacement of troops facilitated the Qing capture of Yangzhou. This resulted in the Yangzhou massacre and the death of Shi in May 1645. It also led directly to the demise of the Nanjing regime. After the Qing armies crossed the Yangtze River near Zhenjiang on June 1, the emperor fled Nanjing. Qing armies led by the Manchu prince Dodo immediately moved toward Nanjing, which surrendered without a fight on June 8, 1645. A detachment of Qing soldiers then captured the fleeing emperor on June 15, and he was brought back to Nanjing on June 18. The fallen emperor was later transported to Beijing, where he died the following year.

The official history, written under Qing sponsorship in the eighteenth century, blames Ma's lack of foresight, his hunger for power and money, and his thirst for private revenge for the fall of the Nanjing court.

Zhu Changfang, Prince of Lu, declared himself regent in 1645, but surrendered the next year.

== The Fuzhou court (1645–1646) ==
Qing conquest of the Southern Ming, 1645–1683

In 1644, Zhu Yujian was a ninth-generation descendant of Zhu Yuanzhang who had been put under house arrest in 1636 by the Chongzhen emperor. He was pardoned and restored to his princely title by the Hongguang emperor. When Nanjing fell in June 1645, he was in Suzhou en route to his new fiefdom in Guangxi. When Hangzhou fell on July 6, he retreated up the Qiantang River and proceeded to Fujian from a land route that went through northeastern Jiangxi and mountainous areas in northern Fujian. Protected by General Zheng Hongkui, on July 10 he proclaimed his intention to become regent of the Ming dynasty, a title that he formally received on July 29, a few days after reaching Fuzhou. He was enthroned as emperor on August 18, 1645. Most Nanjing officials had surrendered to the Qing, but some followed the Prince of Tang in his flight to Fuzhou.

In Fuzhou, the Prince of Tang was under the protection of Zheng Zhilong, a Chinese sea trader with exceptional organizational skills who had surrendered to the Ming in 1628 and recently been made an earl by the Hongguang emperor. Zheng Zhilong and his Japanese wife Tagawa Matsu had a son, Zheng Sen. The pretender, who was childless, adopted Zheng Zhilong's eldest son Zheng Sen, granted him the imperial surname, and gave him a new personal name: Chenggong. The name Koxinga is derived of his title "lord of the imperial surname" (guóxìngyé).

In October 1645, the Longwu Emperor heard that another Ming pretender, Zhu Yihai, Prince of Lu, had named himself regent in Zhejiang, and thus represented another center of loyalist resistance. But the two regimes failed to cooperate, making their chances of success even lower than they already were.

In February 1646, Qing armies seized land west of the Qiantang River from the Lu regime and defeated a ragtag force representing the Longwu emperor in northeastern Jiangxi. In May of that year Qing forces besieged Ganzhou, the last Ming bastion in Jiangxi. In July, a new Southern Campaign led by Manchu Prince Bolo sent the Zhejiang regime of Prince Lu into disarray and proceeded to attack the Longwu regime in Fujian. Zheng Zhilong, the Longwu emperor's main military defender, fled to the coast. On the pretext of relieving the siege of Ganzhou in southern Jiangxi, the Longwu court left their base in northeastern Fujian in late September 1646, but the Qing army caught up with them. Longwu and his empress were summarily executed in Tingzhou (western Fujian) on 6 October. After the fall of Fuzhou on 17 October, Zheng Zhilong defected to the Qing but his son Koxinga continued to resist. Through Zheng networks, the Southern Ming continued to enjoy a privileged diplomatic position vis-a-vis Tokugawa Japan, who exempted Southern Ming ships from the ban on exports of weapons and strategic materials, and from the ban on Japanese wives of Southern Ming Chinese men remaining in Japan. The Zheng were also able to recruit Japanese troops, particularly from their strongest sympathizers, the Satsuma and Mito domains.

== The Guangzhou court (1646–1647) ==
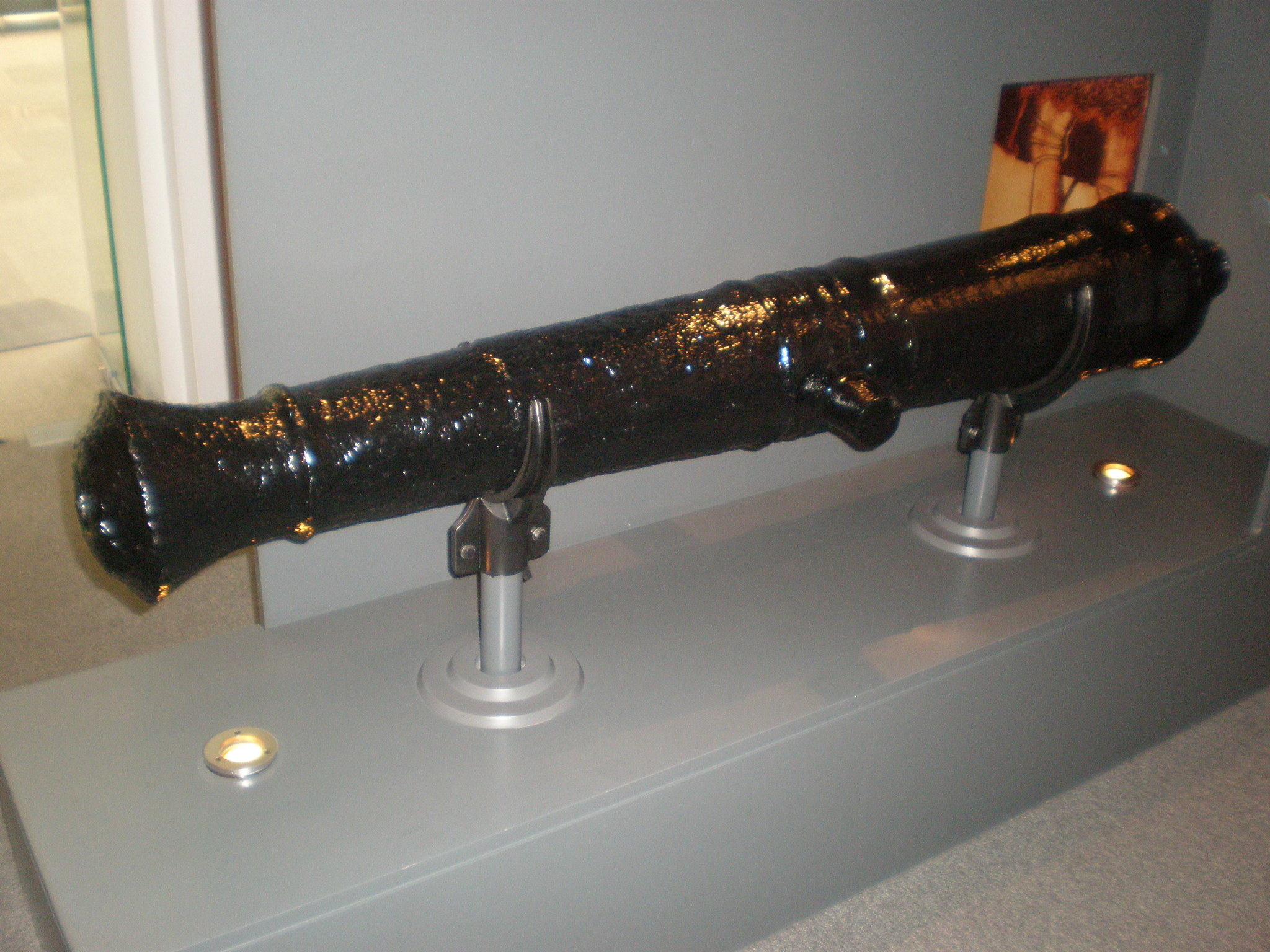
A cannon cast in 1650 by the southern Ming when remnants of the Ming regime were based in Guangdong. (From the Hong Kong Museum of Coastal Defence.)

The Longwu Emperor's younger brother Zhu Yuyue, who had fled Fuzhou by sea, soon founded another Ming regime in Guangzhou, the capital of Guangdong Province, proclaiming the era of Shaowu (紹武) on 11 December 1646. Short of official costumes, the court had to purchase robes from local theater troupes. On 24 December, Zhu Youlang, Prince of Gui established the Yongli (永曆) regime in the same vicinity. The two Ming regimes fought each other until 20 January 1647, when a small Qing force led by former Southern Ming commander Li Chengdong (李成棟) captured Guangzhou, causing the Shaowu Emperor to commit suicide, and sending the Yongli emperor fleeing to Nanning in Guangxi.

The Portuguese in Macao provided military aid in the form of cannons to the two courts established by the Princes of Gui and Tang in exchange for tax exemption, more land around Macao and conversions to Catholicism. The Empress dowager, the two Empresses and the crown prince converted to Catholicism, and the Jesuit missionaries carried letters to the Pope and the Portuguese asking for aid.

== The Nanning court (1646–1651) ==
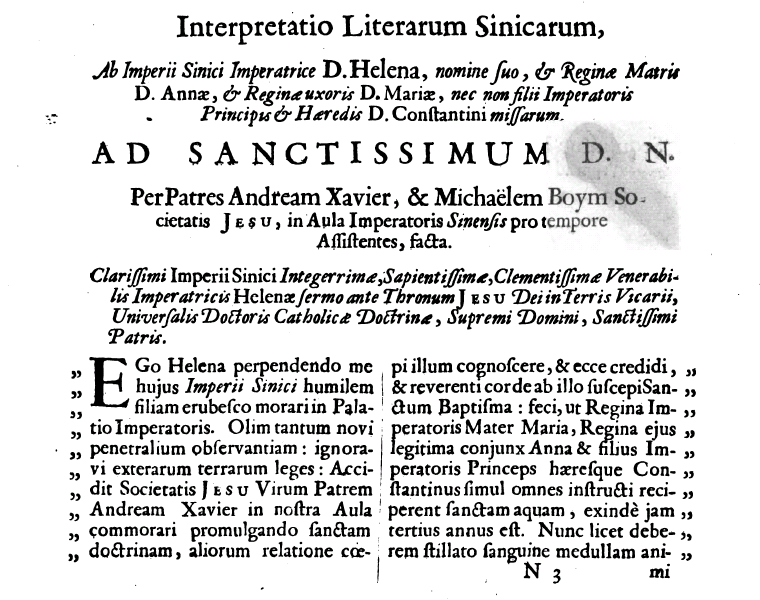
Letter from the Empress Dowager Helena Wang (the "honorary mother"(孝正皇太后王氏) of the Yongli emperor) to the Pope with a request for help. November 1650. Latin translation by Michał Boym.

Li Chengdong suppressed more loyalist resistance in Guangdong in 1647, but mutinied against the Qing in May 1648 because he resented having been named only regional commander of the province he had conquered. The concurrent rebellion of another former Ming general in Jiangxi helped the Yongli regime to retake most of southern China, leaving the Qing in control of only a few enclaves in Guangdong and southern Jiangxi. But this resurgence of loyalist hopes was short-lived. New Qing armies managed to reconquer the central provinces of Huguang (present-day Hubei and Hunan), Jiangxi, and Guangdong in 1649 and 1650. The Yongli emperor fled to Nanning and from there to Guizhou. On 24 November 1650, Qing forces led by Shang Kexi – the father of one of the "Three Feudatories" who would rebel against the Qing in 1673 – captured Guangzhou after a ten-month siege and massacred the city's population, killing as many as 70,000 people.

== Yunnan and Burma exile (1651–1661) ==
Though the Qing under the leadership of Prince Regent Dorgon (1612–1650) had successfully pushed the Southern Ming deep into southern China, Ming loyalism was not dead yet. In early August 1652, Li Dingguo, who had served as general in Sichuan under bandit king Zhang Xianzhong (d. 1647) and was now protecting the Yongli emperor, retook Guilin (Guangxi province) from the Qing. Within a month, most of the commanders who had been supporting the Qing in Guangxi reverted to the Ming side. Despite occasional successful military campaigns in Huguang and Guangdong in the next two years, Li failed to retake important cities.

In 1653, the Qing court put Hong Chengchou in charge of retaking the southwest. Headquartered in Changsha (in what is now Hunan province), he patiently built up his forces; only in late 1658 did well-fed and well-supplied Qing troops mount a multipronged campaign to take Guizhou and Yunnan. In late January 1659, a Qing army led by Manchu prince Doni took the capital of Yunnan, sending the Yongli emperor fleeing into nearby Burma, which was then ruled by King Pindale Min of the Toungoo dynasty. The last sovereign of the Southern Ming stayed there until 1662, when he was captured and executed by Wu Sangui, whose surrender to the Qing in April 1644 had allowed Dorgon to start the Qing conquest of Ming.

== Kingdom of Tungning (1661–1683) ==
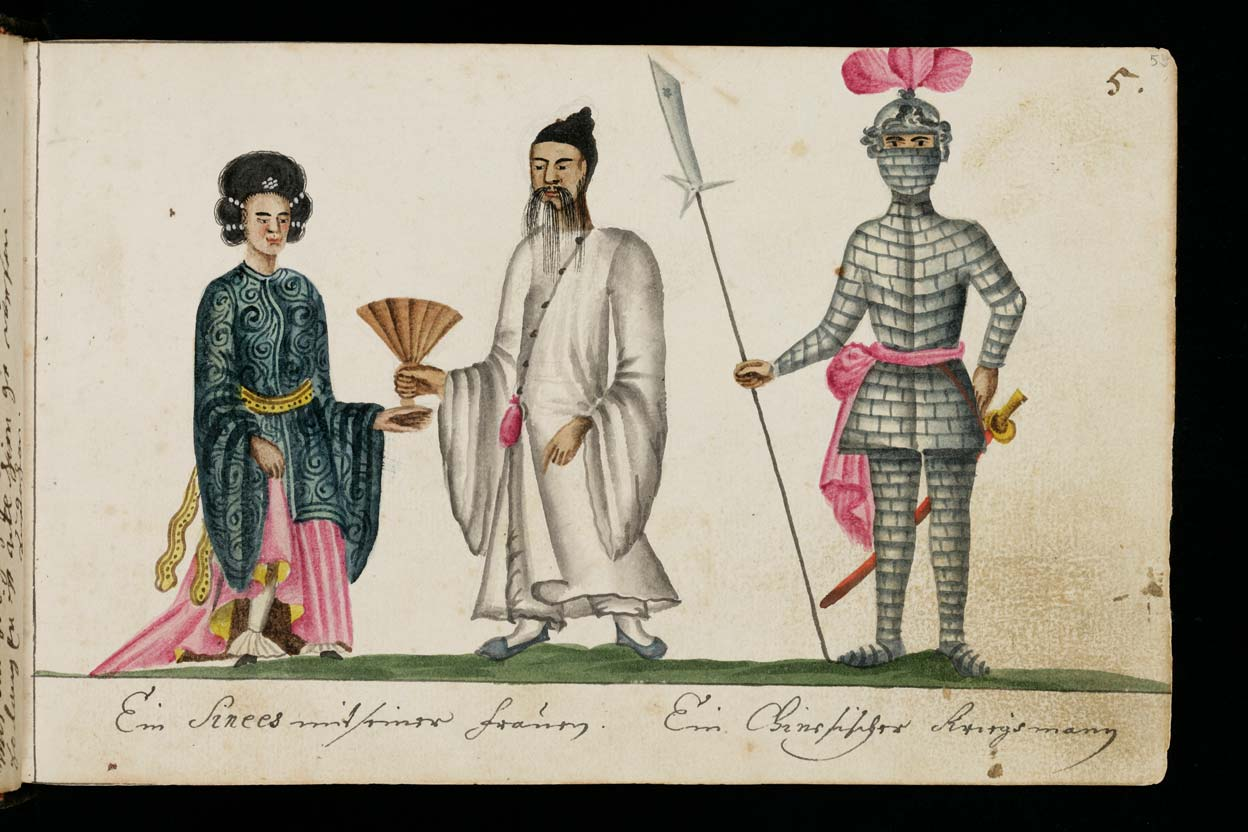
Depiction of a Southern Ming soldier and a Chinese man and his wife, by Georg Franz Müller

Koxinga (Zheng Chenggong), son of Zheng Zhilong, was awarded with the titles: Marquis of Weiyuan, Duke of Zhang, and Prince of Yanping by the Yongli Emperor.

Koxinga then decided to take Taiwan from the Dutch. He launched the Siege of Fort Zeelandia, defeating the Dutch and driving them out of Taiwan. He then established the Kingdom of Tungning on the site of the former Dutch colony. The Ming princes who accompanied Koxinga to Taiwan were Zhu Shugui, Prince of Ningjing and Zhu Honghuan, son of Zhu Yihai, Prince of Lu.

Koxinga's grandson Zheng Keshuang surrendered to the Qing dynasty in 1683 and was rewarded by the Kangxi Emperor with the title Duke of Hanjun and he and his soldiers were inducted into the Eight Banners. The Qing sent the 17 Ming princes still living on Taiwan back to mainland China where they spent the rest of their lives.

== Southeast Asia ==
The Ming loyalist Chinese pirate Yang Yandi (Dương Ngạn Địch) and his fleet sailed to Vietnam to leave the Qing dynasty in March 1682, first appearing off the coast of Tonkin in northern Vietnam. According to the Vietnamese account, Vũ Duy Chí (武惟志), a minister of the Vietnamese Lê dynasty, came up with a plan to defeat the Chinese pirates by sending more than 300 beautiful singing girls and prostitutes with red handkerchiefs to the Chinese pirate junks on small boats. The Chinese pirates and northern Vietnamese (Tonkinese) girls had sex, but the women wet the gun barrels of the pirate ships with their handkerchiefs. They then left in the same boats. The Trinh Lords navy then attacked the Chinese pirate fleet which was unable to fire back with their wet guns. The Chinese pirate fleet, originally 206 junks, was reduced to 50–80 junks by the time it reached South Vietnam's Quang Nam and the Mekong Delta. The Chinese pirates having sex with north Vietnamese women may also have transmitted a deadly epidemic from China which ravaged the Tonkin regime of north Vietnam. French and Chinese sources say a typhoon contributed to the loss of ships along with the disease. The Nguyễn court of southern Vietnam allowed Yang (Duong) and his surviving followers to resettle in Đồng Nai, which had been newly acquired from the Khmers. Duong's followers named their settlement as Minh Huong, to recall their allegiance to the Ming dynasty.

== See also ==
- Ming dynasty
  - House of Zhu
- Transition from Ming to Qing
- List of Southern Ming emperors
  - Emperor's family tree
- History of Taiwan
  - Koxinga Ancestral Shrine
  - Kingdom of Tungning
- Iquan's Party
- Empress Dowager Ma (Southern Ming)

== Notes ==
Preceded by Ming dynasty	Dynasties in Chinese history 1644–1662	Succeeded by Qing dynasty Kingdom of Tungning
