= Palace of Earthly Honour =

Residence of imperial consorts in the Forbidden City

Coordinates: 39.9193°N 116.3896°E

The Palace of Earthly Honour (Chinese: 翊坤宫; pinyin: Yìkūngōng), also known as Yikun Palace, is one of the Six Western Palaces in the inner court of the Forbidden City. It is situated north of the Palace of Eternal Longevity, south of the Palace of Gathering Elegance, east of the Palace of Eternal Spring, northeast of the Hall of the Supreme Principle and southeast of the Palace of Universal Happiness.

== History ==
This residence was built in 1420 and was originally called the "Palace of Ten Thousand Peace" (万安宫; Wàn'āngōng). It received its current name in 1535, during the reign of the Jiajing Emperor. The new name corresponds with the trigram "kun" ("earth") present in the name of the Palace of Earthly Tranquility (traditionally the living quarters of the empress during the Ming and early Qing dynasties) and means "assisting the ruler of the earth"; as such, the name of the palace indicates the status of an imperial consort being deputy empress. Paradoxally, it wasn't a residence exclusively reserved for high-ranking imperial consorts (noble consorts, imperial noble consorts or empresses).

In 1885, the palace was connected with the Palace of Gathering Elegance, the residence of Empress Dowager Cixi. In 1889, it was the location for a selection of imperial consorts.

=== Incidents ===
On 4 May 2013, an armed man broke into the main hall through a window. During the break-in, the Qing dynasty brass-plated gilded flowery chime (made in Great Britain in the 18th century) fell down from a table. Thereafter, the glass window was substituted, and the gilded flowery chime was sent to storage for expertise.

== Residents ==
=== Ming dynasty ===
Year	Emperor	Imperial consort	Note
1560–1572	Longqing	Empress Dowager Xiaoding	
1581–1620	Wanli	Noble Consort Zheng	
1629–1644	Chongzhen	Noble Consort Yuan	

=== Qing dynasty ===
Year	Emperor	Imperial consort	Note
1677–1722	Kangxi	Consort Yi	
1722–1725	Yongzheng	Imperial Noble Consort Dunsu	
1735–1766	Qianlong	Empress Nara	After cutting her hair during the southern tour of 1765, she was confined to this palace until her death
1763–1795	Qianlong	Consort Dun	She began supervising lower-ranked imperial consorts in 1775
1767–1774	Qianlong	Imperial Noble Consort Qinggong	
1801–1820	Jiaqing	Concubine An	She lived here under supervision as a first class attendant
1822–1850	Daoguang	Consort Xiang	

== See also ==
- Imperial Chinese harem system
- Forbidden City
