= Zhu Cilang =

Crown Prince of China from 1630 to 1644

Zhu Cilang 朱慈烺

Crown Prince of the Ming dynasty
- Tenure: 1630–1644
- Predecessor: Crown Prince Zhu Changluo (Note: The Taichang Emperor originally planned on 4 October 1620 to create his eldest son, Zhu Youjiao (the Tianqi Emperor), as the crown prince. On 26 September, after the Taichang Emperor died, Zhu Youjiao inherited but did not become the crown prince. Three crown princes of the Tianqi Emperor were all named posthumously, and the last official crown prince was Zhu Changluo.)
- Successor: Crown Prince Zhu Cixuan (Southern Ming Yongli Emperor's Crown Prince)

Prince of Song
- Tenure: 1644
- Born: 26 February 1629
- Died: June 1644 (aged 15)
- Burial: Unknown
Names
- Zhu Cilang
Era dates
- Yixing: (Note: simplified Chinese: 义兴; traditional Chinese: 義興; pinyin: Yìxīng) June 1644
Posthumous name
- Crown Prince Xianmin (Note: simplified Chinese: 献愍太子; traditional Chinese: 獻愍太子 (conferred by the Hongguang Emperor)); Emperor Dao (Note: Chinese: 悼皇帝; pinyin: Dào Huángdì (conferred by Prince of Lu))
- House: Zhu
- Father: Chongzhen Emperor
- Mother: Empress Xiaojielie

Chinese name
- Chinese: 朱慈烺
Transcriptions
Standard Mandarin
- Hanyu Pinyin: Zhū Cílǎng

Zhu Cilang (26 February 1629 – June 1644) was a crown prince of the Ming dynasty. He was the eldest son of the Chongzhen Emperor and Lady Zhou, Empress Xiaojielie, and he was made the crown prince in 1630.

== Attempts to move south ==
Peasant rebellions were ravaging northern China and threatening the Ming capital of Beijing. In February 1644, rebel leader Li Zicheng founded the Shun dynasty in Xi'an and proclaimed himself king. In March, his armies captured the important city of Taiyuan in Shanxi. The capture of Taiyuan by Li Zicheng's forces gave his campaign additional momentum; garrisons began to surrender to him without a fight. Through February and March 1644, the Chongzhen Emperor and the court discussed proposals to move the court south to Nanjing. Officials Li Mingrui and Li Banghua proposed that the Chongzhen Emperor retreat south and set up an alternative Southern Ming regime in Nanjing while the crown prince be left behind in Beijing as jianguo (監國; regent) to protect the northern capital and guard the imperial altars. This proposal was rejected by the emperor.

An alternative proposal was made when Li Banghua submitted a secret memorial to the emperor that the role be reversed, proposing that the emperor stay behind in Beijing to lead the Ming defense while the crown prince would be sent south. Chongzhen secretly wanted to retreat south himself, but not wanting to appear weak to the court and faced with oppositions of the majority of the capital officials, he angrily rejected the suggestion and all further discussions to move the court. On 9 April, the general Li Jiantai brought up the proposal to transfer the court to the south one last time with the crown prince leading ahead and then the emperor following behind. However, this was also rejected after one official Guang Shiheng accused the proponents of plotting to force the emperor to abdicate and installing the crown prince as new emperor as was done with Emperor Suzong of Tang during the An Lushan Rebellion.

In April 1644, the army of the rebel Li Zicheng were approaching the capital through Juyong Pass. On 23 April, the Chongzhen Emperor held his last audience with his ministers. Li Zicheng offered Chongzhen the opportunity to surrender, but the emperor refused. The following day, the rebel army attacked the capital. The Chongzhen Emperor ordered the crown prince and his two brothers: Zhu Cijiong (朱慈炯) and Zhu Cizhao (朱慈炤) to hide in the home of relatives, and summoned the rest of his family. Rather than let them be captured by the rebels, the emperor started killing the female members of his family, concubines and consorts. Using his sword, he killed Consort Yuan and Princess Kunyi, and severed the arm of Princess Changping. Empress Zhou committed suicide by hanging herself in her palace in the Forbidden City. The emperor was said to have walked to Meishan, a small hill in present-day Jingshan Park, where he hanged himself on a tree.

The easy transition between the Ming and Qing dynasties has been ascribed to the Chongzhen Emperor's refusal to move southward when his capital had been under rebel threat. This allowed the Qing dynasty to capture an entire corps of qualified civil servants to administer the country, and also ensured that the Southern Ming pretenders would suffer from infighting due to their weak claims on the throne. A large émigré elite of northerners in the south would also have increased the probability of an aggressive policy of reconquest to regain their northern homelands.

== Final fate ==
Upon taking Beijing on 25 April, Li Zicheng took the crown prince and his brothers as hostages. In their meeting, Li asked Zhu what caused his family to lose the Mandate of Heaven. The crown prince replied, "Because we made the mistake of employing treacherous ministers like Zhou Yanru." Li kept Zhu alive during his occupation of the city and created him Prince of Song (宋王). Zhu was held in Li's camp before his defeat by the Manchu Qing under Prince-Regent Dorgon and former Ming general Wu Sangui at the Battle of Shanhai Pass on 27 May 1644.

After the battle, Zhu fell into the hands of Wu Sangui who wanted to restore him to the throne, but Dorgon rejected this idea and was determined to claim the Mandate of Heaven for the Qing. News of Li's defeat reached Beijing and the residents including the former Ming bureaucrats optimistically expected to receive Wu's army and the Ming crown prince. Instead, they were greeted by the forces of Dorgon entering the city's gate. Dorgon established his nephew Shunzhi Emperor on the Chinese throne. Wu Sangui took the prince to Shanxi, where Wu was charged with subduing the last Shun remnants. Zhu Cilang died in Ningjiawan, Shaanxi in June 1644.

Zhu Cilang was posthumously created Crown Prince Xianmin (獻愍太子) meaning the "Dedicated" and "Commiserated" Crown Prince by the Hongguang Emperor of the Southern Ming dynasty and later Emperor Dao (悼皇帝) meaning the "mournful" emperor by the Prince of Lu.

Zhu Cilang's crown princess was Ning Hong's (寧浤) daughter, Consort Ning (寧妃) who died at 19.
