= Hall of the Supreme Principle =

Residence of imperial consorts in the Forbidden City

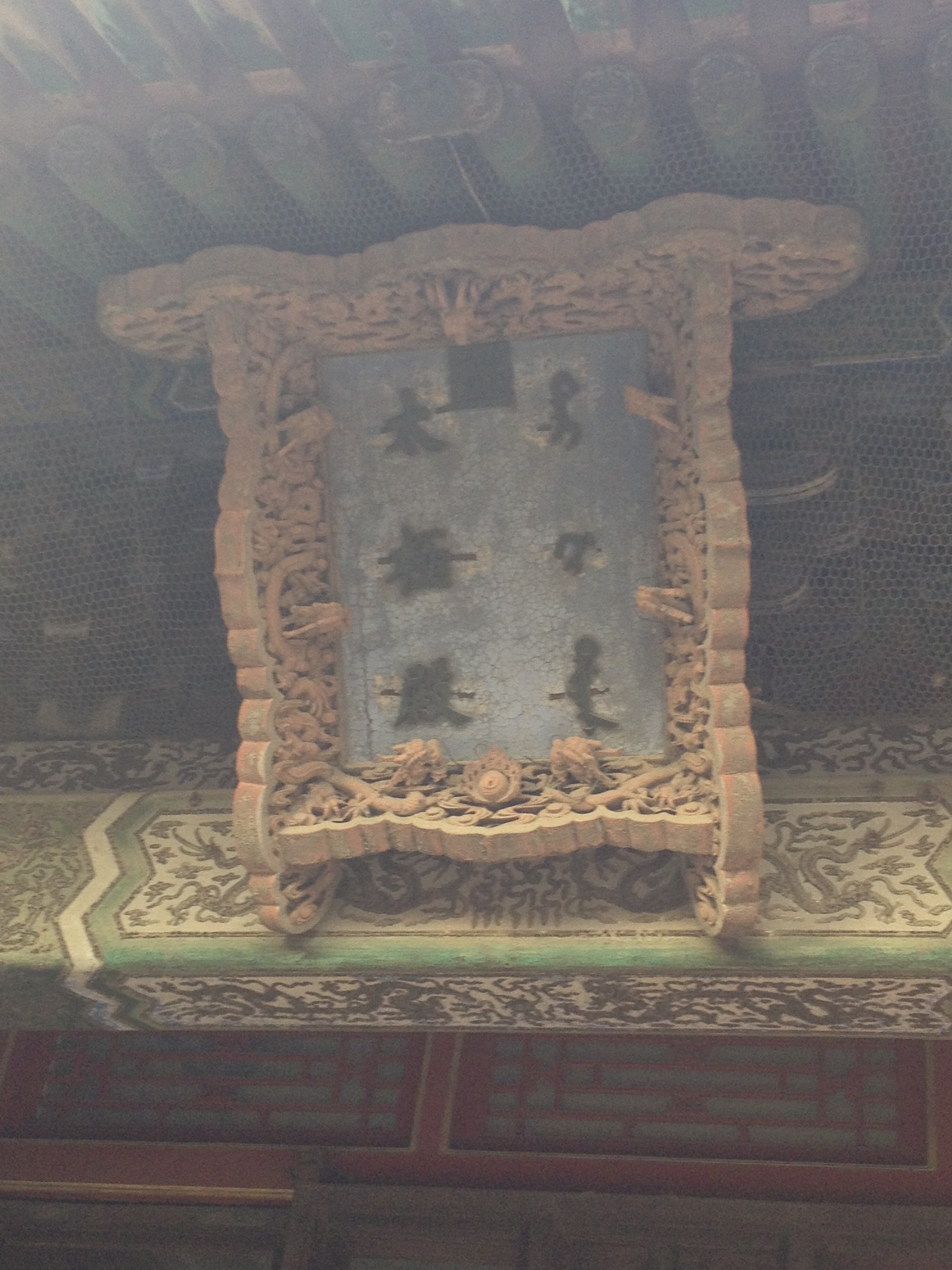
Plaque of the Hall of the Supreme Principle

The Hall of the Supreme Principle (simplified Chinese: 太极殿; traditional Chinese: 太極殿; pinyin: Tàijídiàn), also known as Taiji Hall, is one of the Six Western Palaces in the inner court of the Forbidden City. It is situated west of the Palace of Eternal Longevity, north of the Palace of Eternal Spring, and south of the Hall of Mental Cultivation.

== History ==
This residence was built in 1420 and was originally called the "Palace of Endlessness" (未央宫; Wèiyānggōng). As his father was born here, the Jiajing Emperor renamed it the "Palace of Endless Good Omens" (启祥宫; Qǐxiánggōng) in 1535. It received its current name in 1741, during the reign of the Qianlong Emperor.

In 1860, it was connected to the Palace of Eternal Spring by converting the back hall, Tiyuan Hall, into an opera stage where Empress Dowager Cixi could watch performances.

The Hall of the Supreme Principle has five rooms, two side halls, and a back hall. The main hall has a gabled roof covered with yellow glazed tiles like most palaces in Forbidden City. The beams are decorated with Suzhou style paintings, golden dragons, and phoenixes. The walls are intricately decorated with medallions of phoenixes sitting on the mountain, atypical for other palaces.

== Residents ==
=== Ming dynasty ===
Year	Emperor	Imperial consort	Notes
1476–1522	Chenghua	Empress Xiaohui	
1590	Wanli		It became his temporal residence after the three main palaces of the inner court burnt down
1640–1642	Chongzhen	Imperial Noble Consort Gongshu	She moved here from the Palace of Heavenly Grace and later returned to her original residence during illness

=== Qing dynasty ===
Year	Emperor	Imperial consort	Notes
1872–1924	Tongzhi	Imperial Noble Consort Xianzhe	
1908–1913	Guangxu	Empress Dowager Longyu	She moved here from the Palace of Accumulated Purity and also lived in the Palace of Eternal Spring

== See also ==
- Imperial Chinese harem system
- Forbidden City
- Weiyang Palace
