= Empress Borjigit =

Empress Borjigit could refer to several empresses in the early Qing dynasty. All of them were from the Mongol Borjigit clan:

- Empress Xiaoduanwen (1600–1649), first empress consort of Hong Taiji
- Empress Dowager Xiaozhuang or Empress Xiaozhuangwen (1613–1688), second empress consort of Hong Taiji
- Borjigit, Demoted Empress (fl. 17th century), first empress consort of the Shunzhi Emperor
- Empress Xiaohuizhang (1641–1718), second empress consort of the Shunzhi Emperor
