= Palace of Eternal Spring =

Residence of imperial consorts in the Forbidden City

Coordinates: 39°55′09″N 116°23′20″E

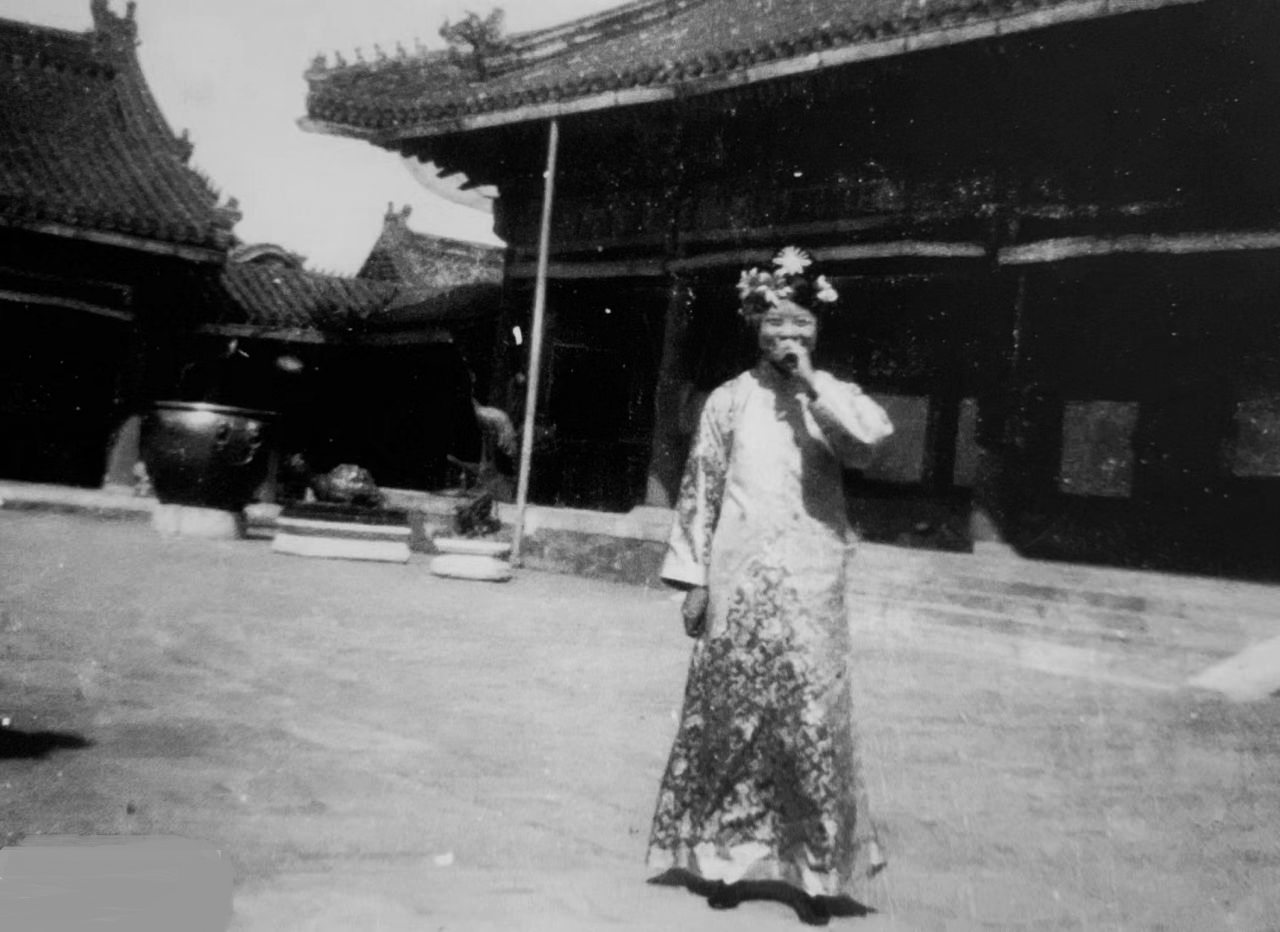
Consort Shu in the palace's courtyard

The Palace of Eternal Spring (simplified Chinese: 长春宫; traditional Chinese: 長春宮; pinyin: Chǎngchūngōng), also known as Changchun Palace, is one of the Six Western Palaces in the inner court of the Forbidden City. It is situated north of the Hall of the Supreme Principle, west of the Palace of Earthly Honour and northwest of the Palace of Eternal Longevity.

== History ==
This residence was built in 1420 and was named the "Palace of Eternal Spring". In 1535, the Jiajing Emperor renamed it to the "Palace of Eternal Tranquility" (永宁宫; Yǒngnínggōng). It regained its current name during the Qing dynasty and was renovated in 1689. In 1859, the inner gate was dismantled so as to connect it with the neighbouring Hall of the Supreme Principle; an opera stage where Empress Dowager Cixi could watch performances was constructed.

The most remarkable detail of the palace is a corridor painted with 18 Suzhou-style frescos depicting scenes from the Dream of the Red Chamber by Cao Xueqin.

== Residents ==
=== Ming dynasty ===
| Year | Emperor | Imperial consort | Notes |
|---|---|---|---|
| 1623–1627 | Tianqi | Consort Cheng | |

=== Qing dynasty ===
| Year | Emperor | Imperial consort | Notes |
|---|---|---|---|
| 1735–1748 | Qianlong | Empress Xiaoxianchun | |
| 1861–1884 | Xianfeng | Empress Dowager Cixi | |
| 1908–1913 | Guangxu | Empress Dowager Longyu | She moved here from the Palace of Accumulated Purity and also lived in the Hall of the Supreme Principle |
| 1922–1924 | Xuantong | Consort Shu | |

== See also ==
- Imperial Chinese harem system
- Forbidden City
