= Noble Consort Zheng =

Chinese imperial consort (1565–1630)

Noble Consort Zheng 鄭貴妃
- Born: 1565; Daxing County, Beijing
- Died: 1630 (aged 64–65); Forbidden City
- Burial: Seven Tombs of Imperial Concubines
- Consort of: Wanli Emperor
- Issue Detail: Zhu Changxu, Prince Ai of Bin; Zhu Changxun, Prince Zhong of Fu; Zhu Changzhi, Prince Hai of Yuan; Princess Yunhe; Princess Lingqiu; Princess Shouning
Posthumous name
- Imperial Noble Consort Gongke Huirong Hejing (恭恪惠榮和靖皇貴妃) → Grand Empress Dowager Xiaoning Wenmu Zhuanghui Ciyi Xiantian Yusheng (孝寧溫穆莊惠慈懿憲天裕聖太皇太后)
- Clan: Zheng
- Father: Zheng Chengxian (鄭承憲)

Noble Consort Zheng (1565–1630) was an imperial consort of the Ming dynasty. She is remembered for having been the most beloved consort of the Wanli Emperor and, in an attempt to please her, he tried to make her son his heir apparent. This act caused over a decade of conflict and factionalism in the imperial court.

== Early life ==
Lady Zheng was born in Daxing District of southern Beijing in 1565. In 1581, the imperial court opened selections for the emperor's harem and she was selected.

== Life in the palace ==
Soon after arrival in the imperial harem, Lady Zheng was elevated to the status of concubine (嬪 pín) with the honorific title "Shu" (淑; ''pure''). Her father was made a member of the Jinyi Guard, with authority over 1,000 households. In 1582, Lady Zheng was promoted to consort (妃) with the honorific title "Dé" (德; ''virtuous''), and her father was awarded a command.

In January 1584, the Wanli Emperor ordered the Ministry of Rites to confer the rank of noble consort (貴妃 guìfēi) upon Lady Zheng, to celebrate the birth of their eldest child, Princess Yunhe, who would pass away in 1590. The Wanli Emperor also gave his seneschal 100,000 silver taels to organise celebrations. In 1585, Lady Zheng gave birth to the emperor's second son, Zhu Changxu, who died soon after birth. In early 1586, she gave birth to her only surviving son, Zhu Changxun. In 1587, she gave birth to a third son, Zhu Changzhi, who died the following year. In 1588, she gave birth to a second daughter, Princess Lingqiu, who died one year later. In 1592, Lady Zheng gave birth to Princess Shouning, her last child and only daughter to survive to adulthood.

Lady Zheng died in 1630. She was entombed at Yinquan Mountain within the Ming Tombs, but in the area for concubines.

== Succession dispute ==
In 1586, the emperor decreed that Lady Zheng should be appointed as imperial noble consort (皇貴妃). His advisers argued that doing so was not appropriate, as this would raise her in status above Consort Gong, who had given birth to the emperor's eldest son. This was widely perceived as a precursor to the emperor declaring Lady Zheng's son, Zhu Changxun, heir apparent, skipping over his eldest son. Officials argued that, if Lady Zheng were to be made imperial noble consort, then the emperor should simultaneously raise Consort Gong to noble consort. The emperor, however, rejected his officials advice.

Over the succeeding decade, the officials also attempted to persuade the emperor that abandoning the tradition of primogeniture had made Lady Zheng the object of anger and disgust, not only in the court, but also across the country.

Finally, the emperor declared his eldest son, Zhu Changluo, heir apparent in 1601 and enfeoffed Zhu Changxun as Prince of Fu. However, he was not made to leave the imperial court in keeping with tradition until 1614, when his household moved to Luoyang. From 1613, the Wanli Emperor had persisted in making his disapproval of Zhu Changluo evident by preventing the burial of Crown Princess Guo in a manner befitting a crown princess — she was finally interred in 1615, after Lady Zheng's son left the palace. Zhu Changxun was killed by Li Zicheng in 1641.

== Titles ==
- During the reign of the Jiajing Emperor (r. 1521–1567):
  - Lady Zheng (鄭氏)
- During the reign of the Wanli Emperor (r. 1572–1620):
  - Concubine Shu (淑嬪; from 6 March 1582)
  - Consort De (德妃; from 26 July 1583)
  - Noble Consort (貴妃; from 7 August 1584)
- During the reign of the Chongzhen Emperor (r. 1627–1644):
  - Imperial Noble Consort Gongke Ruirong Hejing (恭恪惠榮和靖皇貴妃; from 1630)
- During the reign of the Hongguang Emperor (r. 1644–1645):
  - Grand Empress Dowager Xiaoning Wenmu Zhuanghui Ciyi Xiantian Yusheng (孝宁温穆庄惠慈懿宪天裕圣太皇太后; from 1644)

== Issue ==
- As consort:
  - Princess Yunhe (雲和公主; 1584–1590), personal name Xuanshu (軒姝), the Wanli Emperor's second daughter
- As noble consort:
  - Zhu Changxu (朱常溆), Prince Ai of Bin (邠哀王; 19 January 1585), the Wanli Emperor's second son
  - Zhu Changxun (朱常洵), Prince Zhong of Fu (福忠王; 22 February 1586 – 2 March 1641), the Wanli Emperor's third son
  - Zhu Changzhi (朱常治), Prince Hai of Yuan (沅懷王; 10 October 1587 – 5 September 1588), the Wanli Emperor's fourth son
  - Princess Lingqiu (靈丘公主; 1588–1589), personal name Xuanyao (軒姚), the Wanli Emperor's sixth daughter
  - Princess Shouning (壽寧公主; 1592–1634), personal name Xuanwei (軒媁), the Wanli Emperor's seventh daughter

== In popular culture ==
- Portrayed by Ma Yili in the 2005 Chinese television series Jing Yiwei
- Portrayed by Chen Hao in the 2007 Chinese television series Emperor My Second
- Portrayed by Seo Yoon-ah in the 2015 South Korean television series The Jingbirok: A Memoir of Imjin War
