= Zhu Changxun =

Chinese prince (1586–1641)

Zhu Changxun 朱常洵

Prince of Fu
- Tenure: 1601 – 2 March 1641 (Fief taken in 1614)
- Successor: Zhu Yousong
- Born: 22 February 1586; Forbidden City, Shuntian Prefecture
- Died: 2 March 1641 (aged 55); Luoyang
- Burial: Xiling (熙陵), Nanjing
- Issue: Hongguang Emperor; Zhu Youju, Prince Chong of Ying; Zhu Youhua, Prince Huai of De
Names
- Zhu Changxun (朱常洵)
Posthumous name
- Prince Zhong of Fu (Note: Bestowed by the Chongzhen Emperor.) (福忠王); Emperor Zhenchun Suzhe Shengjing Renyi Gong (Note: Initially conferred by the Hongguang Emperor.) (貞純肅哲聖敬仁毅恭皇帝); Emperor Zhenchun Suzhe Shengjing Renyi Xiao (Note: Changed by the Hongguang Emperor.) (貞純肅哲聖敬仁懿孝皇帝); Emperor Mutian Fudao Zhenchun Suzhe Xiuwen Xianwu Shengjing Renyi Xiao (Note: Changed by the Yongli Emperor.) (慕天敷道貞純肅哲修文顯武聖敬仁毅孝皇帝)
Temple name
- Gongzong (Note: Conferred by the Yongli Emperor.) (恭宗)
- House: Zhu
- Father: Wanli Emperor
- Mother: Noble Consort Zheng

Zhu Changxun, Prince of Fu (22 February 1586 – 2 March 1641) was the third son of the Wanli Emperor of the Ming dynasty. His mother, Noble Consort Zheng, was a favored concubine of the Wanli Emperor and, in an effort to please her, the emperor attempted to have Zhu Changxun installed as heir apparent, but failed to overturn the rule of primogeniture. After the fall of the Ming, however, Zhu Changxun's son, Zhu Yousong, became the Hongguang Emperor of the Southern Ming dynasty.

== Early life ==
Zhu Changxun was born in 1586 to the Wanli Emperor and Noble Consort Zheng. He was the emperor's third son and the third child of Lady Zheng.

Zhu Changxun was made Prince of Fu (福) in 1601. He was married in August 1604, for which his father levied taxes to fund the celebrations and wedding gifts. His first son, Zhu Yousong, was born to a concubine and enfeoffed as Prince of Dechang (德昌) in 1613. He moved his household to Luoyang in 1614, when he governed Henan as a fiefdom.

== Succession dispute ==
In 1586, the Wanli Emperor decreed that Lady Zheng should be given the title of Imperial Noble Consort. However, this met with much opposition since Lady Wang, the mother of the emperor's eldest son, only held the rank of Consort. The emperor's actions were perceived as the precursor to declaring Zhu Changxun heir apparent, instead of his elder brother, Zhu Changluo. The emperor's advisers argued that, if Lady Zheng were to be made Imperial Noble Consort, then the emperor should simultaneously elevate Lady Wang to Noble Consort. Over the next decade, advisers also attempted to persuade the emperor that abandoning the tradition of primogeniture had made Lady Zheng the object of anger and disgust, not only in the court, but also across the country.

Finally, the emperor declared his eldest son heir apparent in 1601 and gave Zhu Changxun the title Prince of Fu. However, Zhu Changxun was not made to leave the imperial court in keeping with tradition until 1614, when he moved his household to Luoyang.

== Death ==
Zhu Changxun was killed in 1641 during an uprising led by Li Zicheng. After his soldiers fell to Li's army, Zhu Changxun fled to Ying'en Temple (Chinese: 迎恩寺; pinyin: yíng'ēn sì) with his son Zhu Yousong. Whilst Zhu Changxun was captured, his son managed to escape. The next day, Zhu Changxun was executed in front of a large crowd, presided over by Li Zicheng, at Zhougong Temple (Chinese: 周公廟; pinyin: Zhōugōng miào). Unofficial reports claim that the prince was killed, then his body boiled with that of a deer to make stew, and his flesh was eaten by Li Zicheng and his soldiers. A memorial stone erected by the Hongguang Emperor states that his father's body was interred near Mt. Mang (邙), but was moved to Nanjing later on.

== Family ==
- Consorts
1. Lady Yao (姚氏) or Tian (田氏), the primary consort and mother of Zhu Yousong. Posthumously honoured as "Empress Dowager Xiaocheng Duanhui Cishun Zhenmu" (孝誠端惠慈順貞穆皇太后) by Zhu Yousong, Zhu Youlang changed the posthumous title to "Empress Xiaocheng Duanhui Cishun Zhenmu Futian Dusheng Gong" (孝誠端惠慈順貞穆符天篤聖恭皇后)
2. Lady Zou (鄒氏) the primary consort. Honoured as Empress Dowager with the title Empress Dowager Kezhen Renshou (恪貞仁壽皇太后) by Zhu Yousong
- Issues:
1. Zhu Yousong succeeded the title of Prince of Fu, later enthroned as the Hongguang Emperor of Southern Ming by Lady Yao
2. Zhu Youju (朱由榘) (26 July 1609 - 1618), Commandery Prince of Yingshang (潁上郡王). Later posthumously bestowed as "Prince Chong of Ying" (潁沖王) by Zhu Yousong
3. Zhu Youhua (朱由樺), Commandery Prince of Dechang (德昌郡王). Later posthumously bestowed as "Prince Huai of De" (德懷王) by Zhu Yousong

== Notes ==
Zhu Changxun House of Zhu; Prince of Fu's line (line of the Wanli Emperor's sons) Born: 1608 Died: 23 May 1646
Chinese royalty
New title	Prince of Fu; 1601–1641	Succeeded by Zhu Yousong
