= Consort Jing =

Consort Jing may refer to:

- Erdeni Bumba (fl. 17th century), wife of the Shunzhi Emperor
- Empress Xiaojingcheng (1812–1855), concubine of the Daoguang Emperor

== See also ==
- Empress Zhu (Eastern Wu) (died 265), posthumous name Empress Jing
