= Princess Shouning =

Ming dynasty princess (1592–1634)

Princess Shouning 壽寧公主
- Born: 1592; Beijing
- Died: 1634 (aged 41–42); Beijing
- Spouse: Ran Xingrang
- Issue: Ran Yinkong (冉印孔)
Names
- Zhu Xuanwei (朱軒媁)
- House: Zhu
- Father: Wanli Emperor
- Mother: Noble Consort Zheng

Princess Shouning (1592–1634) was a Ming dynasty princess, the seventh daughter of the Wanli Emperor and third daughter of Noble Consort Zheng. She was a particularly favoured child of her father, who ordered her to visit the palace once every five days after her marriage.

== Biography ==
Zhu Xuanwei was born in 1592. She was granted the title of Princess Shouning in 1609 and, in the same year, she married Ran Xingrang (冉興讓). She was given particularly generous gifts on her marriage, including 2,590 qing of land. After her marriage, the Wanli Emperor ordered that Princess Shouning visit him at the palace once every five days.

In her marital home, Princess Shouning's relationship with her husband was initially governed by a housekeeper named Liang Ying (梁盈). Liang once happened upon Princess Shouning drinking with her husband and threw him out of the room, then proceeded to scold the princess for her behaviour. Princess Shouning later tried to complain to her mother about Liang, but Liang had already visited Noble Consort Zheng and described the princess' inappropriate actions, thus Noble Consort Zheng refused to see her daughter. Ran also attempted to approach the emperor, but he was surrounded and beaten by palace eunuchs to the extent that his flesh was torn. Upon escaping from the eunuchs, Ran found that his horse and carriage had been taken away, so he was forced to limp through the city back to his mansion. The eunuchs were never punished and the only result was that Liang was transferred to work elsewhere.

The Ming Shilu records that Princess Shouning attended court to participate in ceremonies right up until 1620 alongside her siblings, Princess Rongchang, the Prince of Gui, and the Prince of Rui.
