= Hongguang Emperor =

Southern Ming emperor from 1644 to 1645

Hongguang Emperor 弘光帝

Emperor of the Southern Ming dynasty
- Reign: 19 June 1644 – 15 June 1645
- Predecessor: Chongzhen Emperor (Ming dynasty)
- Successor: Longwu Emperor
- Born: 5 September 1607; Beijing, Ming dynasty
- Died: 23 May 1646 (aged 38); Beijing, Qing dynasty
Era dates
- Hongguang: (Note: Chinese: 弘光; pinyin: Hóngguāng) 28 January 1645 – 17 August 1645
Regnal name
- Emperor Sheng'an (Note: Simplified Chinese: 圣安皇帝; traditional Chinese: 聖安皇帝 (conferred by the Longwu Emperor))
Posthumous name
- Emperor Nan (Note: Chinese: 赧皇帝 (initially conferred by Zhu Yihai)); Emperor An (Note: Chinese: 安皇帝 (changed by Zhu Yihai)); Emperor Fengtian Zundao Kuanhe Jingmu Xiuwen Buwu Wengong Renxiao Jian (Note: Simplified Chinese: 奉天遵道宽和静穆修文布武温恭仁孝简皇帝; traditional Chinese: 奉天遵道寬和靜穆修文布武溫恭仁孝簡皇帝 (conferred by the Yongli Emperor))
Temple name
- Zhizong (Note: Simplified Chinese: 质宗; traditional Chinese: 質宗; pinyin: Zhìzōng (conferred by Zhu Yihai)); Anzong (Note: Chinese: 安宗; pinyin: Ānzōng (conferred by the Yongli Emperor))
- House: Zhu
- Dynasty: Southern Ming
- Father: Zhu Changxun
- Mother: Lady Yao

Chinese name
- Chinese: 弘光帝
Transcriptions
Standard Mandarin
- Hanyu Pinyin: Hóngguāng Dì
- Wade–Giles: Hung^{2}-kuang^{1} Ti^{4}

The Hongguang Emperor (5 September 1607 – 23 May 1646), personal name Zhu Yousong, (Note: Chinese: 朱由崧; pinyin: Zhū Yóusōng) was the first emperor of the Southern Ming dynasty of China. He was the grandson of the Wanli Emperor through his third son Zhu Changxun, and a cousin of the Chongzhen Emperor, the last emperor of the Ming dynasty. He reigned briefly in southern China from 1644 to 1645.

In 1644, rebels led by Li Zicheng captured the Ming capital of Beijing, and the Chongzhen Emperor committed suicide. Two candidates for the throne then emerged in the auxiliary southern capital of Nanjing, but Zhu Yousong's supporters ensured his appointment as the Hongguang Emperor. In May 1645, Qing dynasty forces—who had defeated the rebels and established control over northern China—attacked Yangzhou, a city north of Nanjing. The battle was followed by the Qing forces crossing the Yangtze River and capturing Nanjing. The Hongguang Emperor fled to Wuhu, Anhui, but was captured in June and taken to Beijing, where he was executed in 1646.

== Early life ==
Zhu Yousong, the future Hongguang Emperor, was born on 5 September 1607. He was the eldest son of Zhu Changxun, Prince of Fu, and his wife, Lady Yao. Zhu Changxun was the favorite son of the Wanli Emperor, who ruled China's Ming dynasty from 1572 to 1620. His mother, Lady Zheng, was one of the Emperor's concubines. The Emperor and Lady Zheng wanted their son to become heir to the throne, but Zhu Changxun was not chosen due to pressure from officials who were part of the Donglin movement, a faction of scholar-officials that formed to oppose what they saw as moral and intellectual corruption during the late Ming. Instead, the Emperor appointed his eldest son Zhu Changluo, later the Taichang Emperor (r. 1620), as his successor. The Wanli Emperor provided for Zhu Changxun 120,000 hectares of land in the provinces of Henan, Shandong, and Hubei (then part of the Huguang Province), which had been confiscated from the local population. In 1614, Zhu Changxun went to his fief in Luoyang, Henan. He lived a life of luxury and splendor, and the administrators of his estates were known for their brutality towards their tenants. In 1617, the Wanli Emperor granted Zhu Yousong the title of Prince of Dechang. In 1640, peasant rebels led by Li Zicheng captured Luoyang. Li's rebels burned Zhu Changxun's palace for three days. They then proceeded to burn the prince and divide his roasted meat among themselves, with Li Zicheng even drinking the prince's blood. Zhu Yousong and his mother were able to escape, and in 1643, he was named the Prince of Fu in his father's place.

== Ascension ==
On 25 April 1644, Li Zicheng's forces captured the Ming capital of Beijing, and the Chongzhen Emperor (r. 1627–1644) committed suicide. Li then established the Shun dynasty but was in turn defeated by the Manchu-led Qing dynasty, which soon controlled northern China. The news of the Chongzhen Emperor's suicide was met with consternation when it reached the auxiliary southern capital of Nanjing in mid May and the officials in Nanjing began discussing the appointment of a new emperor. Two potential candidates emerged: Zhu Yousong, Prince of Fu, and Zhu Changfang, Prince of Lu. Despite doubts surrounding his candidacy, Zhu Yousong's right to succession was stronger than that of Zhu Changfang. Zhu Yousong was the closest living male relative of the deceased emperor and a direct descendant of the Wanli Emperor, while Zhu Changfang, a nephew of the Wanli Emperor, was supported by officials linked to the Donglin movement. However, officials described Zhu Yousong as being illiterate, avaricious, and cruel. His supporters, led by Ma Shiying, Viceroy of Fengyang, quickly arranged for him to travel to Nanjing from his residence in northern Jiangsu. Under Ma Shiying's military pressure, Shi Kefa, the effective head of government in Nanjing, accepted Zhu Yousong's candidacy. On 5 June, the assembled officials ceremoniously welcomed Zhu Yousong and on 7 June, following the precedent set by the appointment of the Jingtai Emperor (r. 1449–1457), he was declared "Administrator of the Realm" (監國) and moved to the Nanjing imperial palace. On 19 June 1644, he was proclaimed the first emperor of the Southern Ming dynasty, a continuation of the Ming dynasty. It was announced that the following year (1645) would be the first year of the Hongguang (弘光; 'great light') era.

== Reign ==
The first year of the Hongguang era was also its last. The Nanjing regime was weak in terms of military, financial, and organizational strength. Its influence was limited to a few provinces near the capital, and even there, collecting taxes was often challenging due to banditry. The government was further weakened by internal conflicts between the Shi Kefa and Ma Shiying factions, and in some areas, the army had descended to the level of common bandits. Many officials still believed that the main threat to the state came from rebel groups like Li Zicheng's, rather than the Qing. In fact, some even welcomed the Qing army's suppression of rebellions in the north.

A map of the Qing conquest of the Southern Ming (1645–1683), with the yellow arrows showing the campaign that led to the collapse of the Hongguang Emperor's Nanjing regime.

In the early spring of 1645, an impostor named Wang Zhiming (Chinese: 王之明) appeared in Nanjing, claiming to be the son of the Chongzhen Emperor. Ma Shiying imprisoned him, but rumors began to spread that he was the real heir, and the populace of Nanjing was inclined to declare the Hongguang Emperor illegitimate. Soon after, a woman surnamed Tong, who alleged she was the Hongguang Emperor's concubine, was jailed. Rumors of the Emperor's sexual debauchery, his mistreatment of Lady Tong, and her death in prison further damaged the regime's reputation. These rumors, along with fears that Li Zicheng would flee into Huguang, prompted the Ming general Zuo Liangyu to march east towards Nanjing on 19 April with the stated goal of "cleansing the surroundings of the ruler". Even as Qing forces under Manchu prince Dodo were entering Jiangnan, Ma Shiying considered Zuo Liangyu's invasion a greater threat, as he believed the Qing could be appeased. Ma ordered several Ming commanders north of the Yangtze River to halt Zuo's advance, thereby weakening Shi Kefa's defensive position in Yangzhou, a city north of Nanjing.

In May 1645, the Qing army captured Yangzhou, executing Shi Kefa and massacring the city's population. Following this victory, they crossed the Yangtze River. Upon hearing this news, the Hongguang Emperor fled Nanjing on 3 June. He sought temporary refuge with the troops of Ming general Huang Degong (黄得功) in Wuhu, Anhui Province. However, on 15 June, when the Qing troops arrived, Huang's officers betrayed their commander, joined the enemy, and handed over the Emperor to them. Prince Dodo berated the Emperor's battle strategy, stating that the Southern Ming could have won if they had attacked the Qing forces before they crossed the Yellow River. This accusation left the Hongguang Emperor speechless, unable to mount a defense. On 18 June, the Qing troops brought the Hongguang Emperor back to Nanjing. After locals publicly humiliated him and he had a confrontation with the impostor Wang Zhiming, the Emperor was taken to Beijing. There, he, along with Wang and other Ming princes, was executed on 23 May 1646.

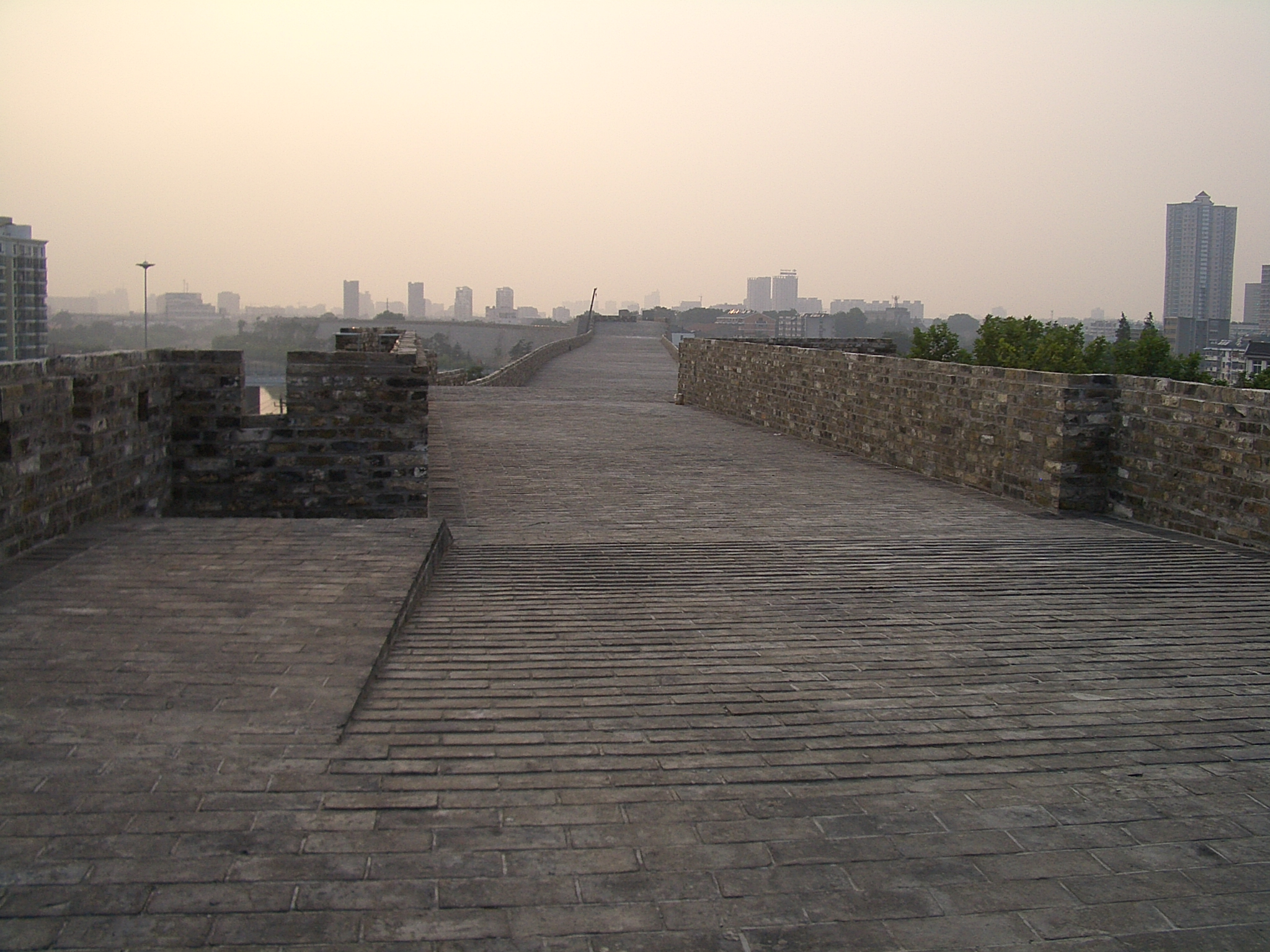
A section of the Nanjing city wall near Zhonghua Gate. When the Qing army advanced on Nanjing, the Emperor secretly fled, followed by Ma Shiying, and the city surrendered without resistance.

A few months after the Hongguang Emperor was captured, Zhu Yujian, Prince of Tang, a descendant of the Ming founder, the Hongwu Emperor, ascended the throne as the Longwu Emperor in Fuzhou, in the southeastern province of Fujian. The Longwu Emperor (r. 1645–1646) conferred on the Hongguang Emperor the regnal title of Emperor Sheng'an. Later, the last Southern Ming ruler, the Yongli Emperor (r. 1646–1662), conferred upon him the temple name of Anzong and the posthumous name Emperor Jian. Another Ming pretender, Zhu Yihai, conferred upon him the temple name of Zhizong and the posthumous name Emperor Nan, later changed to Emperor An, but these names were less commonly known than those granted by the Yongli Emperor.

== Assessment ==
Although the Hongguang Emperor's regime faced similar issues as the Ming government before 1644, such as inadequate government revenue compared to expenditure, Chinese historians and society have traditionally placed a significant portion of the blame for the fall of Ming rule in central China on him and his chief minister Ma Shiying. The Emperor is often portrayed as more interested in indulging in theater than governing, while Ma Shiying is depicted as a greedy leader. This portrayal of the two figures at the top of the power hierarchy aligns with traditional stereotypes in Chinese history, where the downfall of a dynasty is attributed to the personal flaws of its rulers. As a result, until the reign of the Qianlong Emperor (r. 1735–1796), Chinese historiography considered the Hongguang Emperor, rather than the Chongzhen Emperor, to be the last emperor of the Ming dynasty.

== Consorts ==
- Empress Xiaozhejian (孝哲簡皇后) of the Huang clan (黃氏)
- Empress Xiaoyi (孝義皇后) of the Li clan (李氏)
- Noble Consort (貴妃) of the Jin clan (金氏)
- Consort (妃) of the Tong clan (童氏)
- Consort (妃) of the Wang clan (汪氏) (Note: A courtesan from Huaiyang, she was captured by the Qing army.)
- Consort (妃) of the Chen clan (陳氏)
- Lady of Gentleness (淑女) of the Huang clan (黃氏)
- Lady of Gentleness (淑女) of the Guo clan (郭氏)
- Lady of Selected Service (選侍) of the Mou clan (某氏) (Note: After the fall of Nanjing, she became a nun and was given the Dharma name Zhenxiu.)
- Palace Lady (宮人) of the Zhang clan (張氏) (Note: After the fall of Nanjing, she drowned herself.)
- Palace Lady (宮人) of the Wang clan (王氏) (Note: After the fall of Nanjing, she became a nun.)
- Ye Zimei (葉子眉)
- Palace Lady (宮人) of the Xu clan (徐氏), personal name Shuxiu (淑秀) (Note: After the fall of Nanjing, she remarried a man surnamed Shao.)

== Notes ==
Hongguang Emperor House of Zhu Born: 5 September 1607 Died: 23 May 1646
Regnal titles
Preceded by Chongzhen Emperor (Ming dynasty)	Emperor of the Southern Ming dynasty 19 June 1644 – 15 June 1645	Succeeded by Longwu Emperor
Chinese royalty
New creation	Prince of Dechang; 1617–1643	Became Prince of Fu
Preceded by Zhu Changxun	Prince of Fu; 1643–1644	Merged into the Crown
