= Empress Wang (Southern Ming) =

Chinese empress consort (died 1662)

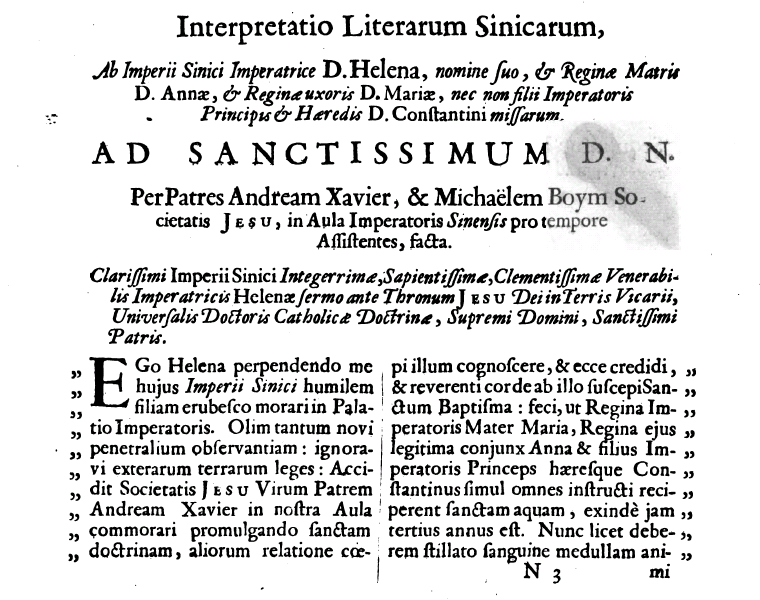
Letter from the Empress Dowager Helena Wang (the "honorary mother" of the Yongli Emperor) to the Pope with a request for help. November 1650. Latin translation by Michał Boym.

Empress Xiaogang Kuang (died 1662) was a Chinese empress consort of the Southern Ming dynasty, empress to the Yongli Emperor. She converted to Roman Catholicism and adopted the name Anne.

Chinese royalty
Preceded by Empress Xiaoyixiang	Empress consort of the Southern Ming dynasty 1646–1662	None; Southern Ming dynasty was ended in 1662
Preceded by Empress Xiaoyixiang	Empress consort of China; 1646–1662	Succeeded by Empress Xiaochengren (Qing dynasty)
