= Empress Zhou (Ming dynasty) =

Empress of China from 1628 to 1644

Empress Xiaojielie 孝節烈皇后

Empress consort of the Ming dynasty
- Tenure: 1628–1644
- Predecessor: Empress Xiaoaizhe
- Successor: Deposed Empress Jing (Qing dynasty); Empress Xiaoyixiang (Southern Ming dynasty)

Princess consort of Xin
- Tenure: 1626–1627
- Born: 10 May 1611; Suzhou
- Died: 24 April 1644 (aged 32); Palace of Earthly Tranquility, Forbidden City, Beijing
- Burial: Si Mausoleum
- Spouse: Chongzhen Emperor (m. 1626)
- Issue: Zhu Cilang, Crown Prince Xianmin; Princess Kunyi; Zhu Cixuan, Prince Yin of Huai; Zhu Cijiong, Prince Ai of Ding; Princess Changping; Princess Zhaoren
Posthumous name
- Empress Xiaojie Zhensu Yuangong Zhuangyi Fengtian Zhengsheng Lie (Note: Conferred by the Southern Ming dynasty.) (孝節貞肅淵恭莊毅奉天靖聖烈皇后); Empress Xiaojing Zhenlie Cihui Zhuangmin Chengtian Peisheng Duan (Note: Initially conferred by the Qing dynasty.) (孝敬貞烈慈惠莊敏承天配聖端皇后) → Empress Zhuangliemin (Note: Changed by the Qing dynasty.) (莊烈愍皇后)
- Clan: Zhou (周)
- Father: Zhou Kui, Marquis of Jiading (嘉定侯 周奎)
- Mother: Lady Ding (丁氏)

Empress Xiaojielie (10 May 1611 – 24 April 1644), of the Zhou clan, was a Chinese empress consort of the Ming dynasty, married to the Chongzhen Emperor. She is commonly referred to as Empress Zhou.

== Early life ==
Empress Zhou originated from Suzhou. She came from a poor background, which was customary in the Ming dynasty, who selected imperial spouses from the poor, who unlike upper class women did not have powerful families who could help any potentially politically ambitious empress.

== Empress ==
She was elevated to the position of empress after the succession of the Chongzhen Emperor to the throne. Empress Zhou is described as "stern and prudent"; never forgetting of her poor origin, she maintained a frugal policy in palace affairs, and was admired and praised for this.

The Chongzhen Emperor reportedly had a good relationship to her and divided his affections and attention equally between empress Zhou and his favorite concubine, Consort Tian (d. 1642), who was the mother of his 4th, 5th, 6th and 7th sons. Zhou was allegedly not jealous of Consort Tian, but she did disapprove of her haughty behavior. This eventually caused a conflict between the Empress and Consort Tian, which also involved the emperor.

At one occasion, when Consort Tian was to give her customary greeting to the empress before visiting the emperor, the empress snubbed her, reportedly to remind her not to be arrogant. Offended by this, Consort Tian complained to the emperor. The Chongzhen Emperor became infuriated with the empress, and reportedly abused her in a fit of rage. Empress Zhou reacted by refusing to eat. Her hunger strike caused the emperor to regret the incident, and the imperial couple reconciled. In 1642, Consort Tian begged the emperor to show leniency toward her father, Tian Hongyu, who was accused of lawlessness. This angered the emperor, who banished Consort Tian to a separate palace. On this occasion, Empress Zhou intervened with the emperor and asked him to end the exile of Consort Tian, which he did, after three months.

== Death ==
In April 1644, the army of the rebel Li Zicheng were approaching the capital through Juyong Pass. On 23 April, the Chongzhen Emperor held his last audience with his ministers. Li Zicheng offered Chongzhen the opportunity to surrender, but the emperor refused. The following day, the rebel army attacked the capital. The Chongzhen Emperor ordered the crown prince and his two brothers to hide in the home of relatives, and summoned the rest of his family. Rather than let them be captured by the rebels, the emperor started killing the female members of his family, concubines and consorts. Using his sword, he killed Consort Yuan and Princess Kunyi, and severed the arm of Princess Changping. Empress Zhou herself was ordered by the emperor to commit suicide, which she performed by hanging in Kunning Gong (Palace of Earthly Tranquility), Forbidden City.

== Titles ==
- During the reign of the Wanli Emperor (r. 1572–1620):
  - Lady Zhou (周氏; from 10 May 1611)
- During the reign of the Tianqi Emperor (r.1620–1627):
  - Princess consort of Xin (信王妃; from 1626)
- During the reign of the Chongzhen Emperor (r. 1627–1644):
  - Empress (皇后; from 2 October 1627)
- During the reign of the Longwu Emperor (r. 1645–1646):
  - Empress Xiaojie Zhensu Yuangong Zhuangyi Fengtian Zhengsheng Lie (孝節貞肅淵恭莊毅奉天靖聖烈皇后/孝节贞肃渊恭庄毅奉天靖圣烈皇后; from 1645)
- During the reign of the Shunzhi Emperor (r. 1643–1661):
  - Empress Xiaojing Zhenlie Cihui Zhuangmin Chengtian Peisheng Duan (孝敬貞烈慈惠莊敏承天配聖端皇后; from 1644)
  - Empress Zhuangliemin (莊烈愍皇后; from 1659)

== Issue ==
- As empress:
  - Zhu Cilang, Crown Prince Xianmin (獻愍太子 朱慈烺; 26 February 1629 – 1644), the Chongzhen Emperor's first son
  - Zhu Cixuan, Prince Yin of Huai (懷隱王 朱慈烜; died 15 January 1630), the Chongzhen Emperor's second son
  - Princess Kunyi (坤儀公主; b. 1630), the Chongzhen Emperor's first daughter
  - Princess Changping (長平公主; 1630–1646), personal name Meichuo (媺娖), the Chongzhen Emperor's second daughter
  - Zhu Cijiong, Prince Ai of Ding (定哀王 朱慈炯; b. 1632), the Chongzhen Emperor's third son
  - Princess Zhaoren (昭仁公主; 1639 – 24 April 1644), the Chongzhen Emperor's third daughter

== Notes ==
Chinese royalty
Preceded by Empress Xiaoaizhe	Empress consort of the Ming dynasty 1628–1644	Succeeded by Empress Xiaoyixiang (Southern Ming)
Preceded by Empress Xiaoaizhe	Empress consort of China; 1628–1644	Succeeded by Borjigit, Demoted Empress (Qing dynasty)
