= Prince of Lu (Ming dynasty) =

The Prince of Lu (Chinese: 魯王) was a Ming dynasty princely peerage created in 1370 for Zhu Tan, the Hongwu Emperor's tenth son by Consort Ning. The fief was located in Yanzhou Prefecture (兗州府) since 1385.

== Generation poem ==
The generation poem given by the Hongwu Emperor was:

肇泰阳当健 (Zhao Tai Yang Dang Jian)

观颐寿以弘 (Guan Yi Shou Yi Hong)

振举希兼达 (Zhen Ju Xi Jian Da)

康庄遇本宁 (Kang Zhuang Yu Ben Ning)

The peerage was used until "Hong" generation which was the same generation as that of the Tianqi Emperor.

Generation	Kangxi radical	Wu Xing element
Zhao (肇)	Radical 86 (火)	"fire" (火)
Tai (泰)	Radical 32 (土)	"Earth" (土)
Yang (阳)	Radical 167 (金)	"Metal" (金)
Dang (当)	Radical 85 (水)	"Water" (水)
Jian (健)	Radical 75 (木)	"Tree" (木)
Guan (观)	Radical 86 (火)	"fire" (火)
Yi (颐)	Radical 32 (土), Radical 41 (寸)	"Earth" (土)
Shou (寿)	Radical 167 (金), Radical 112 (石)	"Metal" (金)
Yi (以)	Radical 85 (水)	"Water" (水)
Hong (弘)	Radical 75 (木), Radical 61 (心)	"Tree" (木)
Zhen (振)	Radical 86 (火)	"fire" (火)
Ju (举)	Radical 32 (土)	"Earth" (土)
Xi (希)	Radical 167 (金)	"Metal" (金)
Jian (兼)	Radical 85 (水)	"Water" (水)
Da (达)	Radical 75 (木),	"Tree" (木)
Kang (康)	Radical 86 (火)	"fire" (火)
Zhuang (庄)	Radical 32 (土)	"Earth" (土)
Yu (遇)	Radical 167 (金)	"Metal" (金)
Ben (本)	Radical 85 (水)	"Water" (水)
Ning (宁)	Radical 75 (木),	"Tree" (木)

== Princedom of Lu ==
- Zhu Tan (朱檀; 15 March 1370 – 2 January 1390) (1st), Zhu Yuanzhang's tenth son who held the princedom from 1370 to 1390 and was posthumously honoured as Prince Huang of Lu (鲁慌王)
  - Zhu Zhaohun (朱肇𪸩; 15 July 1388 – 25 August 1466) (2nd), Zhu Tan's first son who held the princedom from 1403 to 1466 and was posthumously honoured as Prince Jing of Lu (鲁靖王)
    - Zhu Taikan (朱泰堪; 29 January 1412 – 14 November 1473) (3rd), Zhu Zhaohun's second son who held the princedom from 1467 to 1473 and was posthumously honoured as Prince Hui of Lu (鲁惠王)
      - Zhu Yangzhu (朱阳铸; 10 March 1448 – 11 December 1523) (4th), Zhu Taikan's first son who held the princedom from 1476 to 1523 and was posthumously honoured as Prince Zhuang of Lu (鲁庄王)
        - Zhu Dangcong (朱当漎; 22 September 1473 – 29 October 1505), Zhu Yangzhu's sixth son who held the title of heir apparent from 1483 to 1505 and was posthumously honoured as Hereditary Prince Huaijian of Lu (鲁国怀简世子). Later, his posthumous name was changed to Prince Huai of Lu (鲁怀王)
          - Zhu Jianyi (朱健杙; 4 November 1494 – 10 October 1520), Zhu Dangcong's second son who held the title of hereditary grandson from 1503 to 1520 and was posthumously honoured as Prince Dao of Lu (鲁悼王)
            - Zhu Guandian (朱观𤊟; 1520–1549) (5th), Zhu Jianyi's first son who held the princedom from 1528 to 1549 and was posthumously honoured as Prince Duan of Lu (鲁端王)
              - Zhu Yitan (朱颐坦; d. 1594) (6th), Zhu Guandian's first son who held the princedom from 1551 to 1594 and was posthumously honoured as Prince Gong of Lu (鲁恭王)
                - Zhu Shouzheng (朱寿铮; d. 1600) (7th), Zhu Yitan's sixth son who held the princedom from 1597 to 1600 and was posthumously honoured as Prince Jing of Lu (鲁敬王)
                - Zhu Shouhong (朱寿鋐; d.1636) (8th), Zhu Yitan's seventh son who held the princedom from 1601 to 1636 and was posthumously honoured as Prince Xian of Lu (鲁宪王)
                - Zhu Shouyong (朱寿镛; d. 1639) (9th), Zhu Yitan's eighth son who held the princedom from 1636 to 1639 and was posthumously honoured as Prince Su of Lu (鲁肃王)
                  - Zhu Yipai (朱以派; d. 1642) (10th), Zhu Shouyong's third son who held the princedom from 1640 to 1642 and was posthumously honoured as Prince An of Lu (鲁安王/鲁孝王)
                  - Zhu Yihai (朱以海; 6 July 1618 – 23 December 1662) (11th), Zhu Shouyong's sixth son who held the princedom from 1644 to 1662 while acting as a regent (监国) from 1645 to 1653.
                    - Zhu Honghuan (朱弘桓, d. 1683) (12th), Zhu Yihai's eighth son who held the princedom from 1664 to 1683 (鲁王)

== Cadet lines ==
=== Prince of Anqiu ===
- Zhu Taizhu (朱泰坾; 1411–1472), Zhu Zhaohun's eldest son who held the princedom from 1427 to 1472 and was posthumously honoured as Prince Jinggong of Anqiu (安丘靖恭王)
  - Zhu Yangsui (朱阳鐆; 1431–1467), Zhu Taizhu's first son who held the title of chief son (长子) from 1451 to 1467 and was posthumously honoured as Prince Zhuangjian of Anqiu (安丘庄简王)
    - Zhu Dangsui (朱当澻; 1 November 1454 – 20 August 1505), Zhu Yangsui's first son who held the princedom from 1476 to 1505 and was posthumously honoured as Prince Rongshun of Anqiu (安丘荣顺王)
      - Zhu Jianpu (朱健朴; 1477 – 1523), Zhu Dangsui's first son who held the princedom from 1508 to 1523 and was posthumously honoured as Prince Duanhui of Anqiu (安丘端惠王)
        - Zhu Huanqian (朱欢熑; 1504–1535), Zhu Jianpu's first son who held the princedom from 1525 to 1535 and was posthumously honoured as Prince Rongke of Anqiu (安丘荣恪王)
          - Zhu Yiku (朱颐堀; d. 1599), Zhu Huanqian's first son who held the princedom from 1536 to 1599 and was posthumously honoured as Prince Wenxi of Anqiu (安丘温僖王)
            - Zhu Shouchang (朱寿鏛), Zhu Yiku's first son who was posthumously honoured as Prince Kangyi of Anqiu (安丘康懿王)
              - Zhu Yihao (朱以浩; d. 1616), Zhu Shouchang's first son who held the princedom from 1605 to 1616 and was not given posthumous name (安丘王)
                - Zhu Hongjia (朱弘槚), Zhu Yihao's first son who held the princedom since 1616 (安丘王)

=== Prince of Leling ===
- Zhu Taiyu (朱泰𡒊; 1414–1470), Zhu Zhaohun's third son who held the princedom from 1427 to 1470 and was posthumously honoured as Prince Gonghui of Leling (乐陵恭惠王)
  - Zhu Yangguan (朱阳錧; 1442–1514), Zhu Taiyu's second son who held the princedom from 1472 to 1514 and was posthumously honoured as Prince Xuanyi of Leling (乐陵宣懿王)
    - Zhu Dangnai (朱当渿; 1468–1520), Zhu Yangguan's third son who held the princedom in 1520 and was posthumously honoured as Prince Duanjian of Leling (乐陵端简王)
      - Zhu Jiangai (朱健概; 1485–1553), Zhu Dangnai's first son who held the princedom from 1536 to 1553 and was posthumously honoured as Prince Zhuangkang of Leling (乐陵庄康王)
        - Zhu Huanfan (朱欢燔; 1502–1572), Zhu Jiangai's first son who held the princedom from 1557 to 1572 and was posthumously honoured as Prince Gongxi of Leling (乐陵恭僖王)
          - Zhu Yichan (朱颐𡍌; d. 1591), Zhu Huanfan's second son who held the princedom from 1590 to 1591 and was posthumously honoured as Prince Yumu of Leling (乐陵裕穆王)
            - Zhu Shougao (朱寿镐; d. 1620), Zhu Yichan's first son who held the princedom from 1599 to 1620 and was posthumously honoured as Prince Wenke of Leling (乐陵温恪王)
              - Zhu Yifan (朱以泛; d.1642), Zhu Shougao's first son who held the princedom from 1621 to 1642 (乐陵王)
                - Zhu Hongsi (朱弘枱; d. 1649), Zhu Yifan's first son who held the princedom from 1642 to 1649 (乐陵王)

=== Prince of Juye ===
- Zhu Taideng (朱泰墱;25 June 1416 – 7 February 1467), Zhu Zhaohun's fourth son who held the princedom from 1427 to 1467 and was posthumously honoured as Prince Xishun of Juye (钜野僖顺王)
  - Zhu Yangying (朱阳蓥; 1435–1505), Zhu Taideng's first son who held the princedom from 1469 to 1505 and was posthumously honoured as Prince Gongding of Juye (钜野恭定王)
    - Zhu Danghan (朱当涵; 1460–1529), Zhu Yangying's first son who held the princedom from 1508 to 1529 and was posthumously honoured as Prince Zhuangxian of Juye (钜野庄宪王)
      - Zhu Jianqian (朱健杄; 1495–1555), Zhu Danghan's second son who held the princedom from 1531 to 1555 and was posthumously honoured as Prince Duansu of Juye (钜野端肃王)
        - Zhu Huanxun (朱欢燖; 1530–1572), Zhu Jianqian's second son who held the princedom from 1557 to 1572 and was posthumously honoured as Prince Huirong of Juye (钜野惠荣王). The peerage was abolished after his childless death
        - Zhu Huanguang (朱欢光; 28 June 1535 – 24 August 1607), Zhu Jianqian's third son who held the title of defender general and acted as principality manager (管理府事) from 1572 to 1607
          - Zhu Yiyu (朱颐堣), Zhu Huanguang's first son who held the title of bulwark general and acted as principality manager from 1607.
            - Zhu Shougou (朱寿钩; d. 1646), Zhu Yiyu's successor who held the princedom from 1645 to 1646.

=== Prince of Dong'e ===
- Zhu Taiye (朱泰壄; 1417–1495), Zhu Zhaohun's fifth son who held the princedom from 1437 to 1495 and was posthumously honoured as Prince Duanyi of Dong'e (东阿端懿王)
  - Zhu Yangtan (朱阳镡; 1440–1483), Zhu Taiye's first son who held the title of heir son from 1465 to 1483 and was posthumously honoured as Prince Daohe of Dong'e (东阿悼和王)
  - Zhu Yangbiao (朱阳镖; 1449–1511), Zhu Taiye's second son who held the princedom from 1498 to 1511 and was posthumously honoured as Prince Rongjing of Dong'e (东阿荣靖王)
    - Zhu Dangjiang (朱当滰; 1495–1564), Zhu Yangbiao's first son who held the princedom from 1514 to 1564 and was posthumously honoured as Prince Kanghui of Dong'e (东阿康惠王)
  - Zhu Yangjuan (朱阳鋑), Zhu Taiye's fourth son who held the title of defender general (镇国将军)
    - Zhu Dangbo (朱当渤), Zhu Yangjuan's first son who held the title of bulwark general (辅国将军)
      - Zhu Jiangeng (朱健梗; 24 July 1500 – 15 September 1569), Zhu Dangbo's first son who managed the princedom until 1569 and held the title of state general (奉国将军)

=== Prince of Zouping ===
- Zhu Taicheng (朱泰塍; 1419–1463), Zhu Zhaohun's sixth son who held the princedom from 1437 to 1463 and was posthumously honoured as Prince Zhuangjing of Zouping (邹平庄靖王)
  - Zhu Yangtang (朱阳鎕; 1447–1509), Zhu Taicheng's second son who held the princedom from 1467 to 1509 and was posthumously honoured as Prince Gongyi of Zouping (邹平恭懿王)
    - Zhu Dangyi (朱当潩;1469–1539), Zhu Yangtang's first son who held the princedom from 1514 to 1539 and was posthumously honoured as Prince Zhuangding of Zouping (邹平庄定王)
      - Zhu Jiandang (朱健档;1492–1533), Zhu Dangyi's second son who held the title of defender general from 1512 to 1533 and was posthumously honoured as Prince Rong'an of Zouping (邹平荣安王)
        - Zhu Huanlan (朱欢爁;1516–1563), Zhu Jiandang's first son who held the princedom from 1542 to 1563 and was posthumously honoured as Prince Gongjing of Zouping (邹平恭靖王)
          - Zhu Yizai (朱颐在; d. 22 February 1602), Zhu Huanlan's first son who held the princedom from 1568 to 1602 and was posthumously honoured as Prince Kangshun of Zouping (邹平康顺王)
            - Zhu Shouyin (朱寿碒; d. 1646), Zhu Yizai's first son who held the princedom from 1605 to 1646 and was not given any posthumous name (邹平王)

=== Prince of Ziyang ===
- Zhu Dangzi (朱当渍; 1467–1539), Zhu Yangzhu's first son who held the princedom from 1478 to 1539 and was posthumously honoured as Prince Rongzhuang of Ziyang (滋阳荣庄王)
  - Zhu Jiandi (朱健樀; 1486–1517), Zhu Dangzi's first son who held the title of defender general from 1496 to 1517 and was posthumously honoured as Prince Huaiyi of Ziyang (滋阳怀懿王)
    - Zhu Huanwei (朱欢炜; 1505–1564), Zhu Jiandi's first son who held the princedom from 1543 to 1564 and was posthumously honoured as Prince Gongyu of Ziyang (滋阳恭裕王)
      - Zhu Yini (朱颐堄; 1532-17 August 1555), Zhu Huanwei's first son who held the title of chief son from 1544 to 1555 and was not given posthumous name (滋阳长子)
        - Zhu Shoufu (朱寿鍑; d. 1611), Zhu Yini's first son who held the princedom from 1570 to 1611 and was posthumously honoured as Prince Zhaoshun of Ziyang (滋阳昭顺王)
          - Zhu Yizheng (朱以塣), Zhu Shoufu's first son who held the title of chief son
          - Zhu Yiying (朱以渶), Zhu Shoufu's second son who held the princedom since 1511 and was not given a posthumous name (滋阳王)
            - Zhu Hongmao (朱弘懋; d. 25 February 1650), Zhu Yiying's first son who held the princedom until 1650 when he was killed in Huizhou (滋阳王)

=== Prince of Yangxin ===
- Zhu Dangze (朱当㳻;1468–1525), Zhu Yangzhu's 4th son who held the princedom from 1478 to 1525 and was posthumously honoured as Prince Anxi of Yangxin (阳信安僖王)
  - Zhu Jiansi (朱健杫;1488–1544), Zhu Dangze's first son who held the princedom from 1528 to 1544 and was posthumously honoured as Prince Anyi of Yangxin (阳信安懿王)
    - Zhu Huanran (朱欢燃; 1504–1548), Zhu Jiansi's first son who held the princedom in 1548 and was posthumously honoured as Prince Rongkang of Yangxin (阳信荣康王)
      - Zhu Yibu (朱颐埔; 1530–1558), Zhu Huanran's 2nd son who held the princedom from 1552 to 1558 and was posthumously honoured as Prince Gongjian of Yangxin (阳信恭简王)
        - Zhu Shouchao (朱寿钞; d. 1601), Zhu Yibu's first son who held the princedom from 1569 to 1601 and was posthumously honoured as Prince Duanshun of Yangxin (阳信端顺王)
          - Zhu Yishu (朱以澍; 31 January 1580 – 15 June 1635), Zhu Shouchao's first son who held the princedom from 1606 to 1635 and was posthumously honoured as Prince Zhaoding of Yangxin (阳信昭定王)
            - Zhu Hongbi (朱弘楅;d.1650), Zhu Yishu's first son who held the princedom from 1638 to 1650 and was not given posthumous name (阳信王)

=== Prince of Gaomi ===
- Zhu Dangmei (朱当湄; 25 May 1474 – 1 December 1509), Zhu Yangzhu's 7th son who held the princedom from 1483 to 1509 and was posthumously honoured as Prince Kangmu of Gaomi (高密康穆王)
  - Zhu Jianshi (朱健栻; 1492–1536), Zhu Dangmei's 1st son who held the princedom from 1512 to 1536 and was posthumously honoured as Prince Anjian of Gaomi (高密安简王)
    - Zhu Huanying (朱欢煐; 1 March 1515 – 19 June 1540), Zhu Jianshi's 1st son who held the princedom from 1539 to 1540 and was posthumously honoured as Prince Zhaohe of Gaomi (高密昭和王)
      - Zhu Yifeng (朱颐封; 2 July 1536 – 13 August 1553), Zhu Huanying's first son who held the princedom from 1547 to 1553 and was not given any posthumous name (高密王). After his childless death, the peerage was abolished.
    - Zhu Huanyi (朱欢熤), Zhu Jianshi's 2nd son who managed the principality since 1553 while holding a title of defender general (镇国将军)
      - Zhu YiX
        - Zhu ShouX
          - Zhu YiX (朱以X)
            - Zhu Hongyi (朱弘椅), Zhu Yifeng's successor who held the princedom from 1645 to 1646 and was not given posthumous name (高密王)

=== Prince of Dong'ou ===
- Zhu Dangbi (朱当沘; 10 February 1476 – 14 December 1543), Zhu Yangzhu's 8th son who held the princedom from 1487 to 1543 and was posthumously honoured as Prince Duansu of Dong'ou (东欧端肃王)
  - Zhu Jianqiu (朱健楸; 1496–1565), Zhu Dangbi's first son who held the princedom from 1546 to 1565 and was posthumously honoured as Prince Gongke of Dong'ou (东欧恭恪王). After his death, the peerage was abolished.
  - Zhu Jiantiao (朱健樤), held a title of defender general (镇国将军)
    - Zhu Huanchen (朱欢𤌁), held a title of bulwark general (辅国将军)
      - Zhu Yijiang (朱颐壃; d. after 1571), Zhu Huanchen's son who managed the princedom from 1571

=== Prince of Guishan ===
- Zhu Danghu (朱当沍; 1477–1514), Zhu Yangzhu's 10th son who held the princedom from 1488 to 1514 when he was stripped of his title and imprisoned (归善王).
  - Zhu Jianli (朱健𣐬; 1508–1543), Zhu Danghu's first son who held the princedom from 1541 to 1543 and was posthumously honoured as Prince Kangsu of Guishan (归善康肃王)

== Expired peerages ==
=== Abolished ===
- Prince of Gaomi (高密王)
- Prince of Dong'ou (东瓯王)
- Prince of Xincai (新蔡王)
- Prince of Dong'e (东阿王)

=== Extinct ===
- Prince of Guishan (归善王)
- Prince of Tancheng (郯城王)
- Prince of Guantao (馆陶王)
- Prince of Yicheng (翼城王)
- Prince of Baoqing (宝庆王)
- Prince of Dongyuan (东原王)
- Prince of Fu'an (福安王)
- Prince of Ningde (宁德王)
- Prince of Changtai (长泰王)
- Prince of Yongfu (永福王)

=== Absorbed into the princedom ===
- Prince of Fuping (富平王)
- Prince of Changde (常德王)
- Prince of Taixing (泰兴王)
