= Consort Fang =

Imperial consort of the Qianlong Emperor

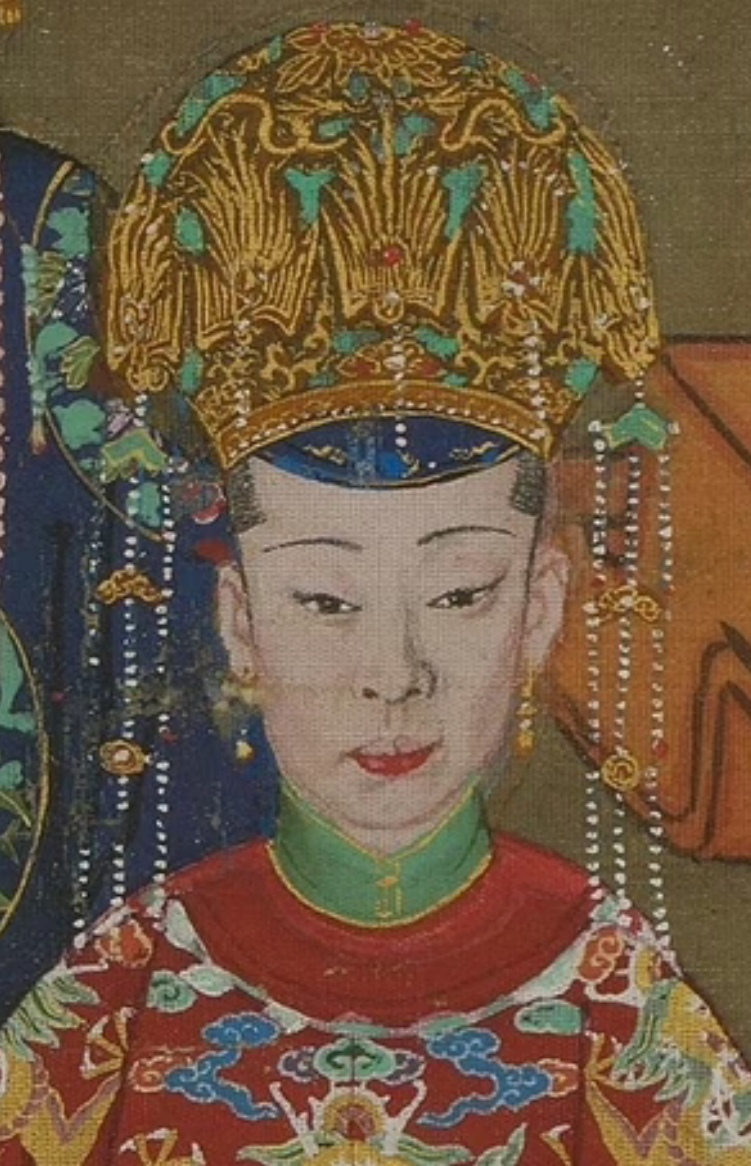
- Born: 24 September 1750; Yangzhou
- Died: 7 October 1801 (aged 51); Forbidden City, Beijing
- Burial: Yu Mausoleum, Eastern Qing tombs
- Spouse: Qianlong Emperor (m. 1766; died 1799)
- House: Chen (陳氏; by birth); Aisin-Gioro (by marriage)
- Father: Yanlun

Consort Fang
- Traditional Chinese: 芳妃
- Simplified Chinese: 芳妃
Transcriptions
Standard Mandarin
- Hanyu Pinyin: Fāng Fēi

Consort Fang (Chinese: 芳妃; pinyin: Fāng Fēi; 24 September 1750 – 7 October 1801), of the Han Chinese Chen clan, was a consort of the Qianlong Emperor. She and her brothers were inducted into a bondservant company of the Bordered Yellow Banner of the Han Chinese Eight Banners since it was required for all imperial consorts of the Qing dynasty to belong to one of the Eight Banners.

== Life ==
=== Family background ===
Consort Fang was a member of Han Chinese Chen clan. Her personal name wasn't recorded in history. Her ancestral home was located in Yangzhou.

- Father: Yanlun (延伦)
- Two elder brothers:
  - First elder brother: Chen Ji (陈济)
  - Second elder brother: Chen Hao (陈浩), a magistrate of Yangguan (扬关任事)

=== Qianlong era ===
Consort Fang was born on 24 September, 15th year of Qianlong's reign. She entered the palace in 1766 after a selection, and was given the rank of first class attendant (常在) with the honorary title "ming" (明; "ming" meaning "bright"). Her residence in the Forbidden City became Yongshou Palace. As a low-ranking imperial consort, she lived under the supervision of Concubine Shun and Consort Shu. In 1775, Lady Chen was promoted to noble lady (贵人). She was then accused by Empress Dowager Chongqing of harming an imperial child which resulted in her demotion to "First Class Female Attendant Ming". In 1780, she was restored as "Noble Lady Ming" (明贵人). In 1794, she was promoted to concubine (嫔) with the honorary title "Fang" (芳; "fang" meaning "fragrant"), and moved to Yonghe Palace on the east side of the Forbidden City.

=== Jiaqing era ===
In 1798, the Qianlong Emperor promoted Lady Chen to the rank of consort (妃). Consort Fang died on 7 October 1801 and was interred in the Yu Mausoleum of the Eastern Qing tombs.

== Titles ==
- During the reign of the Qianlong Emperor (r. 1735–1796):
  - Lady Chen (陳氏)
  - First Class Attendant Ming (明常在; from 1766), seventh rank imperial consort
  - Noble Lady Ming (明貴人; from 1775), sixth rank imperial consort
  - First Class Attendant Ming (明常在; from unknown date), seventh rank imperial consort
  - Noble Lady Ming (明貴人; from 1780), sixth rank imperial consort
  - Concubine Fang (芳嬪/芳嫔; from 1794), fifth rank imperial consort
- During the reign of the Jiaqing Emperor (r. 1796–1820):
  - Consort Fang (芳妃; from 1798), fourth rank imperial consort

== See also ==
- Imperial Chinese harem system#Qing
- Royal and noble ranks of the Qing dynasty
