= Empress Zeng =

Empress Xiaoyixiang 孝毅襄皇后

Empress consort of the Southern Ming dynasty
- Tenure: 1645–1646
- Predecessor: Empress Xiaojielie (Ming dynasty)
- Successor: Empress Xiaogangkuang (Southern Ming)
- Born: 1605
- Died: 17 September 1646 (aged 40–41)
- Spouse: Longwu Emperor
- Issue: Zhu Linyuan, Crown Prince Zhuangjing
Regnal name
- Empress Siwen (思文皇后)
Posthumous name
- Empress Xiaoyi Zhenlie Cisu Xianming Chengtian Changsheng Xiang (孝毅貞烈慈肅賢明承天昌聖襄皇后)
- Clan: Zeng (曾)
- Father: Zeng Wenyan, Earl of Jishui (吉水伯 曾文彥)
- Mother: Lady He (何氏)

Empress Xiaoyixiang (Chinese: 孝毅襄皇后; died 1646), of the Zeng clan, was a Chinese empress consort of the Southern Ming dynasty, empress to the Longwu Emperor.

== Notes ==
Chinese royalty
Preceded by Empress Xiaojielie (Ming dynasty)	Empress consort of the Southern Ming dynasty 1645–1646	Succeeded by Empress Xiaogangkuang
Preceded by Empress Xiaojielie (Ming dynasty)	Empress consort of China; 1645–1646	Succeeded by Empress Xiaogangkuang
