= Zhu Yihai =

Regent of the Southern Ming dynasty from 1645 to 1653

Zhu Yihai 朱以海

Regent of the Southern Ming dynasty
- Tenure: 7 September 1645 – March or April 1653

Prince of Lu (魯)
- Tenure: 1644–1662
- Predecessor: Zhu Yipai, Prince An
- Successor: Zhu Honghuan
- Born: 6 July 1618; Wanli 46, 15th day of the 5th month (萬曆四十六年五月十五日); Ziyang County, Yanzhou Prefecture, Shandong, Ming dynasty (present-day Yanzhou District, Jining, Shandong, China)
- Died: 23 December 1662 (aged 44); Yongli 16, 13th day of the 11th month (永曆十六年十一月十三日); Kinmen Islands, Simingzhou, Kingdom of Tungning (present-day Kinmen, Fukien, Taiwan)
- Burial: Prince of Lu's Tomb
- Issue: Hereditary Prince Zhu Hongxia; Hereditary Prince Zhu Hongzhan; Zhu Hongbing; Zhu Hongsen; Zhu Honggui; Zhu Hongdong; Zhu Hongju; Zhu Honghuan, Prince of Lu; First daughter; Princess of Lu; Third daughter
Names
- Zhu Yihai (朱以海)
Era name and dates
- Jianguo Lu (監國魯): 16 February 1646 – 29 March 1653
- House: Zhu
- Dynasty: Southern Ming
- Father: Zhu Shouyong, Prince Su of Lu
- Mother: Lady Wang

Zhu Yihai (Chinese: 朱以海; pinyin: Zhū Yǐhǎi; 1618–1662), courtesy name Juchuan (巨川), art name Hengshan (恆山) and Changshizi (常石子), was a regent of the Southern Ming dynasty from 1645 to 1653.

== Early life ==
Zhu Yihai was born in 1618, during the 46th year of the reign of the Wanli Emperor of the Ming dynasty. A son of Zhu Shouyong, he was a ninth-generation descendant (the same generation as the Taichang Emperor) of Zhu Tan, Prince Huang of Lu, tenth son of the Hongwu Emperor.

The mansion of the Prince of Lu was located at Yanzhou. The Qing forces had attacked Yanzhou and destroyed the mansion. At that time, the peerage of Prince of Lu was succeeded by Zhu Yihai's eldest brother, Zhu Yipai. After the Qing invaded, Zhu Yipai committed suicide along with two of his brothers, Zhu Yixing (朱以洐) and Zhu Yijiang (朱以江).

After his brother's suicide, Zhu Yihai was enfeoffed as the 11th Prince of Lu by the Chongzhen Emperor. After four days he succeeded his peerage, Li Zicheng attacked Beijing and he fled to southern China.

== Regency ==
The Prince of Lu was part of the resistance against the invading Qing dynasty forces. His primary consort, Lady Chen, committed suicide during the impending fall of the Ming. The location of her suicide can still be found on the island of Zhoushan.

In 1651 he fled to the island of Kinmen, which in 1663 was taken over by the invading force. His grave was discovered on the island in 1959 (The "Tomb Inscription of the Ming Dynasty Prince Lu" (皇明監國魯王壙志)), which disproved the theory advanced by the 18th-century History of Ming that he was killed by Koxinga. His eighth son, Zhu Honghuan (朱弘桓), married the fourth daughter of Koxinga and went to live in the Kingdom of Tungning Taiwan under the protection of Zheng Jing, his brother-in-law and worked as a farmer. Another Ming prince who accompanied Koxinga to Taiwan was Zhu Shugui, Prince of Ningjing.

After the surrender of the Kingdom of Tungning, the Qing sent the 17 Ming princes still living on Taiwan back to mainland China where they spent the rest of their lives. Including Zhu Honghuan.

== Sources ==
- The Pacification of Taiwan by the Great Qing (大清台湾绥记).
- Hummel, Arthur W. Sr., ed. (1943). "Chu I-hai" . Eminent Chinese of the Ch'ing Period. United States Government Printing Office.

Zhu Yihai House of Zhu; Prince of Lu's (魯) line (line of one of the Hongwu Emperor's sons) Born: 6 July 1618 Died: 23 December 1662
Chinese royalty
Preceded by Zhu Yipai, Prince An	Prince of Lu (魯); 1644–1662	Succeeded by Zhu Honghuan
