= Prince of Fu (Ming dynasty) =

Ming era peerage

- Creation date: 1601
- Created by: Wanli Emperor
- Peerage: 1st-rank princely peerage for imperial son of Ming Dynasty
- First holder: Zhu Changxun, Prince Zhong
- Last holder: Zhu Yousong (the 2nd prince)
- Status: Extinct
- Extinction date: 1644 (absorbed into the crown)
- Seat: Luoyang

Prince of Fu (Chinese: 福王), was a first-rank princely peerage used during the Ming dynasty, this peerage title was created by Wanli Emperor. The first Prince of Fu was Zhu Changxun, 3rd son of Wanli Emperor. This peerage had 2 cadet commandery princely peerages, all of these second-rank peerages had not inherited. The first Southern Ming emperor, Zhu Yousong (Hongguang Emperor) was the last title holder of this peerage.

== Generation name / poem ==
As members of this peerage was descentants of Yongle Emperor, their generation poem was:-

"Gao Zhan Qi Jian You, Hou Zai Yi Chang You. Ci He Yi Bo Zhong, Jian Jing Di Xian You"
高瞻祁見祐，厚載翊常由。慈和怡伯仲，簡靖迪先猷

This peerage used the poem until You (由) generation.

== Members ==
- Zhu Changxun (1st), Wanli Emperor's 3rd son. He granted and held the title of Prince of Fu in 1601. He took his fief in 1614. He was killed in 1641. Full posthumous name: Prince Zhong of Fu (福忠王)
  - 1st son: Zhu Yousong (2nd), initially held the title of a commandery prince under the title Comm. Prince of Dechang (德昌郡王). He succeeded and held the title of Prince of Fu from 1643 to 1644. He ascended the throne in 1644 as Southern Ming emperor in 1644.
  - 2nd son: Zhu Youju (朱由榘; born 26 Jul 1609), held the title of a commandery prince under the title Comm. Prince Yingshang (潁上郡王) from 1617 to 1643. He was posthumously bestowed under the posthumous title ""Prince Chong of Ying" (潁沖王).
  - 3rd son: Zhu Youhua (朱由樺), he held the title of his eldest brother, Comm. Prince of Dechang. He was posthumously bestowed under the title "Prince Huai of De" (德懷王).
