= Zuihuai =

Tree in Jingshan Park, Beijing

Coordinates: 39°55′23.22″N 116°23′33.64″E

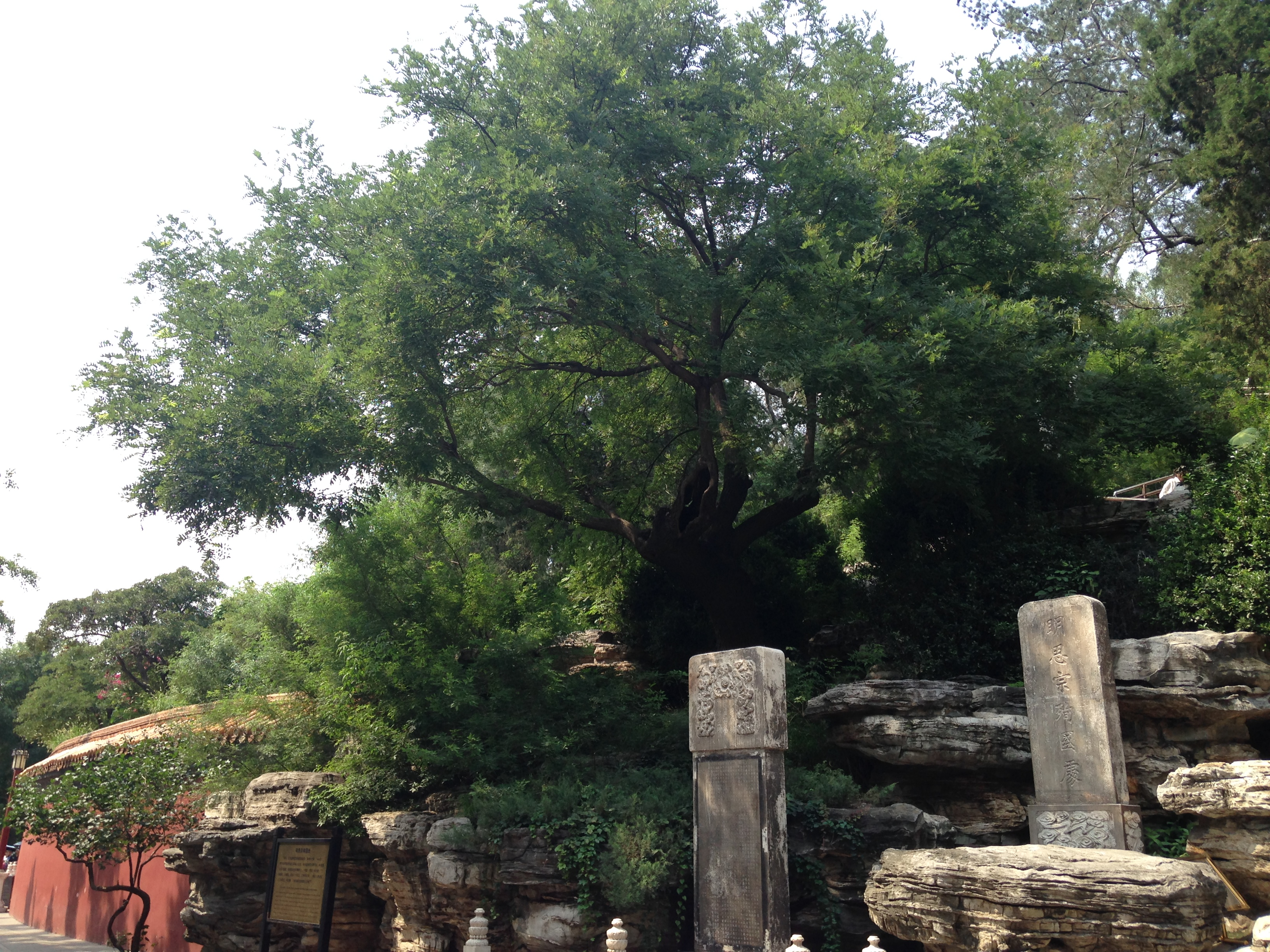
The zuihuai

The zuihuai (Chinese: 罪槐; pinyin: Zuìhuái; lit. 'guilty pagoda tree') is a specimen of the pagoda tree (Styphnolobium japonicum) located in Jingshan Park, Beijing, China. It is a tourist attraction and national landmark in Jingshan Park. The Chongzhen Emperor (Zhu Youjian), the last ruler of the Ming dynasty, allegedly hanged himself from the tree in 1644 after the imperial capital, Beijing, fell to rebel forces led by Li Zicheng. Eventually the Ming was destroyed, Li Zhicheng's forces were defeated, and the Qing dynasty was established in China.

The original tree has been replaced numerous times. The current tree is a 150-year-old replacement, replanted in 1996.

== See also ==
- History of Beijing
- List of individual trees
