= Tian Xiuying =

Consort of the Chongzhen Emperor (1611–1642)

Tian Xiuying 田秀英
- Born: 1611; Shaanxi, Ming dynasty
- Died: 16 October 1642 (aged 30–31); Palace of Heavenly Grace, Forbidden City, Beijing, Ming dynasty
- Burial: Si Mausoleum
- Spouse: Chongzhen Emperor (m. 1626–1642)
- Issue: Zhu Cizhao, Prince Dao of Yong; Zhu Cihuan, Prince Daoling; Zhu Cican, Prince Daohuai; Prince Daoliang
Posthumous name
- Imperial Noble Consort Gongshu Duanhui Jinghuai (恭淑端惠靜懷皇貴妃)
- Clan: Tian (田)
- Father: Tian Hongyu (田弘遇)
- Mother: Lady Wu (吳氏)

Imperial Noble Consort Gongshu (Chinese: 恭淑皇貴妃; 1611 – 16 October 1642), also known as Imperial Noble Consort Tian (田皇貴妃), Noble Consort Tian (田貴妃), or Consort Tian (田妃), personal name Tian Xiuying (田秀英), was a Chinese imperial consort married to the Chongzhen Emperor, the last emperor of the Ming dynasty. She was the favourite concubine of the emperor.

== Life ==
Tian Xiuying was native of Shaanxi Province, the daughter of Tian Hongyu and Lady Wu. Some other records noted that Consort Tian was not the biological daughter of Tian Hongyu. Her mother was previously a woman proficient in music and painting. Xiuying was adopted by Tian Hongyu after the marriage.

After a time, the Tian family moved from Shaanxi to Yangzhou Prefecture. When Chongzhen was still the prince of Xin, He married Lady Tian as his concubine. After he ascended to the throne, Lady Tian was named as his Noble Consort.

In the 5th year of Chongzhen, Noble Consort Tian gave birth to her first child, a son named Cizhao, who would disappear during the invasion of Beijing in 1644. He would later be posthumously named as Prince Daoyong (永悼王). One year later she gave birth to another son named Cihuan, entitled as Prince Daoling (悼靈王). Cihuan would die prematurely in 1637. In the same year, she had another son, Cican known as Prince Daohuai (悼懷王). The 6th prince would die on 5 May 1639 when he was 3. She had one more son, Prince Daoliang (悼良王). All of her sons died in childhood.

Although Noble Consort Tian was deeply favored by Emperor Chongzhen, her relationship with Empress Zhou was very tense, while Consort Shu, another concubine, got along very well with Empress Zhou.

In 1641 she was named as Imperial Noble Consort (皇貴妃; huáng guì fēi) and one year later in 1642 she died in Palace of Heavenly Grace (承乾宫). After her death, her sister, Tian Shuying (田淑英), was meant to enter the imperial harem.

After the fall of Beijing in 1644 to the armies of the rebel Li Zicheng of the Shun dynasty, the bodies of the Chongzhen Emperor and Empress Zhou were buried in the tomb of Noble Consort Tian, which was declared as Imperial Mausoleum Siling by Li Zicheng, with a much smaller scale compared to the other imperial mausoleums built for Ming emperors.

== Titles ==
- During the reign of the Wanli Emperor (r. 1572–1620):
  - Lady Tian (田氏; from 1611)
- During the reign of the Tianqi Emperor (r. 1620–1627):
  - Concubine (from 1626)
- During the reign of the Chongzhen Emperor (r. 1627–1644):
  - Noble Consort (貴妃; from 1627)
  - Imperial Noble Consort (皇貴妃; from 1641)
  - Imperial Noble Consort Gongshu Duanhui Jinghuai
    (恭淑端惠靜懷皇貴妃; after 16 October 1642)

== Issue ==
As a Noble Consort:

- Zhu Cizhao, Prince Dao of Yong (永悼王 朱慈炤; b. 1632), the emperor's 4th son
- Zhu Cihuan, Prince Daoling (悼靈王 朱慈煥; 1633–1637), the emperor's 5th son
- Zhu Cican, Prince Daohuai (悼懷王 朱慈燦; 1637 – 5 May 1639), the emperor's 6th son
- Prince Daoliang (悼良王), the emperor's 7th son
