= Erdeni Bumba =

Empress of China from 1651 to 1653

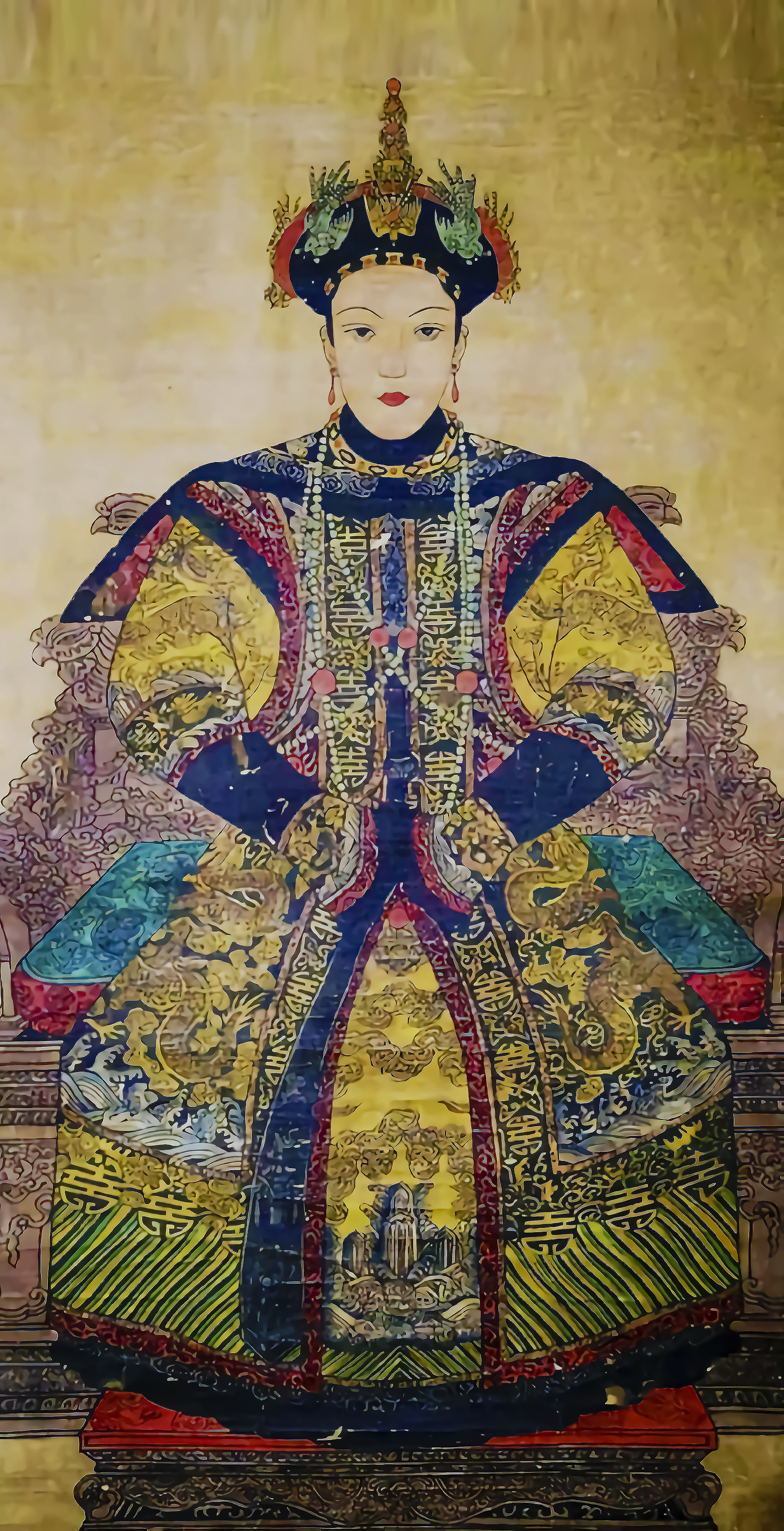

Empress consort of the Qing dynasty
- Tenure: 27 September 1651 – 25 October 1653
- Predecessor: Empress Xiaoduanwen
- Successor: Empress Xiaohuizhang
- Spouse: Shunzhi Emperor (m. 1651)
Names
- Borjigit Erdeni Bumba (博爾濟吉特·額爾德尼布木巴)
- House: Borjigit (博爾濟吉特; by birth); Aisin Gioro (by marriage)
- Father: Wukeshan (烏克善)

Chinese name
- Traditional Chinese: 靜妃
- Simplified Chinese: 静妃
Transcriptions
Standard Mandarin
- Hanyu Pinyin: Jìng Fēi

Erdeni Bumba (Mongolian: Эрдэнэбумба, Chinese: 額爾德尼布木巴; fl. 17th century), of the Khorchin Mongol Borjigit clan, was a consort of the Shunzhi Emperor of China's Qing dynasty. She was empress consort from 1651 until her deposition in 1653, when she was demoted to consort rank and received the honorific title Consort Jing.

== Life ==
=== Family background ===
- Father: Wukeshan (吳克善; d. 1666), held the title of a first rank prince (親王)
  - Paternal grandfather: Jaisang (寨桑), held the title of a first rank prince (親王)
  - Paternal grandmother: Boli
  - Paternal great aunt: Empress Xiaoduanwen (1599–1649)
  - Paternal aunt: Primary consort Minhui (1609–1641)
  - Paternal aunt: Empress Dowager Zhaosheng (Xiaozhuangwen) (1613–1688), the mother of the Shunzhi Emperor (1638–1661)

=== Shunzhi era ===
Erdeni Bumba was selected by her aunt - the emperor's mother, Empress Dowager Zhaosheng - to be the Shunzhi Emperor's primary consort. On 27 September 1651, she was instated as empress. The Prince-Regent Dorgon also encouraged the marriage between the Shunzhi Emperor and Erdeni Bumba.

Two years later, however, on 25 October 1653, the Emperor deposed her, despite protests from much of his court. She was demoted from empress to merely "Consort Jing". Some sources, such as the Draft History of the Qing, claim that she was deposed because of her love of luxury and tendency towards jealousy, characteristics decried by the emperor, who respected simplicity and frugality.

However, deposing her may have been related to growing estrangement between the emperor and his mother, and power struggles within the court. His mother and regent Dorgon, who were closely intertwined, held great power, and by deposing his mother's niece, who had been chosen for him, he may have been attempting to exercise his own power.

Some sources claim, that when she was living in Palace of Eternal Longevity, she became pregnant. During her pregnancy, she left the Forbidden City and gave birth to a son. However, historical records don't mention her further fate.

== Titles ==
- During the reign of Hong Taiji (r. 1626–1643):
  - Lady Borjigit
- During the reign of the Shunzhi Emperor (r. 1643–1661):
  - Empress (皇后; from 27 September 1651)
  - Consort Jing (靜妃; from 25 October 1653), fourth rank consort

== In fiction and popular culture ==
- Portrayed by Lee Ying-tong in The Rise and Fall of Qing Dynasty (1987)
- Portrayed by Wu Zitong in Xiaozhuang Mishi (2003)
- Portrayed by Winnie Ma in The Life and Times of a Sentinel (2011)
- Portrayed by Viola Mi 米露 in Royal Romantic (多情江山 (zh)) (2013)

== See also ==
- List of people who disappeared mysteriously (pre-1910)
- Ranks of imperial consorts in China § Qing
- Royal and noble ranks of the Qing dynasty

== Notes ==
Erdeni Bumba House of Borjigin (Боржигин) (1206–1653)
Chinese royalty
Preceded by Jerjer, Empress Xiaoduanwen of the Borjigit clan	Empress consort of the Qing dynasty 27 September 1651 – 25 October 1653	Succeeded by Alatan Qiqige, Empress Xiaohuizhang of the Borjigit clan
Preceded by Ming dynasty: Empress Xiaojielie	Empress consort of China; 27 September 1651 – 25 October 1653	Succeeded by Empress Xiaohuizhang
