= Palace of Eternal Longevity =

Residence of imperial consorts in the Forbidden City

Coordinates: 39°55′08″N 116°23′23″E

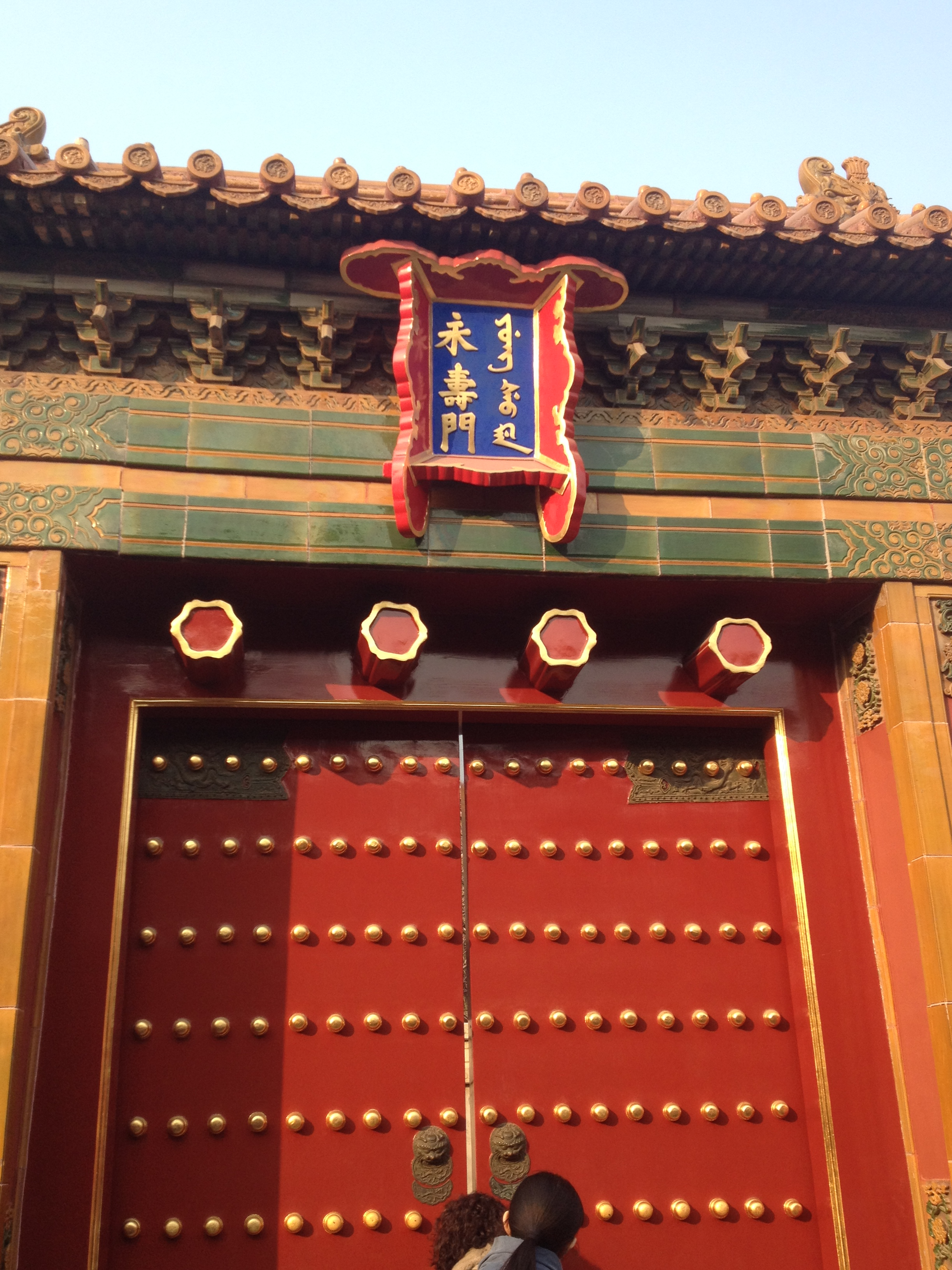
One of the palace's gates

The Palace of Eternal Longevity (simplified Chinese: 永寿宫; traditional Chinese: 永壽宮; pinyin: Yŏngshòugōng), also known as Yongshou Palace, is one of the Six Western Palaces in the inner court of the Forbidden City. It is the closest residence to the Hall of Mental Cultivation, the living quarters of the Qing emperors since 1722.

== History ==
It was built in 1420 as the "Palace of Eternal Pleasure" (长乐宫; Chǎnglègōng). In 1535, the Jiajing Emperor renamed it as the "Palace of Embodying Morality" (毓德宫; Yùdégōng). It received its current name in 1616, during the reign of the Wanli Emperor, and underwent renovations in 1697 and 1897. During the Qianlong era, the palace was used for the wedding banquets of Princess Heke of the Second Rank in 1772 and Princess Hexiao of the First Rank in 1789.

== Residents ==
=== Ming dynasty ===
Year	Emperor	Imperial consort	Note
1466–1475	Chenghua	Empress Xiaomu	
1638–1643	Chongzhen		He used it as a shelter from natural disasters

=== Qing dynasty ===
Year	Emperor	Imperial consort	Note
	Shunzhi	Consort Jing	She moved here from the Palace of Earthly Tranquility after being deposed as empress
1657–1667	Shunzhi	Consort Ke	She lived here before being promoted to the rank of consort
1675–1711	Kangxi	Consort Liang	
1682–1694	Kangxi	Noble Consort Wenxi	
	Kangxi	Imperial Noble Consort Jingmin	
	Yongzheng	Empress Xiaoshengxian	
	Qianlong	Imperial Noble Consort Huixian	
1742–1777	Qianlong	Consort Shu	She moved here after being promoted to the rank of concubine
1757–1784	Qianlong	Concubine Cheng	
1766–1788	Qianlong	Noble Lady Shun	
1766–1794	Qianlong	Consort Fang	
1796–1800	Qianlong	Noble Consort Ying	She moved here after the Qianlong Emperor's abdication
1801–1821	Jiaqing	Imperial Noble Consort Gongshun	

== See also ==
- Imperial Chinese harem system
- Forbidden City
