= Chongzhen Emperor =

Emperor of China from 1627 to 1644

Chongzhen Emperor 崇禎帝

Emperor of the Ming dynasty
- Reign: 2 October 1627 – 25 April 1644
- Enthronement: 2 October 1627
- Predecessor: Tianqi Emperor
- Successor: Hongguang Emperor (Southern Ming dynasty)

Emperor of China
- Reign: 1627–1644
- Predecessor: Tianqi Emperor
- Successor: Shunzhi Emperor (Qing dynasty)

Prince of Xin
- Tenure: 1622–1627
- Born: 6 February 1611; Shuntian Prefecture, North Zhili, Ming dynasty
- Died: 25 April 1644 (aged 33); Wansui Hill, Imperial City, Shuntian Prefecture, North Zhili, Ming dynasty
- Burial: Si Mausoleum, Ming tombs, Beijing
- Spouse: Empress Xiaojielie (m. 1626; died 1644)
- Issue Detail: Zhu Cilang, Crown Prince Xianmin; Princess Changping
Names
- Zhu Youjian (Note: simplified Chinese: 朱由检; traditional Chinese: 朱由檢; pinyin: Zhū Yóujiǎn)
Era dates
- Chongzhen: (Note: simplified Chinese: 崇祯; traditional Chinese: 崇禎; pinyin: Chóngzhēn) 5 February 1628 – 27 January 1645
Posthumous name
- Emperor Zhaotian Yidao Gangming Kejian Kuiwen Fenwu Dunren Maoxiao Lie (Note: simplified Chinese: 绍天绎道刚明恪俭揆文奋武敦仁懋孝烈皇帝; traditional Chinese: 紹天繹道剛明恪儉揆文奮武敦仁懋孝烈皇帝 (conferred by the Southern Ming dynasty)); Emperor Qintian Shoudao Minyi Dunjian Hongwen Xiangwu Tiren Zhixiao Duan (Note: simplified Chinese: 钦天守道敏毅敦俭弘文襄武体仁致孝端皇帝; traditional Chinese: 欽天守道敏毅敦儉弘文襄武體仁致孝端皇帝 (initially conferred by the Qing dynasty)); Emperor Zhuanglie Min (Note: simplified Chinese: 庄烈愍皇帝; traditional Chinese: 莊烈愍皇帝 (changed by the Qing dynasty))
Temple name
- Sizong (Note: Chinese: 思宗; pinyin: Sīzōng (initially conferred by the Hongguang Emperor)) (commonly known) → Yizong (Note: Chinese: 毅宗; pinyin: Yìzōng (changed by the Hongguang Emperor)) → Weizong (Note: Chinese: 威宗; pinyin: Wēizōng (conferred by the Longwu Emperor)); Huaizong (Note: simplified Chinese: 怀宗; traditional Chinese: 懷宗; pinyin: Huáizōng (conferred by the Qing court, but was later revoked))
- House: Zhu
- Dynasty: Ming
- Father: Taichang Emperor
- Mother: Empress Dowager Xiaochun
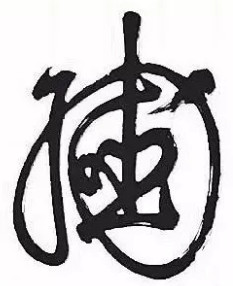
- Signature

Chinese name
- Traditional Chinese: 崇禎帝
- Simplified Chinese: 崇祯帝
Transcriptions
Standard Mandarin
- Hanyu Pinyin: Chóngzhēn Dì

The Chongzhen Emperor (6 February 1611 – 25 April 1644), temple name Ming Sizong, personal name Zhu Youjian, courtesy name Deyue, (Note: simplified Chinese: 德约; traditional Chinese: 德約; pinyin: Déyuē) was the 17th and last emperor of the Ming dynasty, reigning from 1627 to 1644. He succeeded his elder brother, the Tianqi Emperor. "Chongzhen", the era name of his reign, means "honorable and auspicious."

Zhu Youjian was son of the Taichang Emperor. As emperor, he battled peasant rebellions and was not able to defend the northern frontier against the Manchu. When rebels under Li Zicheng reached the capital Beijing in 1644, he committed suicide, ending the Ming dynasty. The Manchu formed the succeeding Qing dynasty.

In 1645, Zhu Yousong, who had proclaimed himself the Hongguang Emperor of the Southern Ming dynasty, gave the Chongzhen Emperor the temple name "Sizong". In historical texts, "Sizong" is the most common temple name of the Chongzhen Emperor, even though the Southern Ming rulers had changed "Sizong" to "Yizong" (毅宗) and then to "Weizong" (威宗). The Qing dynasty gave the Chongzhen Emperor the temple name "Huaizong" (懷宗), but the temple name was later revoked.

== Early life ==
Zhu Youjian was the fifth son of Zhu Changluo, the Taichang Emperor, and one of his low-ranking concubines, Lady Liu. When Zhu Youjian was four years old, his mother was executed by his father for reasons unknown and was buried secretly. Zhu Youjian was then adopted by his father's other concubines. He was first raised by Consort Kang, and after she adopted his eldest brother Zhu Youjiao, he was raised by Consort Zhuang.

All of the Taichang Emperor's sons died before reaching adulthood except for Zhu Youjiao and Zhu Youjian. Zhu Youjian grew up in a relatively lonely but quiet environment. After the Taichang Emperor died in 1620, Zhu Youjian's elder brother Zhu Youjiao succeeded their father and was enthroned as the Tianqi Emperor. He granted the title "Prince of Xin" (信王) to Zhu Youjian and posthumously honoured Zhu Youjian's mother, Lady Liu, as "Consort Xian" (賢妃). Fearing the court eunuch Wei Zhongxian, who controlled the Tianqi Emperor, Zhu Youjian avoided attending imperial court sessions under the pretext of illness until he was summoned to court by his brother in 1627. At the time, the Tianqi Emperor was gravely ill and wanted Zhu Youjian to rely on Wei Zhongxian in the future.

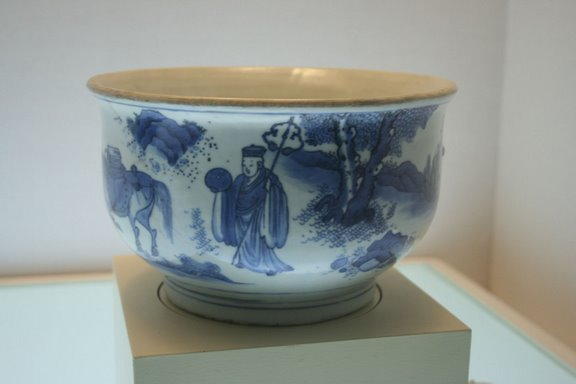
Ming dynasty porcelain bowl, Chongzhen reign period

== Reign ==
When the Tianqi Emperor died in October 1627, he had no surviving heir (his last son died a year prior during the mysterious Wanggongchang Explosion). As the emperor's brother, Zhu Youjian, then about 16 years old, ascended the throne as the Chongzhen Emperor. His succession was helped by Empress Zhang (widow of the Tianqi Emperor), despite the manoeuvres of the chief eunuch, Wei Zhongxian, who wanted to continue to dominate the imperial court. From the beginning of his rule, the Chongzhen Emperor did his best to stem the decline of the Ming dynasty. His efforts at reform focused on the top ranks of the civil and military establishment. However, years of internal corruption and an empty treasury made it almost impossible to find capable ministers to fill important government posts. The emperor also tended to be suspicious of his subordinates, executing dozens of field commanders, including general Yuan Chonghuan, who had directed the defence of the northern frontier against the Manchu (later known as the Qing dynasty). The Chongzhen Emperor's reign was marked by his fear of factionalism among his officials, which had been a serious issue during the reign of the Tianqi Emperor. After his brother's death, the Chongzhen Emperor immediately eliminated Wei Zhongxian and Madam Ke, as well as other officials thought to be involved in the "Wei-Ke conspiracy".

Meanwhile, partisans of the Donglin Academy faction, which had been devastated under Wei Zhongxian's influence, established political organizations throughout the Jiangnan region. Chief among these was the Fushe, or Restoration Society, whose members were a new generation of scholars who identified with the old Donglin faction. They succeeded in placing their members into high government posts through the imperial examinations of 1630 and 1631. The reversal of Wei Zhongxian's fortunes resulted in a renewal of the Donglin faction's influence at court, arousing great suspicion from the Chongzhen Emperor. The nomination of Donglin favorite Qian Qianyi for the post of Grand Secretary led to accusations of corruption and factionalism by his rival Wen Tiren. Qian Qianyi was imprisoned on the emperor's orders. Though he was soon released, his status was reduced to that of a commoner and he returned to Jiangnan. Wen Tiren would later become Grand Secretary himself.

=== Peasant rebellions and Manchu invasion ===
In the early 17th century, persistent drought and famine driven by the Little Ice Age accelerated the collapse of the Ming dynasty. Two major popular uprisings swelled up, led by Zhang Xianzhong and Li Zicheng, both poor men from famine-hit Shaanxi who took up arms in the 1620s. At the same time, Ming armies were occupied in the defence of the northern border against the Manchu ruler Hong Taiji, whose father, Nurhaci, had united the Manchu tribes into a cohesive force. In 1636, after years of campaigns against Ming fortifications north of the Great Wall, Hong Taiji declared himself emperor of the Qing dynasty.

Through the 1630s, rebellion spread from Shaanxi to nearby Huguang and Henan. From 1633 to 1644, the Great Plague of Jingshi devastated northern China. In 1641, Xiangyang fell to Zhang Xianzhong, and Luoyang to Li Zicheng. The next year, Li Zicheng captured Kaifeng. The year after that, Zhang Xianzhong took Wuchang and established himself the ruler of his Xi kingdom. Court officials offered a number of unrealistic proposals to stop the rebel armies, including the establishment of archery contests, the restoration of the weisuo military colony system, and the execution of disloyal peasants. Li Zicheng took Xi'an in late 1643, renaming it Chang'an, which had been the city's name when it was the capital of the Tang dynasty. On the lunar New Year of 1644, he proclaimed himself king of the Shun dynasty and prepared to capture Beijing.

By this point, the situation had become critical for the Chongzhen Emperor, who rejected proposals to recruit new militias from the Beijing region and to recall general Wu Sangui, the defender of Shanhai Pass on the Great Wall. The Chongzhen Emperor had dispatched a new field commander, Yu Yinggui, who failed to stop Li Zicheng's armies as they crossed the Yellow River in December 1643. Back in Beijing, the capital defence forces consisted of old and feeble men, who were starving because of the corruption of eunuchs responsible for provisioning their supplies. The troops had not been paid for nearly a year. Meanwhile, the capture of Taiyuan by Li Zicheng's forces gave his campaign additional momentum; garrisons began to surrender to him without a fight. Through February and March 1644, the Chongzhen Emperor declined repeated proposals to move the court south to Nanjing, and in early April, he rejected a suggestion to move the crown prince to the south.

=== Death ===
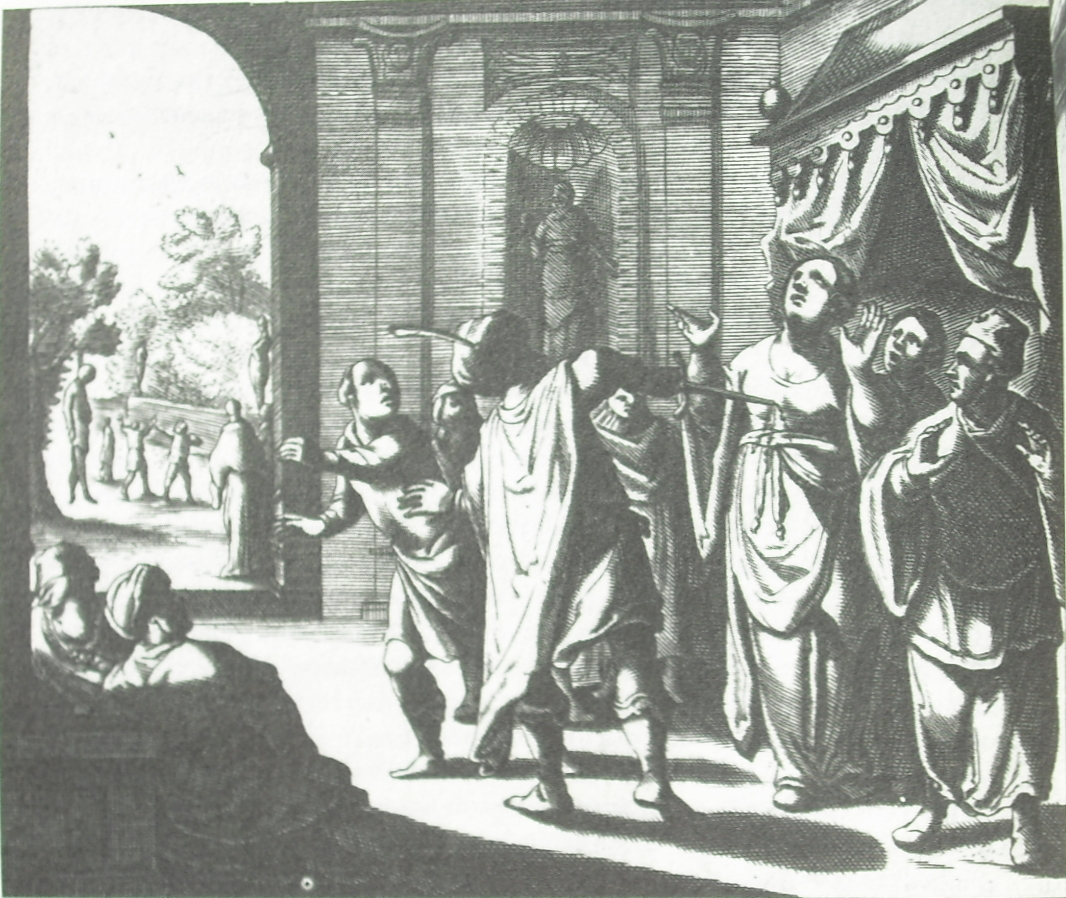
The Chongzhen Emperor Slays One of His Daughters, from Martino Martini's De Bello Tartarico Historia (1655)

In April 1644, the Ming imperial court finally ordered Wu Sangui to move his army south from his fortress at Ningyuan to Shanhai Pass. It was too late, however, and Wu would not reach Shanhai Pass until 26 April. Word reached Beijing that Shun rebels were approaching the capital through Juyong Pass, and the Chongzhen Emperor held his last audience with his ministers on 23 April. Li Zicheng offered the emperor an opportunity to surrender, but the negotiations produced no result. Li commanded his forces to attack on 24 April. Rather than face capture by the rebels, the Chongzhen Emperor gathered all members of the imperial household except his sons. Using his sword, he killed Consort Yuan and Princess Zhaoren, and severed the arm of Princess Changping.

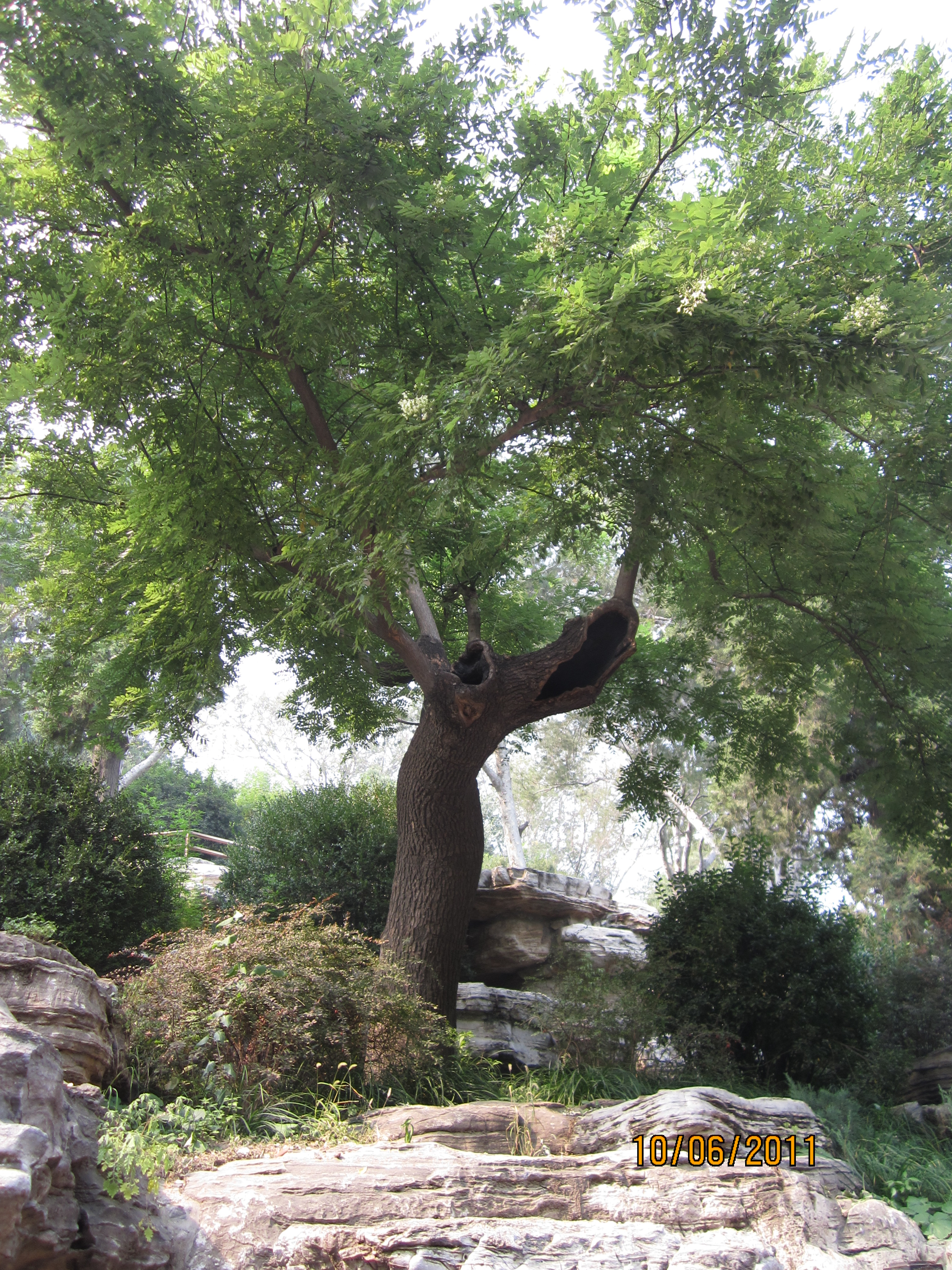
A modern replacement of the tree from which the Chongzhen Emperor was said to have hanged himself

On 25 April, the Chongzhen Emperor was said to have walked to Meishan, a small hill in present-day Jingshan Park. There, he either hanged himself on a tree, or strangled himself with a sash. By some accounts, the emperor left a suicide note that said, "I die unable to face my ancestors in the underworld, dejected and ashamed. May the rebels dismember my corpse and slaughter my officials, but let them not despoil the imperial tombs nor harm a single one of our people." According to a servant who discovered the emperor's body under a tree, however, the words tianzi (Son of Heaven) were the only written evidence left after his death. The emperor was buried in the Ming tombs.

The Qing rallied support from loyalist Ming forces and civilians by stating their goal was to "avenge the emperor". The Shun dynasty lasted less than a year with Li Zicheng's defeat at the Battle of Shanhai Pass. The victorious Qing established the Shunzhi Emperor of the Qing dynasty as ruler of all China. Because the Chongzhen Emperor had refused to move the court south to Nanjing, the new Qing government was able to take over a largely intact Beijing bureaucracy, aiding their efforts to displace the Ming.

After the Chongzhen Emperor's death, loyalist forces proclaimed a Southern Ming dynasty in Nanjing, naming Zhu Yousong (the Prince of Fu) as the Hongguang Emperor. In 1645, however, Qing armies started to move against the Ming remnants. The Southern Ming, again bogged down by factional infighting, were unable to hold back the Qing onslaught, and Nanjing surrendered on 8 June 1645. Zhu Yousong was captured on 15 June and brought to Beijing, where he died the following year. The dwindling Southern Ming were continually pushed farther south, and the last emperor of the Southern Ming, Zhu Youlang, was finally caught in Burma, transported to Yunnan, and executed in 1662 by Wu Sangui.

== Legacy ==
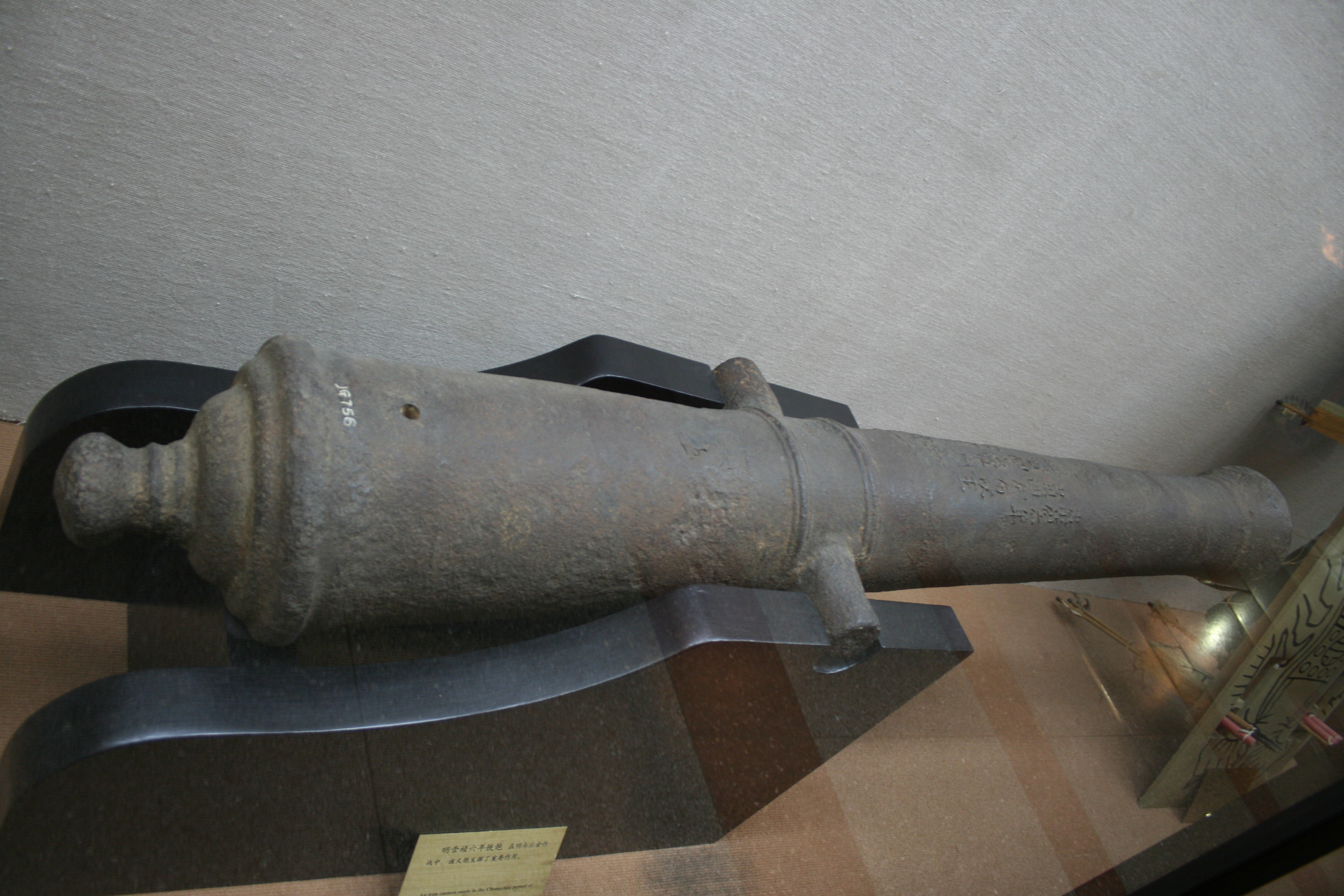
Cannon forged during Chongzhen's reign, 1633

While the Chongzhen Emperor was not especially incompetent by the standards of the later Ming, he nevertheless sealed the fate of the Ming dynasty. In many ways, he did his best to save the dynasty. However, despite a reputation for hard work, the emperor's paranoia, impatience, stubbornness and lack of regard for the plight of his people doomed his crumbling empire. His attempts at reform did not take into account the considerable decline of Ming power, which was already far advanced at the time of his accession. Over the course of his 16-year reign, the Chongzhen Emperor executed seven military governors, 11 regional commanders, replaced his minister of defence 14 times, and appointed an unprecedented 50 ministers to the Grand Secretariat (equivalent to the cabinet and chancellor).

== Consorts and issue ==
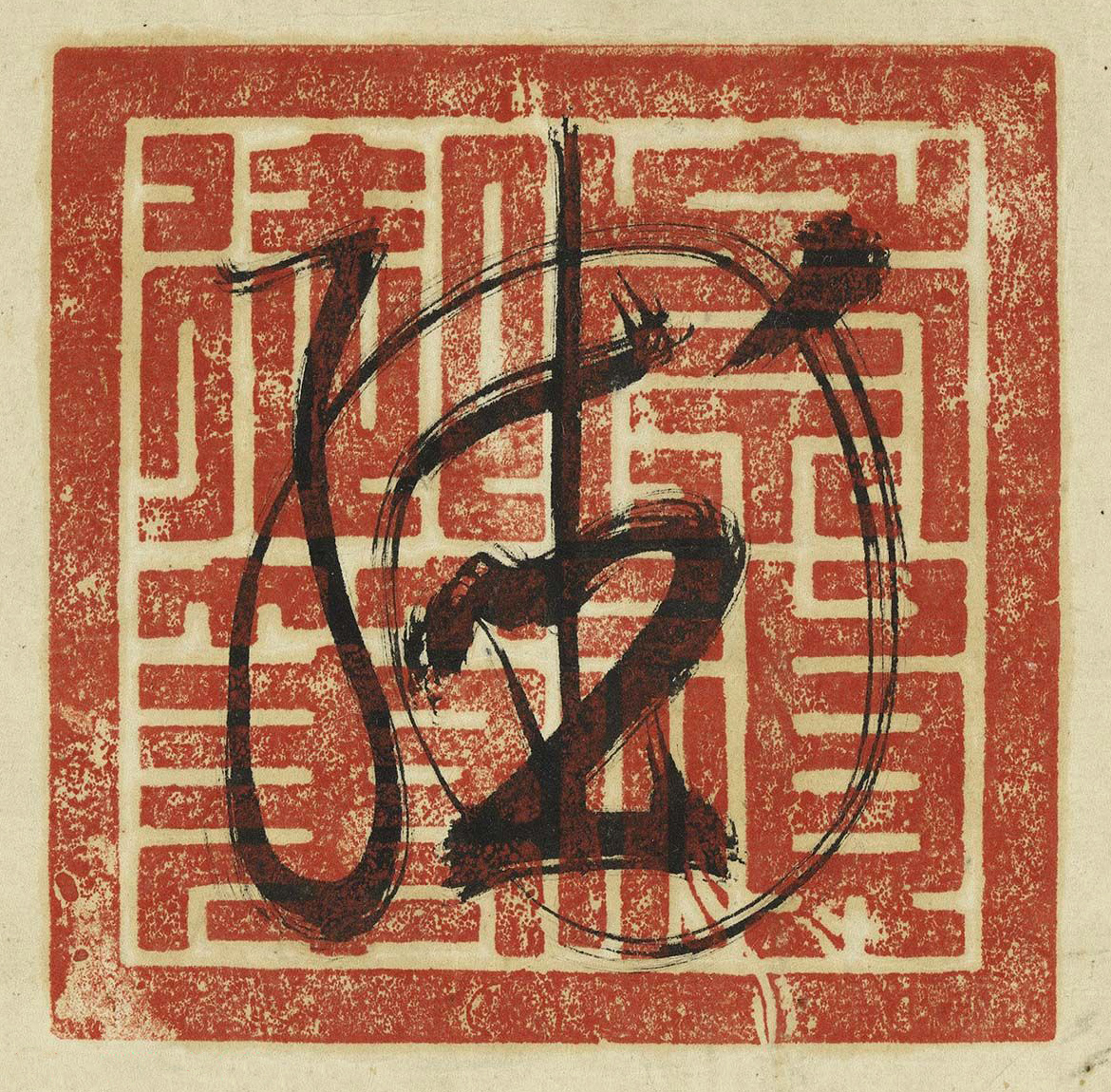
Personal seal and monogram (huaya) of the Chongzhen Emperor

- Empress Xiaojielie, of the Zhou clan (孝節烈皇后 周氏; 10 May 1611 – 24 April 1644)
  - Zhu Cilang, Crown Prince Xianmin (獻愍太子 朱慈烺; 26 February 1629 – 1644), first son
  - Zhu Cixuan, Prince Yin of Huai (懷隱王 朱慈烜; died 15 January 1630), second son
  - Princess Kunyi (坤儀公主; 1630 – 24 April 1644), first daughter
  - Zhu Cijiong, Prince Ai of Ding (定哀王 朱慈炯; b. 1632), third son
  - Princess Zhaoren (昭仁公主; 1639 – 24 April 1644), third daughter
- Imperial Noble Consort Gongshu, of the Tian clan (恭淑皇貴妃 田氏; 1611 – 16 October 1642), personal name Xiuying (秀英)
  - Zhu Cizhao, Prince Dao of Yong (永悼王 朱慈炤; b. 1632), fourth son
  - Zhu Cihuan, Prince Daoling (悼靈王 朱慈煥; 1633–1637), fifth son
  - Zhu Cican, Prince Daohuai (悼懷王 朱慈燦; 1637 – 5 May 1639), sixth son
  - Prince Daoliang (悼良王), seventh son
- Noble Consort, of the Yuan clan (貴妃 袁氏; 1616 – 24 April 1644)
  - Fourth daughter
- Consort Shun, of the Wang clan (順妃 王氏)
  - Princess Changping (長平公主; 1630–1646), personal name Meichuo (媺娖), second daughter
    - Married Zhou Xian (周顯) in 1644
- Consort, of the Shen clan (妃 沈氏)
- Consort, of the Wang clan (妃 王氏) (first)
- Consort, of the Wang clan (妃 王氏) (second)
- Consort, of the Liu clan (妃 劉氏)
- Consort, of the Fang clan (妃 方氏)
- Consort, of the You clan (妃 尤氏)
- Lady of Selected Service, of the Fan clan (選侍 范氏)
- Lady of Selected Service, of the Xue clan (選侍 薛氏)
- Yang Yanji (養豔姬)
- Lin Wanyu (藺婉玉)
- Unknown
  - Fifth daughter
  - Sixth daughter

== See also ==
- Chinese emperors family tree (late)

== Notes ==
Chongzhen Emperor House of Zhu Born: 6 February 1611 Died: 25 April 1644
Chinese royalty
New title	Prince of Xin; 1622–1627	Merged into the Crown
Regnal titles
Preceded by Tianqi Emperor	Emperor of the Ming dynasty 1627–1644	Succeeded by Hongguang Emperor (Southern Ming dynasty)
Preceded by Tianqi Emperor	Emperor of China; 1627–1644	Succeeded by Shunzhi Emperor (Qing dynasty)
