= Eunuch & Carpenter =

1993 Taiwanese television series

- Also known as: Da tai jian yu xiao mu jiang, The Big Eunuch and the Little Carpenter
- Chinese: 大太監與小木匠
- Hanyu Pinyin: Dà tài jiàn yǔ xiǎo mù jiàng
- Genre: Historical drama, Black Comedy
- Screenplay by: Chih-Hsiang Huang
- Directed by: Shao-feng Cheng
- Starring: Ke Huy Quan
- Opening theme: Wǒ bèi qīng chūn zhuàng lĕ yī xià yāo (我被青春撞了一下腰) performed by Chang Chen
- Ending theme: Rén shēngyǒu wèi (人生有味) performed by Ram Chiang
- Country of origin: Taiwan
- Original language: Mandarin
- No. of episodes: 40

Production
- Producers: Jui Lin; Chih-Hsiang Huang
- Production location: Taiwan
- Running time: 60 minutes per episode (including commercials)
- Production company: TTV

Original release
- Network: TTV
- Release: 15 November 1993 – 7 January 1994

Eunuch & Carpenter is a Taiwanese dramedy television series set in the period when the eunuch Wei Zhongxian controlled the Chinese imperial court. Directed by Shao-feng Cheng and produced by Jui Lin and Chih-Hsiang Huang, the series stars American actor Ke Huy Quan as Ba Da-jia, a fictional young carpenter who accidentally enters the palace and intervened in political battles and befriends the Tianqi Emperor. It was first broadcast in Taiwan on TTV from 15 November 1993 to 7 January 1994.

== Synopsis ==
Set in the Ming Dynasty, Zhu You-jiao ascends to the throne as the Tianqi Emperor at a young age. He was passionately more devoted to the crafts of carpentry and lacquerwork rather than fulfilling his responsibilities on state affairs, allowing the eunuch Wei Zhong-xian to gradually assume and handle them in his place.

To carry favor with the emperor, Wei Zhong-xian selected a young carpenter named Ba Da-jia from among thirty thousand boys to serve as a playmate for Emperor Zhu You-jiao. An imperial playmate was supposed to be a eunuch, but through a series of mishaps and coincidences, Ba Da-jia repeatedly manages to escape the castration procedure. Having grown accustomed to interacting with the emperor on equal footing, he sometimes forgets himself and treat the emperor as a brother. This was fine when the emperor is in high spirits from their play, but if the emperor is in a bad mood, this "brother" became a punching bag. Ba Da-jia's philosophy of life was: get by one day at a time, snatch whatever minor advantages he could, occasionally endure a slight loss but definitely seek payback later. However, if the other party was too powerful, then a nobleman would seek revenge even three years later, as the saying goes.

Such a person as Ba Da-jia, amidst the covert power struggles between the Donglin Movement, the Eunuch Faction, and the White Lotus Sect, became a sought-after person by all sides due to his close relationship with the emperor. However, leaning towards one side means offending another; while he could find favor with both, he is also liable to be blamed for the slightest mistakes. His only thoughts were on how to gain advantages and muddle through each day, yet he is constantly mistaken for someone vying for power and profit. The more he tries to avoid the scheming and intrigue of the upper echelons, the more he finds himself helplessly drawn into the vortex of political strife.

Only Yuan Xiao-yu and Zhang Qian, assistant instructors at the palace's Inner Study Hall, had some understanding of Ba Da-jia. A subtle love triangle developed among the three of them. However, as the political situation evolved, Yuan Xiao-yu became a remnant of the rebellious White Lotus Sect, and Zhang Qian became the descendant of rebels, causing Ba Da-jia's love life to inexplicably and dramatically intensify. With his lovers branded as "traitorous rebels", he had no choice but to become a martyr, whether he wanted to or not.

Wei Zhong-xian could not tolerate a single speck of dissent. Together with the emperor's wet nurse, Madam Ke, he continuously amassed power, consolidating his position by eliminating rivals. He kills political enemies, takes control of the Eastern Depot, eradicates the White Lotus Sect, and persecutes the Donglin Party, his authority reaching its zenith. His followers were so sycophantic that they would change their names while standing or acknowledge a villain as their father while sitting. Wei Zhong-xian increasingly views Ba Da-jia as a threat to his plans, determines to remove him at all costs.

Ba Da-jia becomes a wanted fugitive, fleeing for his life everywhere. In Suzhou, he witnesses the demise of the White Lotus Sect, and in Wuxi, he sees the suffering of the Donglin movement members. Yet, after returning to the capital having made a full circle, fate played its tricks: Ba Da-jia unexpectedly became the emperor's savior and an object of recruitment for Wang Ti-qian, a eunuch and political rival of Wei Zhong-xian. After the demise of Emperor Zhu You-xiao, the new emperor, Zhu You-jian (the Chongzhen Emperor who is Zhu You-xiao's brother), carefully launches a counterattack against Wei Zhong-xian, whose powers began to fall. Madam Ke is beaten to death by a group of vengeful palace maids, while Wei Zhong-xian hangs himself on his way to exile.

Zhu You-jian offers to appoint Ba Da-jia to an important position. However, seeing that the new emperor is once again surrounded by a fresh crowd of demons and monsters, Ba Da-jia refuses the offer, choosing not get involved in that mess. Instead, he left the capital with Yuan Xiao-yu and resumes his job as a carefree carpenter.

== Cast ==
- Ke Huy Quan as Ba Da-jia (voice by Shi Ban-Yu; Quan also voiced his own character in English dub)
- Ming-Chie Kuang as Yuan Xiao-yu
- Ku Feng as Wang An
- Chin Chi as Zhang Qian
- Chien Te-men as Li Jin-zhong (later Wei Zhongxian)
- Man-Ning Hsi as Madame Ke
- Min Chiang as Zhang Ben-ru
- Shao-feng Cheng as Yuan Bu-fan
- Siqin Gaowa as Consort Li
- Wen-shu Yang as Noble Consort Zheng
- Hsin-chih Chiu as Crown prince (later Tianqi Emperor)
- Ping-Chun Cheng as Ke Guang-xian
- Yu Wang as Taichang Emperor
- Kuei-Pei Chiang as Yang Lian
- Jing Fang as Ba Da-zhu
- Heng Yu as Wang Ti-qian
- Ling Huang as Empress Zhang
- Qing Zhao as Zhu You-jian
