= Ming Dynasty (disambiguation) =

The Ming dynasty (1368–1644) was an imperial dynasty of China.

Ming Dynasty may also refer to:

- Southern Ming (1644–1662), loyalist regimes in southern China following the Ming dynasty's collapse
- Ming Dynasty (horse), Australian Thoroughbred racehorse
- Ming Dynasty (2007 TV series), Chinese television series taking place during the reign of the 16th monarch, the Tianqi Emperor, 1620–1627
- Ming Dynasty (2019 TV series), Chinese television series also called Empress of Ming, which primarily takes place during the reigns of the 3rd to 8th emperors in the early to mid-1400s
- Yao Ming, an NBA player with the nickname Ming Dynasty
- The Khanate of Kokand in central Asia was also established by the Turkic Ming tribe

== See also ==
- Min kingdom, a 10th-century dynasty in modern Fujian
