= Ming Dynasty (2007 TV series) =

- DVD cover art
- Also known as: Tianxia
- 大明天下
- Genre: Historical drama
- Written by: Ma Weijun
- Directed by: Wu Ziniu
- Presented by: Jia Yun
- Starring: Wang Ya'nan; Song Jia; Wang Huichun; Jiang Xin; Tao Zeru; Nie Yuan; Du Zhiguo; Wan Hongjie; Rao Minli; Zong Fengyan; Xing Yufei; Heizi
- Opening theme: "Under Heaven" (天下) by Mao Ning
- Ending theme: "Folk Song" (江湖民谣) by Han Hong
- Composer: Wang Liguang
- Country of origin: China
- Original language: Mandarin
- No. of episodes: 42

Production
- Executive producer: Sima Xiaojia
- Producer: Jia Yun
- Production location: China
- Cinematography: Wang Yi; Zhang Wenjie; Ge Yansong
- Editors: Li Yuan; Fan Kun
- Running time: ≈45 minutes per episode
- Production company: Pikawang International Group

Original release
- Network: GZTV
- Release: 11 December 2007

Ming Dynasty (大明天下), also known as Tianxia (天下), is a Chinese historical television series based on the events of during the reign of the Tianqi Emperor of the Ming dynasty. It was directed by Wu Ziniu and was first broadcast on GZTV in China in December 2007.

== Synopsis ==
Set in 17th-century China during the reign of the Tianqi Emperor of the Ming dynasty, the series follows the power struggle in the Ming government between the reformist Donglin movement and the corrupt eunuch Wei Zhongxian. Wei Zhongxian, who controls the spy agency Eastern Depot and the secret police jinyiwei, persecutes his political opponents and dominates the government with support from Madam Ke, the emperor's former wet nurse.

After several of their members are killed, the Donglin movement's leader Yang Lian travels to Liaodong with his adopted son Qian Jiayi. With support from the emperor's brother Prince Xin, Yang Lian intends to join the general Xiong Tingbi in lodging a formal accusation of corruption against Wei Zhongxian. However, Wei Zhongxian turns the tables on them by framing them for conspiring with the Jurchens against the Ming Empire. Xiong Tingbi is arrested while Yang Lian publicly denounces Wei Zhongxian outside the Forbidden City before being detained. Qian Jiayi attempts to save them, but fails and both Xiong Tingbi and Yang Lian are executed.

Yang Lian's adopted daughter Murong Qiu attempts to avenge Yang Lian, but is unable to kill Wei Zhongxian. Wei Zhongxian then exploits the Tianqi Emperor's suspicions of his own family to stage an assassination attempt and frame Prince Xin for being the mastermind. Prince Xin is placed under arrest while three other princes are ordered to leave Beijing.

Qian Jiayi and Luo Yunpeng, a jinyiwei officer, uncover an attempt to murder the three princes. After the princes are poisoned, the physician Yu Qian'er helps them fake their deaths. The princes secretly return to the capital and accuse Wei Zhongxian of attempted murder in front of the Tianqi Emperor. However, Wei Zhongxian pushes the blame to his subordinates and escapes punishment. Prince Xin is put on trial for treason, but Qian Jiayi saves him and helps to clear his name.

Qian Jiayi learns that Yu Qian'er has been betrothed to him since childhood, so they marry. Murong Qiu, who has feelings for Qian Jiayi, leaves Beijing with Luo Yunpeng. Qian Jiayi is promoted to a higher position in the Ministry of Justice, but soon gets involved in another conspiracy when his pregnant wife is accused of participating in the earlier attempt to assassinate the emperor.

Yu Qian'er reveals that Wei Zhongxian's agents have captured her father and forced her to join an assassin organisation, though she denies participating in the attack on the emperor. Qian Jiayi, after listening to her, concludes that Wei Zhongxian is targeting Yu Qian'er to destroy both himself and Prince Xin. As he investigates further, a mysterious figure repeatedly shows up to protect him when he is in danger and leads him to evidence of Wei Zhongxian's crimes. Qian Jiayi is consequently drawn into a wider conflict between Wei Zhongxian, Prince Xin, the surviving Donglin members, and the shadowy groups operating in the Ming government.

== Cast ==
- Wang Ya'nan as Zhu Youxiao, the Tianqi Emperor
- Song Jia as Madam Ke
- Wang Huichun as Wei Zhongxian
- Jiang Xin as Murong Qiu
- Tao Zeru as Wang Linguang
- Nie Yuan as Mu Yunzhou
- Du Zhiguo as Yang Lian
- Wan Hongjie as Qian Jiayi
- Rao Minli as Yu Qian'er
- Zong Fengyan as Zhu Youjian, Prince Xin
- Xing Yufei as Empress Zhang
- Heizi as Luo Yunpeng
- Xi Yuli as Lady Zhou, Princess Consort Xin
- Chen Kai as Wu Dajin
- Zhang Jin as Wu Erjin
- Yao Di as Xiaohong
- Ma Yuke as Zhou Jiyuan
- Wang Jiahe as Ke Guangxian
- Gao Tianhao as Cui Chengxiu
- Dong Ziwu as Zhu Changhao, Prince Rui
- Yu Lei as Zhu Changrun, Prince Hui
- Wang Zhengjia as Tian Ergeng
- Yang Hongtao as Wang Tiqian
- Wu Yujin as Miao Yun
- Wang Jianing as Liu Quanhong
- Wang Zhongwei as Wu Ping
- Gu Haibo as Wang Yucheng
- Zhao Changzhou as Ye Changbao
- Guo Jia as Ye Changhu
- Zhou Yanxing as Xiaoling'er
- Wu Yuyang as Xiaoyu'er
- Shu Yan as Concubine Yang
- Guo Yongzhen as Xu Xianchun
