= List of awards and nominations received by Ke Huy Quan =

Ke Huy Quan awards and nominations
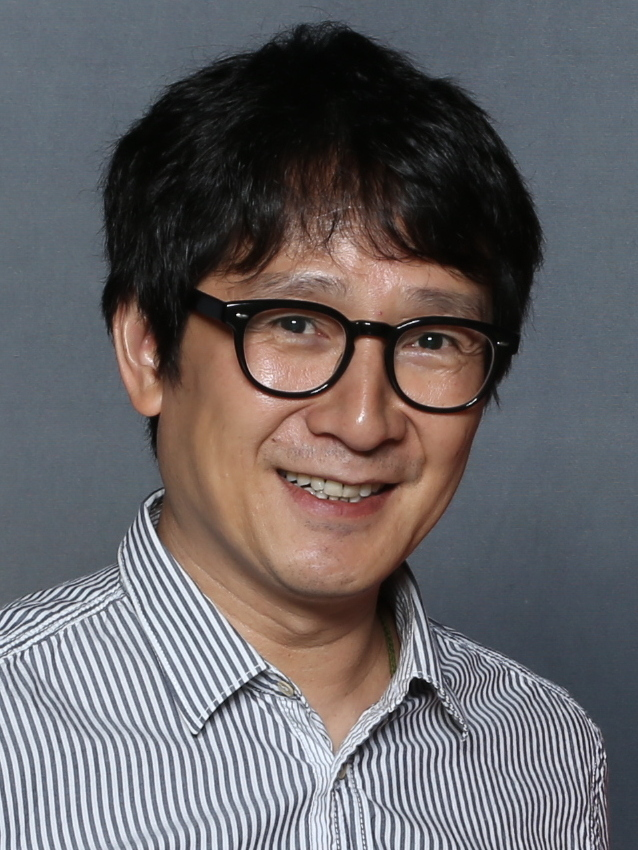
- Quan in 2018
Awards and nominations
Award	Wins	Nominations
Academy Awards	1	1
Actor Awards	2	2
BAFTA Awards	0	1
Critics' Choice Awards	2	5
Golden Globe Awards	1	1

Ke Huy Quan gained prominence for his early roles in the action-adventure films Indiana Jones and the Temple of Doom (1984), and The Goonies (1985) as well as in the sitcom Together We Stand (1986-1987). For his performance in the 2022 science fiction comedy-drama film Everything Everywhere All at Once, Quan garnered critical acclaim and many accolades, including an Academy Award, a Golden Globe Award, an Independent Spirit Award, two Screen Actors Guild Awards, as well as a nomination for a BAFTA Award.

Quan is one of two actors of Asian descent to win an Academy Award for Best Supporting Actor, the other being Haing S. Ngor in 1985. He also became the first Vietnam-born actor in history to win an Oscar. Quan was the first Asian man to win any individual category at the Screen Actors Guild Awards, as well as the first Vietnamese-American actor to be nominated in the supporting category. (Note: Multiple sources.)

== Major associations ==
=== Academy Awards ===
Year	Category	Nominated work	Result	Ref.
2023	Best Supporting Actor	Everything Everywhere All at Once	Won	

=== Actor Awards ===
Year	Category	Nominated work	Result	Ref.
2023	Outstanding Performance by a Male Actor in a Supporting Role	Everything Everywhere All at Once	Won	
2023	Outstanding Performance by a Cast in a Motion Picture	Everything Everywhere All at Once	Won	

=== BAFTA Awards ===
Year	Category	Nominated work	Result	Ref.
British Academy Film Awards
2023	Best Actor in a Supporting Role	Everything Everywhere All at Once	Nominated	

=== Critics' Choice Awards ===
Year	Category	Nominated work	Result	Ref.
Critics' Choice Movie Awards
2023	Best Supporting Actor	Everything Everywhere All at Once	Won	
2023	Best Acting Ensemble	Everything Everywhere All at Once	Nominated	
Critics' Choice Super Awards
2023	Best Actor in a Science Fiction/Fantasy Movie	Everything Everywhere All at Once	Won	
2024	Best Actor in a Superhero Series, Limited Series or Made-for-TV Movie	Loki	Nominated	
Critics' Choice Television Awards
2024	Best Supporting Actor in a Drama Series	Loki	Nominated	

=== Golden Globe Awards ===
Year	Category	Nominated work	Result	Ref.
2023	Best Supporting Actor – Motion Picture	Everything Everywhere All at Once	Won	

== Other associations ==
Organizations (Note: Awards, festivals, honors and other miscellaneous organizations are listed in alphabetical order.)	Year (Note: Year in which award ceremony was held.)	Category	Work	Result	Ref.
AACTA International Awards	2023	Best Supporting Actor	Everything Everywhere All at Once	Nominated	
AARP Movies for Grownups Awards	2023	Best Supporting Actor	Everything Everywhere All at Once	Nominated	
Alliance of Women Film Journalists	2023	Best Actor in a Supporting Role	Everything Everywhere All at Once	Won	
Astra Film Awards	2023	Best Supporting Actor	Everything Everywhere All at Once	Won	
Astra Film Awards	2023	Best Cast Ensemble	Everything Everywhere All at Once	Won	
Astra Midseason Film Awards	2022	Best Supporting Actor	Everything Everywhere All at Once	Won	
Astra TV Awards	2024	Best Supporting Actor in a Streaming Series, Comedy	American Born Chinese	Nominated	
Astra TV Awards	2024	Best Supporting Actor in a Streaming Drama Series	Loki	Nominated	
Austin Film Critics Association	2023	Best Supporting Actor	Everything Everywhere All at Once	Won	
Austin Film Critics Association	2023	Best Ensemble	Everything Everywhere All at Once	Won	
Boston Online Film Critics Association	2022	Best Supporting Actor	Everything Everywhere All at Once	Won	
Boston Society of Film Critics	2022	Best Supporting Actor	Everything Everywhere All at Once	Won	
Character Media	2022	Unforgettable Gala – Asian American Awards	Everything Everywhere All at Once	Won	
Chicago Film Critics Association	2022	Best Supporting Actor	Everything Everywhere All at Once	Won	
Dallas–Fort Worth Film Critics Association	2022	Best Supporting Actor	Everything Everywhere All at Once	Won	
Dorian Awards	2023	Supporting Film Performance of the Year	Everything Everywhere All at Once	Won	
Florida Film Critics Circle	2022	Best Supporting Actor	Everything Everywhere All at Once	Won	
Florida Film Critics Circle	2022	Best Ensemble	Everything Everywhere All at Once	Won	
Georgia Film Critics Association	2023	Best Supporting Actor	Everything Everywhere All at Once	Won	
Georgia Film Critics Association	2023	Best Ensemble	Everything Everywhere All at Once	Runner-up	
Gold List	2023	Best Performance in a Supporting Role	Everything Everywhere All at Once	Won	
Gotham Awards	2022	Outstanding Supporting Performance	Everything Everywhere All at Once	Won	
Houston Film Critics Society	2023	Best Supporting Actor	Everything Everywhere All at Once	Won	
Houston Film Critics Society	2023	Best Ensemble Cast	Everything Everywhere All at Once	Nominated	
IGN Summer Movie Awards	2022	Best Lead Performer in a Movie	Everything Everywhere All at Once	Nominated	
Independent Spirit Awards	2023	Best Supporting Performance	Everything Everywhere All at Once	Won	
International Cinephile Society	2023	Best Supporting Actor	Everything Everywhere All at Once	Nominated	
Kansas City Film Critics Circle	2023	Best Supporting Actor	Everything Everywhere All at Once	Won	
Las Vegas Film Critics Society	2022	Best Supporting Actor	Everything Everywhere All at Once	Won	
London Film Critics' Circle	2023	Supporting Actor of the Year	Everything Everywhere All at Once	Nominated	
Los Angeles Film Critics Association	2022	Best Supporting Performance	Everything Everywhere All at Once	Won (Note: Shared with Dolly de Leon.)	
National Society of Film Critics	2023	Best Supporting Actor	Everything Everywhere All at Once	Won	
New York Film Critics Circle	2022	Best Supporting Actor	Everything Everywhere All at Once	Won	
Online Film Critics Society	2023	Best Supporting Actor	Everything Everywhere All at Once	Won	
Phoenix Film Critics Society	2022	Best Supporting Actor	Everything Everywhere All at Once	Won	
Phoenix Film Critics Society	2022	Best Ensemble Acting	Everything Everywhere All at Once	Won	
San Diego Film Critics Society	2023	Best Supporting Actor	Everything Everywhere All at Once	Nominated	
San Diego Film Critics Society	2023	Best Ensemble	Everything Everywhere All at Once	Won	
San Francisco Bay Area Film Critics Circle	2023	Best Supporting Actor	Everything Everywhere All at Once	Won	
Satellite Awards	2023	Best Actor in a Supporting Role	Everything Everywhere All at Once	Won	
Saturn Awards	1985	Best Juvenile Performance	Indiana Jones and the Temple of Doom	Nominated	
Saturn Awards	2022	Best Supporting Actor in a Film	Everything Everywhere All at Once	Won	
Saturn Awards	2025	Best Guest Star in a Television Series	Loki	Nominated	
Seattle Film Critics Society	2023	Best Actor in a Supporting Role	Everything Everywhere All at Once	Won	
Southeastern Film Critics Association	2022	Best Supporting Actor	Everything Everywhere All at Once	Won	
St. Louis Film Critics Association	2022	Best Supporting Actor	Everything Everywhere All at Once	Won	
St. Louis Film Critics Association	2022	Best Ensemble	Everything Everywhere All at Once	Nominated	
Toronto Film Critics Association	2023	Best Supporting Actor	Everything Everywhere All at Once	Won	
Vancouver Film Critics Circle	2023	Best Supporting Actor	Everything Everywhere All at Once	Nominated	
Washington D.C. Area Film Critics Association	2022	Best Supporting Actor	Everything Everywhere All at Once	Won	
Washington D.C. Area Film Critics Association	2022	Best Ensemble	Everything Everywhere All at Once	Nominated	
Washington D.C. Area Film Critics Association	2025	Best Voice Performance	Zootopia 2	Nominated	
Women Film Critics Circle	2022	Best Screen Couple	Everything Everywhere All at Once	Won (Note: Shared with Michelle Yeoh)	
Young Artist Award	1984	Best Young Supporting Actor in a Motion Picture	Indiana Jones and the Temple of Doom	Won	
Young Artist Award	1986	Best Young Actor in a New Series	Together We Stand	Won	

== Honors ==
Organization	Year	Honor	Ref.
Carnegie Corporation of New York	2026	Great Immigrants Award	
Santa Barbara International Film Festival	2023	Virtuosos Award	
