= Hand of Death (1975 film) =

1975 Hong Kong film by John Woo

- Theatrical poster
- Directed by: John Woo
- Written by: John Woo
- Produced by: Raymond Chow; Peng Chien
- Starring: Doran Tan; James Tien; Jackie Chan; Sammo Hung
- Cinematography: Liang Yung-chi
- Edited by: Chang Yau-chung; Yuan Tung-chun
- Music by: Joseph Koo
- Distributed by: Golden Harvest
- Release dates: August 23, 1975 (South Korea); July 15, 1976 (Hong Kong)
- Running time: 95 minutes
- Country: Hong Kong
- Language: Mandarin
- Box office: HK$797,921.20

Hand of Death (simplified Chinese: 少林门; traditional Chinese: 少林門; pinyin: shǎolínmén, also known as Countdown in Kung Fu) is a 1975 Hong Kong vigilante martial arts film written and directed by John Woo, who also has a small role. The film stars Doran Tan, James Tien, Jackie Chan and Sammo Hung in pivotal roles and features cameo appearances by Yuen Biao, Yuen Wah, and Chiang Sheng. In addition to their acting roles, Hung also worked as stunt co-ordinator, whilst Biao (as well as additional stunt work from Chan) also performed much of the stuntwork, including doubling for both of the principal stars.

== Plot ==
During the Qing Dynasty the Shaolin disciples are hunted down by a powerful warrior, Shih Shao-Feng, who wants to rid China of the Shaolin. At a remote training camp a group of Shaolin train together. Their best student Yun Fei is given the task of taking down Shih and his reign of terror. Along the way he befriends Tan Feng, who is a blacksmith.

Yun Fei arrives at Shih's camp and tries to take him, but fails. His Shaolin techniques are useless against Shih's "extended iron claw". When Shih beats him, he leaves the rest to his eight bodyguards, who each have weapons such as swords, shields and spears.

Yun Fei escapes with the help of the blacksmith, goes to a village and discovers Shih's men are taking apart the village and pillaging anything they can to scare the villagers into submission.

Tan befriends two people along the way, including a brilliant swordsman who has never drawn his sword after he accidentally killed a prostitute he loved.

The team forms a coalition to defeat Shih Shao-Feng.

With battle plans laid and the heroes trained, they prepare themselves for the battle ahead of them. After their training, Yun Fei's friends cut off his queue. Yun Fei and all the heroes will create a diversion, where they will assail Shih's headquarters in separate groups.

The diversion and ambush on the following day is ultimately successful. Luring away Shih's lieutenant Tu Ching. Tan Feng is the first to act in the climactic battle. Arriving at the gate of the pagoda which is the stronghold of Shih Shao-Feng, he proceeds to kill off several guards, including two of Shih's elite fighters. The rest of the characters reach a grassland where four more elite fighters under Shih's command come by, leading to a prolonged fight between the heroes and four more of Shih's warriors.

Unfortunately for Yun Fei's gang, the battle goes on longer than anticipated, and Shih realises their plans. Tan Feng returns to rendezvous with his friends and assist them in battle, but is mortally wounded whilst killing another elite. Yun Fei and the other heroes manage to kill the rest of the elite fighters and they escape, with Shih, Du and a small troop of their men in pursuit.

More and more of the heroes are killed as the film reaches its end, while on a nearby beach Yun Fei beats Tu to death and kills off Shih's last elite fighter.

In the end, Yun Fei faces off against Shih and his remaining soldiers, defeating them all single-handedly, and then fights Shih and wins.

The movie ends with Yun Fei riding past the graves of all his friends, paying his respects.

== Cast ==
- Dorian Tan as Yun Fei
- James Tien as Shih Shao-Feng
- Jackie Chan (Credited as Chen Yuen Lung) as Tan Feng (Also a Stunt Double for Dorian Tan)
- Sammo Hung as Officer Tu Ching (as Hung Chin-Pao)
- Yeung Wai as Zorro, "The Wanderer"
- Kim Ki-Joo as Ma Lieh, "Smiling Fox"
- Chu Ching as Autumn Moon
- Jin Bong Jin as Patriot Chui Guo
- John Woo as Scholar Cheng
- Yuen Wah as Shih's Bodyguard with Spear
- Jang Jeong-Kuk as Shih's Bodyguard
- Jo Choon as Shih's Bodyguard
- To Wai-wo as Shih's Bodyguard with Twin Swords
- Tong Kam-Tong as Shih's Bodyguard with Spear
- Lam Hak-ming as Shih's Bodyguard with Chain Whip
- Shin Chan-il as Shih's Bodyguard
- Mang Ding-Goh as Shih's Bodyguard
- Yuen Biao as Arrow Guard killed by Shih (Cameo/Stunt Double)
- Wilson Tong as Senior Shaolin Student (Cameo)
- Kao Chiang as Tan Xiong, "Tan Feng's Elder Brother" (Cameo)
- Robert Tai as Ching's Soldier
- Philip Kwok as Ching's Soldier
- Chiang Sheng as Shaolin Student
- Lu Feng as Shaolin Student
- Ricky Cheng as Shaolin Student
- Wang Chi Sheng as Shaolin Student

== Production ==
According to his book I Am Jackie Chan: My Life in Action, Chan was completely knocked unconscious when he did the stunts on this film. Woo recalled that the stunt, which involved Chan getting launched back by wires after getting kicked mid-air, caused Chan to land on his head and become unconscious for around 20 minutes.

== Trivia ==
This is the only film collaboration from both Golden Trio of members from members of Seven Little Fortunes from China Drama Academy with Jackie Chan, Sammo Hung, and Yuen Biao, and Shaw Brothers, Venom Mob fame from Taiwanese Fu Sheng Opera School with Chiang Sheng, Lu Feng and Philip Kwok, were involved together.

== See also ==
- Jackie Chan filmography
- List of Hong Kong films of 1976
- Sammo Hung filmography
- Yuen Biao filmography
- Yuen Wah filmography
