= Boxer's Adventure =

1979 film

- The Boxers Adventure film poster
- Chinese: 神拳霸腿追魂手
- Hanyu Pinyin: Shén Quán Bà Tuǐ Zhuī Hún Shǒu
- Jyutping: San^{4} Kyun^{4} Baa^{3} Teoi^{2} Zeoi^{1} Wan^{4} Sau^{2}
- Directed by: Tyrone Shu; Chia Chih Li
- Written by: Cheung San-Yee
- Produced by: Ng Yuk-Wan
- Starring: Meng Fei; Tao-liang Tan; Blacky Ko; Jack Lung Sai-Ga; Lung Tien-Hsiang
- Cinematography: Wan Wen Liao
- Edited by: Wong Chun-San
- Music by: Fu Liang Chou
- Release date: 30 November 1977
- Running time: 93 minutes
- Country: Taiwan
- Languages: Cantonese; Mandarin

Boxer's Adventure (Chinese: 神拳霸腿追魂手), also released as The Boxer's of Shaolin, is a 1977 Taiwan martial arts action film starring Tao-liang Tan and Jack Lung Sai-Ga.

== Plot ==
When the evil Yun Shi Kai threatens to take control of the local province, the royal minister realises that he must build an army to defeat him. He travels to Tiger village where he enlists the help of three of their finest fighters to aid him in his quest. They are teamed with Captain Lee (Tao-liang Tan) and sent out in advance to prepare the villages for the minister's arrival. Along the way they encounter ambushes, romantic interludes and devious plots that all threaten to stop them from completing their duties.

== Cast ==
- Tao-liang Tan as Captain Lee Tak Wai
- Meng Fei as Chang Liu
- Jack Lung Sai-Ga as Chow San
- Blacky Ko as Lin Tien Kuen
- Lung Tien-Hsiang as Ghost Palm Wei Ching
- Wang Hsieh as Dong Zhong Cheng
- Chang Chi-Ping as Steel Palm Seven
- Cheung Wai as Wong Jing
- Lung Suen as Governor Cai
- Su Chiang as Chief of Hubao Clan

== Reception ==
In a film review, Nanyang Siang Pau said Boxer's Adventure had "a humorous plot and dialogue and a novel style, presenting a new way to meet the audience". The Shin Min Daily News found in a review that the film had "several scenes of exciting fights".
