= Ke Huy Quan =

American actor (born 1970)

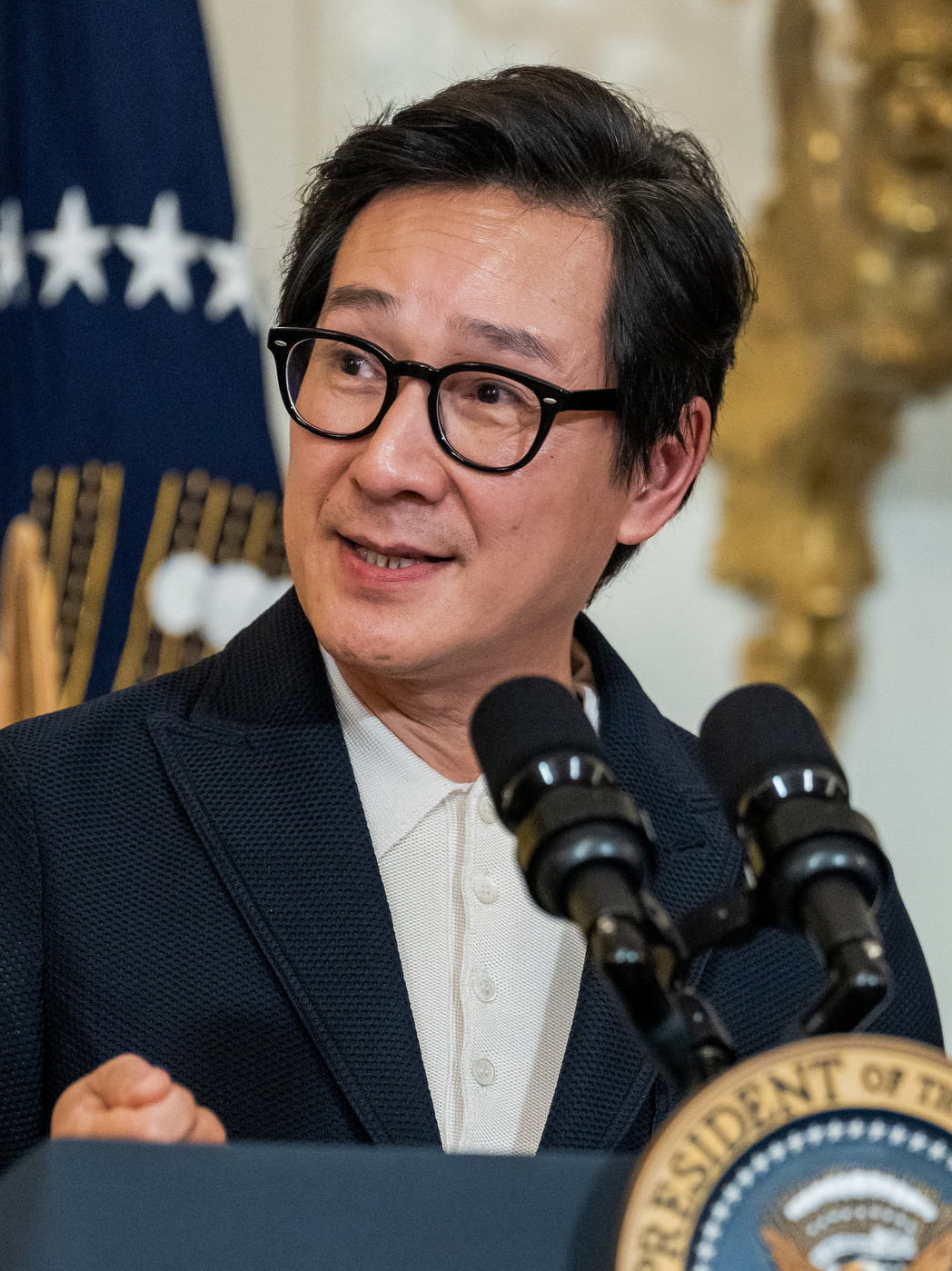
- Quan at the White House in 2023
- Born: 1970 (age 55–56); Saigon, South Vietnam
- Other names: Jonathan Ke Quan; Jonathan Quan
- Citizenship: United States
- Education: University of Southern California (BFA)
- Occupations: Actor; stunt coordinator; assistant director
- Years active: 1984–2002; 2021–present
- Spouse: Echo Quan
- Awards: Full list

Chinese name
- Traditional Chinese: 關繼威
- Simplified Chinese: 关继威
Transcriptions
Standard Mandarin
- Hanyu Pinyin: Guān Jìwēi
Yue: Cantonese
- Yale Romanization: Gwāan Gaiwāi

Vietnamese name
- Vietnamese alphabet: Quan Kế Huy

Ke Huy Quan (/ˌkiː.hwiː.ˈkwɑːn/ KEE-hwee-KWAHN; Vietnamese: Quan Kế Huy; (Note: The Sino-Vietnamese rendition of the Chinese 關繼威, and the basis for the Anglicized form. However Huy is an incorrect reading of Sino-Vietnamese Uy 威.) born 1970), also known as Jonathan Ke Quan, is an American actor. His accolades include an Academy Award and a Golden Globe Award, as well as a nomination for a BAFTA Award. Time magazine named Quan one of the 100 most influential people in the world in 2023.

Born in South Vietnam, Quan was admitted with his family to the United States as part of the Refugee Admissions Program. As a child actor, he rose to fame playing Short Round in Indiana Jones and the Temple of Doom (1984) and Richard "Data" Wang in The Goonies (1985). Following a few roles as a young adult in the 1990s, including as Jasper Kwong in the fourth and fifth seasons of ABC sitcom Head of the Class, Quan took a 19-year acting hiatus, during which he worked as a stunt choreographer and assistant director.

Quan returned to acting with the Netflix film Finding ʻOhana (2021), followed by the critically acclaimed Everything Everywhere All at Once (2022), a performance that won him various accolades, including the Academy Award for Best Supporting Actor. He is the first Vietnam-born actor to win an Academy Award and one of only two actors of Asian descent to win Best Supporting Actor, following Haing S. Ngor. Quan has since starred in the second season of the Disney+ series Loki (2023), and in the animated films Kung Fu Panda 4 (2024) and Zootopia 2 (2025).

== Early life ==
Quan was born in 1970 into a family of ethnic Chinese in Saigon, the capital of South Vietnam. The family emigrated three years after the Vietnam War ended in 1975. Quan, along with his father and five siblings, went to Hong Kong, while his mother and three other siblings went to Malaysia. After staying at a refugee camp in Hong Kong, the entire family was admitted to the United States as part of the Refugee Admissions Program in 1979. Quan grew up in California and attended the Mount Gleason Junior High School in Sunland-Tujunga, Los Angeles, and Alhambra High School in Alhambra, and ultimately graduating from South Hills High School in West Covina.

== Career ==
=== 1984–1999: Early career ===
Quan became a child actor at age 13, starring as Harrison Ford's 12-year-old sidekick Short Round in the Steven Spielberg film Indiana Jones and the Temple of Doom in 1984. The casting director auditioned a number of children at Castelar Elementary School, including Quan's younger brother. He described the role as "one of the happiest times of my life". For his performance, he was nominated for the Saturn Award for Best Performance by a Younger Actor. In 1985, Quan co-starred in The Goonies as a member of the eponymous group of children, the inventor Richard "Data" Wang. He played a pickpocket orphan in the 1986 Taiwanese movie It Takes a Thief. In 1987, he appeared in the Japanese movie Passengers (Passenjā Sugisarishi Hibi) with the Japanese idol singer Minako Honda. He played Sam on the short-lived TV series Together We Stand (1986–1987) and played Jasper Kwong in the sitcom Head of the Class from 1990 to 1991. In 1991, he starred in the movie Breathing Fire, and had a small role in Encino Man the following year. He played the starring role in the 1993 Mandarin-language Taiwan TV show Eunuch & Carpenter, which ran for forty episodes. He also starred in the 1996 Hong Kong-Vietnam co-production Red Pirate.

He studied Taekwondo under Philip Tan on the set of Indiana Jones and the Temple of Doom, and later trained under Tan Tao-liang.

=== 2000–2020: Acting sabbatical and other work ===
As an adult, Quan found it difficult to find acting work in the United States. He eventually quit acting and enrolled in the film program at the University of Southern California. During his time there, he edited a comedy horror short film titled Voodoo alongside his friend and fellow student Gregg Bishop, who directed the film. Voodoo won the Audience Award at the 2000 Slamdance Film Festival, and continues to be shown to USC students to this day. After graduating from USC, Quan was asked by Corey Yuen to go to Toronto, Ontario, to help choreograph fighting sequences in X-Men (2000). For the next decade, he worked behind the scenes on various productions in Asia and the United States. He again helped Yuen as a stunt choreographer for The One (2001). Quan worked as assistant director on Wong Kar-wai's 2046 (2004).

=== 2021–present: Return to acting ===
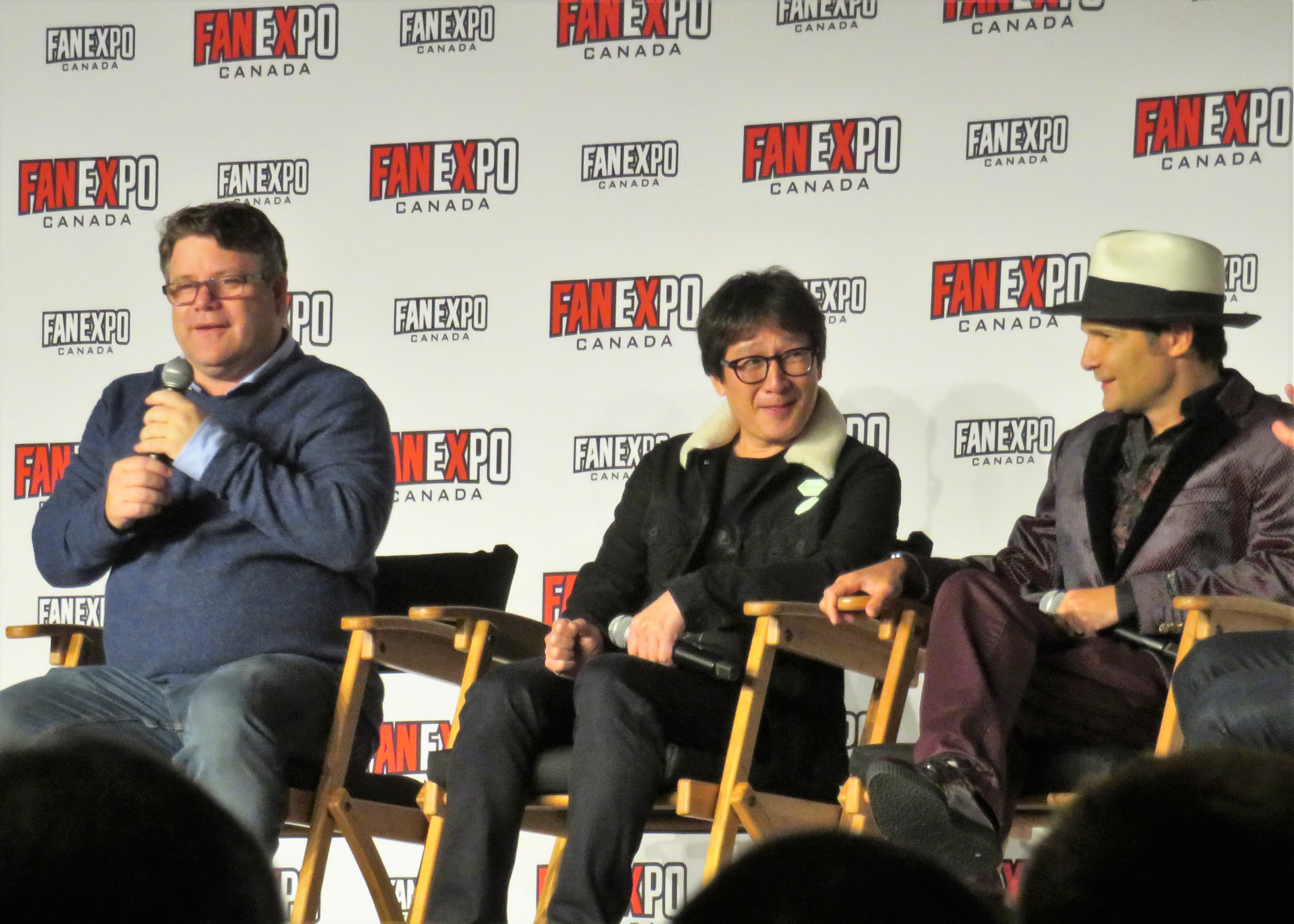
Sean Astin, Quan, and Corey Feldman at The Goonies panel, 2019 Fan Expo Toronto

Quan was inspired to return to acting following the success of Crazy Rich Asians in 2018. In 2019, he was cast in a supporting role in the Netflix film Finding ʻOhana, released in 2021. Quan approached director Jude Weng after overhearing her describing the film as The Goonies meets Indiana Jones, in both of which Quan had appeared. That same year, the filmmaking duo Daniels began casting for their film Everything Everywhere All at Once. They struggled to cast an actor in the role of Waymond Wang, a character who would appear in three different incarnations of the film. Co-director Daniel Kwan stumbled upon Quan on Twitter. Two weeks after getting a talent agent, Quan received a call to audition for the film. In January 2020, Quan was announced as a cast member of Everything Everywhere All at Once. The film was released in March 2022 to overwhelming acclaim, becoming the most-awarded film of all time, with Quan's performance receiving near unanimous praise and media attention, eventually leading to him winning a Golden Globe, a Screen Actors Guild Award and an Academy Award for his role. The Screen Actors Guild Award win made him the first Asian man to win any individual category at the Screen Actors Guild Awards, with his win of the Screen Actors Guild Award for Outstanding Performance by a Male Actor in a Supporting Role. He was the first Vietnamese-American actor to be nominated in that category. Quan is one of two actors of Asian descent to win an Academy Award for Best Supporting Actor, the other being Haing S. Ngor in 1985, and is the first Vietnamese-born actor to win an Academy Award.

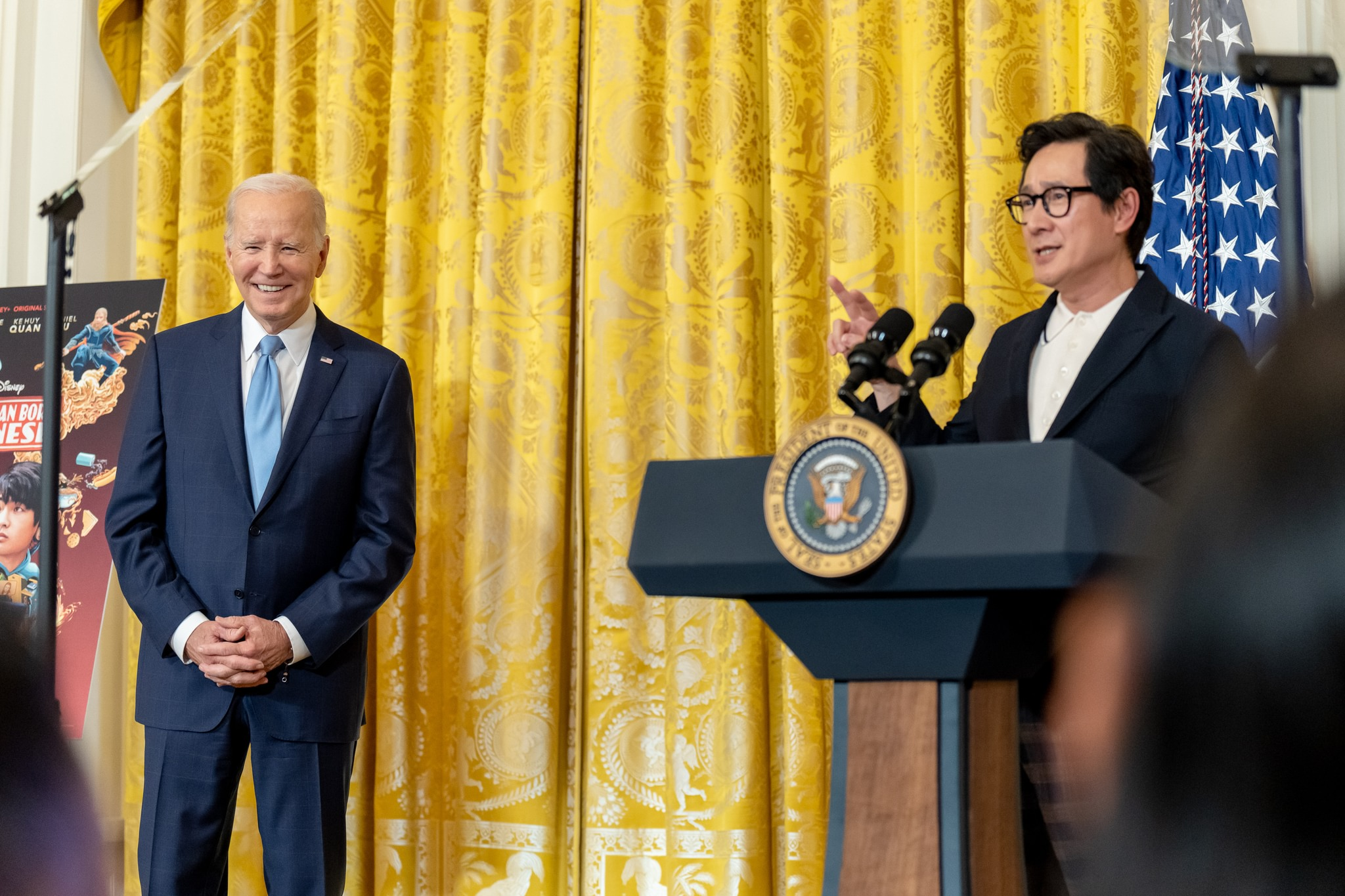
President Joe Biden and Quan at the White House in 2023

In February 2022, it was announced that he had joined the cast of the TV adaptation of American Born Chinese for Disney+, which was subsequently released in May 2023. In September 2022, Quan was announced to have joined the cast for the second season of the Marvel Cinematic Universe series Loki for Disney+, which premiered on October 6, 2023, casting him as Ouroboros, the head of the Time Variance Authority's Repairs and Advancement Department. For his performance he received a Critics' Choice Television Award for Best Supporting Actor in a Drama Series nomination. In June 2023, it was announced that he had been invited to join the Academy of Motion Picture Arts and Sciences as an actor. He had a voice role in Kung Fu Panda 4 (2024). Quan has later then starred in a leading role in Love Hurts (2025), and starred in The Electric State, alongside Millie Bobby Brown and Chris Pratt. He voiced Gary De'Snake in Zootopia 2 (2025), and will voice the character again in Zootopia 3. Quan returned to play Ouroboros in Avengers Endgame: Encore in an uncredited role, and is expected to return as the character again in Avengers: Doomsday.

== Personal life ==
Quan is of Han Chinese ancestry from the Hoa ethnic minority group of Vietnam. He is a Buddhist. He speaks English, Cantonese, and Mandarin. Quan is married to Echo Quan, who served as the on-set interpreter for Everything Everywhere All at Once, and resides in Woodland Hills, Los Angeles. Quan holds a second-degree black belt in taekwondo; he started taking classes after learning from a taekwondo instructor for his role in Indiana Jones and the Temple of Doom. He remains close friends with his Goonies co-star Jeff Cohen, who is also Quan's entertainment lawyer and helped Quan negotiate his contract to star in Everything Everywhere All at Once.

== Filmography ==
Key
†	Denotes films that have not yet been released

=== Film ===
Year	Title	Role	Notes	Ref.
1984	Indiana Jones and the Temple of Doom	Short Round		
1985	The Goonies	Richard "Data" Wang		
1986	It Takes a Thief	Little Guan		
1987	Passenger	Rick		
1991	Breathing Fire	Charlie Moore		
1992	Encino Man	Kim		
1996	Red Pirate	Kwan Chia Chiang		
2002	Second Time Around	Sing Wong		
2021	Finding ʻOhana	George Phan		
2022	Everything Everywhere All at Once	Waymond Wang		
2024	Kung Fu Panda 4	Han (voice)		
2025	Love Hurts	Marvin Gable		
2025	The Electric State	Dr. Clark Amherst / P.C. (voice)		
2025	Zootopia 2	Gary De'Snake (voice)		
2026	Avatar Aang: The Last Airbender	Avatar Xian (voice)		
2026	Avengers Endgame: Encore	Ouroboros	Uncredited; extended version of Avengers: Endgame	
2026	Avengers: Doomsday †	Ouroboros	Post-production	

=== Other credits ===
Year	Title	Role	Ref.
2000	X-Men	Assistant fight choreographer, translator	
2001	The One	Assistant action choreography director	
2004	2046	Assistant director	

=== Television ===
Year	Title	Role	Notes	Ref.
1986–1987	Together We Stand	Sam Randall	19 episodes	
1990–1991	Head of the Class	Jasper Kwong	Main cast (seasons 4–5)	
1991	Tales from the Crypt	Josh	Episode: "Undertaking Palor"	
1993	Eunuch & Carpenter	Ba Dajia	Main role; 40 episodes	
2023	American Born Chinese	Jamie Yao / Freddy Wong	Main role	
2023	Loki	Ouroboros "OB" / A.D. Doug	Season 2; Main role	
2025	The White Lotus	Kenneth "Kenny" Nguyen	Episode: "Special Treatments"; voice only, uncredited	

== Accolades ==
In 2023, Quan won a Golden Globe Award and an Academy Award, for Best Supporting Actor, for his role in Everything Everywhere All at Once (2022). He was the first Asian man to win any individual category at the Screen Actors Guild Awards for the same role, as well as the first Vietnamese-American actor to be nominated in the supporting category.

In 2023, Quan was an honoree of the Carnegie Corporation of New York's Great Immigrant Award.

== See also ==
- Asian Americans in arts and entertainment
- List of Academy Award winners and nominees of Asian descent

== Bibliography ==
- Holmstrom, John. The Moving Picture Boy: An International Encyclopaedia from 1895 to 1995. Norwich, Michael Russell, 1996, p. 387.
