= Breathing Fire =

1992 American martial arts film

- Film poster
- Directed by: Brandon De-Wilde (co-directed); Lou Kennedy
- Written by: Raymond Mahoney; Wayne John
- Story by: Delon Tanners
- Produced by: Raymond Mahoney
- Starring: Ke Huy Quan; Eddie Saavedra; Ed Neil; Jerry Trimble; Bolo Yeung; Wendell C. Whitaker
- Cinematography: Henry Chinon
- Edited by: Rick Mitchell; William Young
- Music by: Paul Hertzog
- Production companies: Golden Pacific Films & Arts
- Distributed by: Scanbox Entertainment
- Release dates: January 16, 1991 (Sweden); July 15, 1992 (United States)
- Running time: 85 minutes
- Country: United States
- Language: English

Breathing Fire is a 1991 American martial arts film directed by Lou Kennedy in his directorial debut, and co-directed by Brandon De-Wilde. The film stars Ke Huy Quan, Eddie Saavedra, Ed Neil, and Jerry Trimble. The film was released on direct-to-VHS in the United States on July 15, 1992.

It is a remake of the 1977 Hong Kong film The Flash Legs starring Tao-liang Tan, who executive produced and wrote this film under the pseudonym Delon Tanners. This was Eddie Saavedra's first and only American film, after which he retired from acting.

== Plot ==
Vietnam vet Michael Moore pulls off a bank heist with his gang, including the bank's manager. To ensure loyalty, a set of keys is made to the hiding place for the loot so it can only be opened if all the members are present. These sets of keys were encrusted in a fake pizza mold that was sliced and given to the gang. The bank manager gets cold feet and tries to back out, but Michael and his henchman kill him and his wife.

The bank manager's daughter Annie gets hold of the key and runs for help to David Moore, her father's old friend and fellow Vietnam vet as well as Michael's brother. David and Michael's two sons, Charlie and Tony, investigate to find out who murdered the girl's parents. During the investigation, a disguised Michael cripples David. Charlie and Tony are nonetheless impressed with David's fighting skills and asks him to train them.

When the investigation leads them to one of Michael's gang members, Tank, a confrontation leads to Tank having a change of heart. Tank helps the brothers gain intel until Michael kills Tank. When David and Charlie learn Michael is the gang leader and the one who killed the bank manager, Michael confronts the two and reveals why he adopted Charlie. In Vietnam, David caught Michael killing Charlie's birth mother and convinced him to adopt the orphaned baby. Shocked, Charlie attempts to reason with Michael. However, Michael's arrogance leads to a showdown between father and son. When Michael is arrested, Tony arrives and blames Charlie. Tony vows to settle the score with Charlie at the national taekwondo tournament.

Both Charlie and Tony make the finals and Charlie refuses to fight Tony. Charlie finally fights back but lets Tony knock him out. Tony wins but regrets it when he sees an unconscious Charlie. Tony helps wake Charlie up and the brothers make amends.

== Cast ==
- Ke Huy Quan (credited as Jonathan Ke Quan) as Charlie Moore
- Eddie Saavedra as Tony Moore
- Ed Neil as David Moore
- Jerry Trimble as Michael Moore
- Bolo Yeung as Thunder
- Wendell C. Whitaker as Tank
- Alan Tackett as Alan
- Jacqueline Pulliam as Jenny
- Laura Hamilton as Annie Stern
- Drake Diamond as Peter Stern
- T. J. Storm as Mickey (as Juan Ojeda)
- Pamela Maxton as Tank's Mother
- Jacqueline Woolsey as Mrs. Stern
- Gary Green as Harry
- Annie Wood as April (as Annie Rubanoff)
- Eugene Trammell as Bank Security Guard

== Production ==
Jason David Frank was considered for the role of Tony but turned it down due to injury. Eddie Saavedra was cast instead. The film is set and was shot at Chino Hills, Redlands and Fontana, California, between February 22 and April 2, 1990, with part of the movie filmed at the home of Executive Producer Peter L. Zang in Bradbury, California.

The idea for the film came from former kung fu star Tan Tao-liang, who used the pseudonym "Delon Tanners". Tan took the idea partly from his 1977 film Shaolin Deadly Kicks, which had a similar premise. Tan also served as executive producer on the film.
