= The Flash Legs =

1977 Hong Kong film by Ma Wu

- Theatrical film poster
- Traditional Chinese: 太極八蛟
- Simplified Chinese: 太极八蛟
- Directed by: Ma Wu
- Written by: Hsiang Kan Chu
- Produced by: Kwan Sin
- Starring: Tao-liang Tan; Lo Lieh
- Cinematography: Wan Wen Liao
- Edited by: Ting Hung Kuo
- Music by: Fu Liang Chou
- Production company: Wha Tai Motion Picture Company
- Release date: 1977
- Running time: 91 minutes
- Country: Hong Kong
- Languages: Cantonese; Mandarin

The Flash Legs (Chinese title: 太極八蛟; Cantonese: Tài Gìk Baat Bo. "The Ultimate Eight Feet"), also released as Shaolin Deadly Kicks, is a 1977 Hong Kong martial arts action film directed by Ma Wu and starring Tao-liang Tan and Lo Lieh. The film was later remade as Breathing Fire, with Tao-liang Tan serving as writer and executive producer under the pseudonym of Delon Tanners.

== Plot ==
A robbery gang known as the Eight Dragons infiltrates a residence to steal a treasure map. Upon its retrieval, when the gang is about to make a getaway, the lights suddenly flick on. They are attacked by the owner of the house (the map is presumably his). The owners of the house are quickly disposed of, and the Dragons make off into the night with the map.

Because of the robbery not being executed as smoothly as planned, the Eight Dragons grow paranoid over seeking the treasure divulged in the map, and decide to hold off until the heat blows over. They divide the map into eight pieces and promise to reunite in three years to collect their fortune.

Not long after the temporary break-up, one of the Dragons (Husky) is arrested in an unrelated robbery as an attempt to cover his extensive tab at a brothel. In jail, he meets Fong Yee (Tao-liang Tan), and together they plan to escape. Another prisoner pickpockets a guard, gets the key, and lets them go.

Soon after their escape, Husky discovers that Yee is an undercover cop going after the Eight Dragons to recover the map. Yee demands the map pieces from Husky and a second member of the Dragons. After they refuse, a fight ensues and Yee's partner is badly injured and later killed. After killing Husky and his co-conspirator in response, Yee recovers two pieces of the map.

One by one, Yee confronts each of the Eight Dragons by posing as a waiter and an art dealer. For the most part, he demands their map pieces and either that they surrender or remain free to live their lives, as he prefers peaceful resolutions. One of the bandits has a sick son and a blind mother. Sadly, the bandits' greed for the treasure results in a fight to the death for a member's piece of the map. Yee is captured by one of the bandits but escapes without the map pieces. He returns the next day, disposes of his captors and recovers his pieces. Unfortunately, he is severely injured in the process.

With a knife embedded in his back, Yee stumbles into the woods until he passes out. He wakes up in the house of a girl named Jade (Doris Lung) whom he previously saved from being assaulted. She nurses him back to health. The recovery process proves slow; Yee not only needs to mend his body, but also regain his kung-fu prowess. Unbeknownst to the two, Jade's father (Wong Hap), who assists in Yee's recovery, is the head of the Eight Dragons, and a final showdown between him and Yee is inevitable. Initially, he figures out who Yee is and contemplates killing him, but after seeing that his daughter is in love with Yee, begins to rethink his role in the treasure hunt. The second in command of the Eight Dragons, Lo Lieh, arrives as the reunion is close, and insists that they kill Yee before he arrests them. The chief says he is dropping out of the operation, refuses to kill Yee and offers his part of the map to be left alone. Despite this, Lieh kills him and takes the piece. Yee and Jade hunt down Lieh to retrieve the map and avenge her father's murder.

== Cast ==
- Tao-liang Tan as Fong Yee
- Lo Lieh as Scarred Dragon, member of The Eight Dragons
- Wong Hap as Chief Dragon
- Doris Lung as Jade
- Kam Kong as Chang Fang
- Lo Dik as Doctor, leader of The Eight Dragons
- Tsai Hung as White eyebrows, member of The Eight Dragons
- Ouyang Sha-fei as Chang Fang's mother
- Lung Fei as member of The Eight Dragons
- Tsang Chiu as Chun-Wei

== Music ==
The film's music was composed by Fu Liang Chou under the name of Chow Fook-Leung. Pieces of John Barry's 1974 score to The Man with the Golden Gun can be heard throughout the film.
