= The Leg Fighters =

1980 Hong Kong film by Lee Tso-nam

- Traditional Chinese: 南北腿王
- Directed by: Lee Tso-Nam
- Written by: Cheung San-Yee
- Produced by: Alan Wu Yu-Ling; Cheng Hau-Wai
- Starring: Tao-liang Tan; Ha Kwong-Li
- Cinematography: Chong Yan-Gin
- Music by: Fu Liang Chou
- Production company: Wa Nam Films
- Release date: 4 June 1980
- Running time: 90 minutes
- Country: Hong Kong
- Languages: Cantonese; Mandarin

The Leg Fighters (Chinese title: 南北腿王), also released as The Invincible Kung Fu Legs, is an independently released 1980 Hong Kong martial arts action film directed by Lee Tso-Nam. Starring Tao-liang Tan and Ha Kwong-Li, it is considered a classic kung fu film.

== Plot ==
After a prologue display of various kicking techniques, Tan Hai-chi (Tao-liang Tan) is confronted by a ground kicking expert that wants to kill him. Tan defeats and spares him, but the man stabs him in the leg and continues the fight, which forces Tan to kill him in self-defense. The mans brother, Peng Fung (Peng Kong) collects his body and vows to take revenge on Tan Hai-chi.

Being raised by her single, wealthy father, Phoenix is the entitled and spoiled daughter of sorts with a chip on her shoulder. To make matters worse, she is enabled by her loyal, troublemaking servant, Chin Pan. She's tasked to learn kung fu from ground-kicking expert, Mo Ku-fung but she despises training and finds every opportunity to avoid it, sabotage it, or display outright disobedience towards her teacher. While Mo Ku-fungs training methods are rather questionable, he tells both Phoenix and Chin that he will leave for good if they can beat him in kung-fu.

Phoenix and Chin display an odd combination of joy and sorrow when their teacher leaves to tend to his sick wife, but before leaving, he recommends his replacement to be none other than Tan Hai-chi. Despite Phoenix's apparent immaturity, she's a good person underneath and takes the opportunity to defend a young girl when she's being physically assaulted in the local town. However, she continues to fight the assailants after they're beaten, and she's asked to show mercy when Tan Hai-chi intervenes. Not knowing that he's her new teacher, she gets in a fight with him, and her inferior skills are of no match for the expert.

When Phoenix and Chin get home, they see that Tan Hai-chi is her new teacher. He is a much stricter and no nonsense-taking teacher than his predecessor, forcing Phoenix to become more literate and seek wisdom. Phoenix transfers her uncooperative disdain to him, once again enabled by her bumbling accomplice. Tan tells Phoenix he will leave her alone for good once she can beat him.

Phoenix's good-hearted nature gets the best of her when she gets mixed up with a village bully named Ding Dong, who is bullying a fortune teller. She defeats him easily, but once he returns to the village with his brother, Dong Dong, they dispatch of the arrogant Phoenix and Chin (while Tan watches in amusement). Tan exploits the situation to humble Phoenix and gets her to acknowledge him as her master. Once she agrees, Tan saves his student from the two bullies and takes her back home. Ding Dong and Dong Dong run back to their master and convince him to challenge Tan Hai-chi. Tan defeats and spares him while Phoenix observes in hiding. In the meantime, Peng Fung is actively looking for Tan to take revenge, he breaks into Mo Ku-fungs home and kills him and his wife when he refuses to tell Peng where Tan Hai-chi is. Peng Fung eventually finds Tan when Ding Dong and Dong Dong tells his henchmen.

Realizing that Tan Hai-chi is the real-deal, Phoenix sincerely agrees to be his dutiful student, bows before her teacher and begins to take her training seriously. While training, she is confronted by Ding Dong, Dong Dong, and Peng's henchman. This time, the much-improved Phoenix handles Ding Dong and Dong Dong with ease and sends them running off in defeat. Peng Fung gets news of this and sends Tan Hai-chi a challenge letter. Tan isn't positive that he can beat Peng Fung and orders Phoenix not to get involved since he can't guarantee her safety.

During the course of the fight, Peng Fung nearly kills Tan with his secret 'nine bird style' until the loyal Phoenix disobeys her master and joins him in fighting Peng Fung to the death.

== Cast ==
- Tao-liang Tan as Tan Hai-chi
- Ha Kwong-Li as Phoenix
- Wang Hsieh as Phoenix's father
- Peng Kong as Feng Fei and Feng Fa
- Sun Jung-Chi as Master Mo Ku-fung

== Reception ==
In 2003, Colin Geddes, a programmer at the Toronto International Film Festival, told the Winnipeg Free Press that the film would be "a treat for the ladies" due to its female protagonist, opining that the film was "unwatchable on video" due to poor cropping of the widescreen image.
