= Tan Tao-liang =

Chinese-South Korean martial artist and former film actor

- Born: Tan Dao-liang; 22 December 1947 (age 78); Busan, South Korea
- Occupations: Martial arts instructor; actor; film producer; screenwriter
- Years active: 1973–91

Chinese name
- Traditional Chinese: 譚道良
- Simplified Chinese: 谭道良
Transcriptions
Yue: Cantonese
- Jyutping: Tan2 Dao4liang2

Tan Tao-liang (Chinese: 譚道良; Tan Dao-liang; born 22 December 1947) is a Chinese-South Korean martial artist and former film actor. He used numerous pseudonyms throughout his career, mostly Delon Tam, Dorian Tan Tao-liang, Tan Tao-liang, Delon Tan, Dorian Tan and Delon Tanner. Noted for his leg holding and hopping skills, Tan was nicknamed "Flash Legs".

In his later life, Tan taught martial arts, notably to John Liu Chung Liang, Yuen Biao, Ke Huy Quan, and Shannon Lee, daughter of Bruce Lee.

== Early life ==
Tan was born on December 22, 1947, in Busan, South Korea. He is a Chinese Korean, aka hwagyo, whose parents fled mainland China after the Second Sino-Japanese War broke out. At age 7, Tan began studying martial arts including taekwondo, judo, hapkido and kung fu. Of these styles, he favored taekwondo as it "allowed full-contact sparring and competition." In an interview, he said he liked high kicks because in taekwondo scoring, a kick to the head is worth two points. Tan won many championships including a world title.

At age 23, Tan began teaching taekwondo at the National Taiwan University. He went on to teach action star John Liu.

== Career ==
In 1973, Tan was noticed by filmmakers and got offered a role in the film The Hero of Chiu Chow. Afterward, he continued to star in action films while spending most of his time teaching martial arts. 1976 was when Tan achieved breakthrough success by starring in John Woo's Hand of Death, which also featured early performances by Jackie Chan, Sammo Hung and Yuen Biao.

After completing Last Breath in 1984, Tan retired from acting and moved to Monterey Park, California, where he opened a taekwondo school in 1987 under the name Delon Tan. He eventually relocated to Taiwan, with his students taking over his studio in Southern California, and later returned to the film industry with the 1991 movie Breathing Fire, serving as executive producer under the pseudonym Delon Tanner. The plot was based on a story he wrote similar to that of his 1977 film The Flash Legs.

In 2006, Tan was arrested in Hong Kong for beating up five staff members at a restaurant, acting drunk and belligerent in disputing the bill.

== Filmography ==
| Year | Film | Role | Notes |
|---|---|---|---|
| 1973 | The Hero of Chiu Chow | | |
| 1974 | Tornado of Pearl River | Tang | Also producer |
| 1975 | Conspiracy of Thieves | | |
| 1976 | The Knife of Devil's Roaring and Soul Missing | | |
| 1976 | Sunset in the Forbidden City | | |
| 1976 | General Stone | Li Cunxiao | |
| 1976 | The Himalayan | Hsu Chin Kang | |
| 1976 | The Hot, the Cool and the Vicious | Captain lu Tung Chun | |
| 1976 | Hand of Death | Yung Fei | |
| 1977 | The Secret of the Shaolin Poles | Chiu Mai | |
| 1977 | Duel with the Devils | Yung Fei | Also producer |
| 1977 | The Shaolin Invincibles | Pai Tai Kung | |
| 1977 | Shaolin Deadly Kicks | Hung Yi | |
| 1977 | The Dragon, the Lizard and the Boxer | Yung Fei | |
| 1977 | Dynasty | Sao Chin Tan | |
| 1978 | Dual Flying Kicks | Su Fang | |
| 1978 | Snake Crane Secret | Chief Escort | |
| 1978 | Showdown at the Cotton Mill | Kao Chin-Chung | |
| 1978 | Challenge of Death | Captain Lu Sao Yung | |
| 1978 | The Tattoo Connection | Dong Ho | |
| 1979 | Revenge of the Shaolin Master | Lin Chen Hu | |
| 1979 | Scorching Sun, Fierce Winds, Wild Fire | Escaped Convict #1 | |
| 1979 | Hero of the Time | Xiong Tianiun | |
| 1979 | Boxer's Adventure | Lee Tak Wai | |
| 1979 | Blooded Treasury Fight | Marshal Chow Kwan Han | |
| 1979 | The Story in Temple Red Lily | Siu Ching | |
| 1980 | The Heroes | Si Ying | |
| 1980 | Mask of Vengeance | | Cameo |
| 1980 | The Eight Escorts | Wu Chin Ping | |
| 1980 | The Revenger | | |
| 1980 | The Invincible Kung Fu Legs | Tan Hai-chi | |
| 1981 | The Kung Fu Emperor | Pai Tang Wa | |
| 1981 | Heroine of Tribulation | | |
| 1981 | Yee Dang Bing Chuk Chap | | |
| 1982 | Godfathers of Fury | Shen Wu | |
| 1983 | Four Wolves | Inspector Shy | |
| 1985 | Last Breath | | Also producer and writer |
| 1991 | Breathing Fire | | Producer and writer |
