= Madame Ke =

Nanny of the Tianqi Emperor (died 1627)

Madame Ke (Chinese: 客氏; pinyin: Kè Shì; c. 1588 – December 1627), was the wet nurse of the Tianqi Emperor (1605–1627), and known for her great influence during his reign as emperor of the Ming dynasty from 1620 to 1627.

== Early life ==
Madame Ke's background is rather vague. Her original full name is Yinyue (印月), but she was a commoner from Dingxing in Baoding. She married a man named Hou Er (d. c. 1608) and had a son named Hou Guoxing and a brother named Ke Guangxian.

== Entry into the Imperial service ==
In 1605, Madame Ke was employed at the imperial court of the Forbidden City at eighteen and became wet nurse to the future Tianqi Emperor after his birth in 1605. Curiously, the appointment of Ke as the wet nurse of the Tianqi Emperor did not follow Ming regulations.

According to historian Ellen Souillere, during the month when the birth of a royal child is expected, wet nurses would be brought to stay in a building west of the Hall of Literary Brilliance, beside the palace moat. If the royal baby was male, a wet nurse who had borne a girl was selected, or if the royal baby was female, a wet nurse who had borne a boy was chosen.

Under Ming regulations, Madame Ke, the mother of a son, should not have been eligible to nurse the future Tianqi Emperor. Also, under Ming regulations, wet nurses were usually procured from areas near Beijing, but Madame Ke was from Dingxing, Hebei. Historians have argued that this unusual appointment showed that the enforcement of Ming regulations was lax, and that appointment to official roles could be subject to manipulations.

The Tianqi Emperor had no contact with his biological mother, Consort Wang (d. 1619), and thus, became completely dependent upon Madame Ke: she was reportedly so close to him that she kept all his baby hair and nail clippings in boxes, while he refused to be pacified at mealtime or at bedtime unless she was there.

Madame Ke was described as an "alluring" beauty, and had close relationships with the eunuchs Wei Chao and, more famously, Wei Zhongxian.

== During the Tianqi Emperor's reign ==
When her charge succeeded to the throne as the Tianqi Emperor at the age of fifteen in 1620, he gave Madame Ke the title of "Lady who supports the Sage" (Fengsheng furen), gave her son and brother imperial privileges as battalion commanders of the Imperial Bodyguard, and appointed Wei Zhongxian to the prestigious office of eunuch custodian of the Imperial brushes at the Directorate of the Ceremonial. Together, Madame Ke and Wei Zhongxian purged the imperial court of their enemies and took control over state affairs in a de facto rule referred to as "Ke-Wei".

As was the custom, Madame Ke moved out of the personal palace of the emperor when he married in 1621, but the emperor had her move back soon afterward, as he could not bear to be apart from her. Madame Ke came to be involved in a conflict with the empress, who attempted to crush the influence of the Ke-Wei regime by accusing Madame Ke of a number of crimes in public and ordered for her to be caned, but before this punishment could be carried out, it was prevented by the emperor.

=== Conflict with the Donglin Faction ===
Given the closeness between Madame Ke and Wei Zhongxian, Ke, too, was a target of Ming officials during Tianqi’s reign. In a petition appealing to the Emperor, Wang Yuncheng, a censor from Nanjing, urged Madame Ke to leave the Forbidden Palace.

Firstly, Wang affirmed the contributions made by Madame Ke, writing that "Considering that Madame Ke had been a nanny for sixteen or seventeen years, I think her loyalty and diligence must have greatly satisfied the emperor's heart"; then justifying his appeal to have Ke leave the Palace, “ since the Emperor had already started a family, "he should cut off his affection for Ke".

In Wang’s words, Madame Ke leaving the palace "was related to whether the state system was respected or desecrated, and whether the emperor's virtue was perfect or tarnished"

In essence, the focus of the court officials' comments on Ke's stay in the palace was not her inadequate care for the Emperor but the over generosity the Tianqi Emperor lavished on his wet nurse. In addition, given that the young Emperor has already established his own family, there was no need for Ke’s continued stay. Thus, for these officials, sending Ke away from the Palace would be good for both the Emperor's and Ke’s reputations, given the prevailing belief that women should not be involved in politics.

Ming officials' criticism of Madame Ke is less focused on her actions but rather on how she has overstepped the boundaries of class and gender. In terms of societal class, Ming scholars believed that the Emperor had overly rewarded a lowly wet nurse. By granting her an official title, the Tianqi Emperor's decisions defied previously established regulations.

In terms of gender, Ke’s continued presence in the palace defies societal rules, where women were not allowed to participate in political affairs. During the Wanli period, a notice was issued to discuss the disadvantages of keeping the "three po(s)" (wet nurses Nai po, doctors Yi Po, and midwives Wen po) in the palace, which illustrates the negative views held towards women like Madame Ke.

The notice writes, "The three Pos are stupid women, not as beautiful and clever as the women who can win the hearts of the people. Emperor Wu of Han and Emperor Xiao of Song ignored these women, and thus achieved great things. Therefore, it is known that it is not necessary to have soldiers to cause chaos in politics, and it is not necessary to have a beautiful woman to change people. The wise can be corrupted by their close associates, and the powerful indulged by the favourite flatterers”.

In 1624, the official Yang Lian attempted to oust the "Ke-Wei"-government by presenting charges against Wei Zhongxian, but his party failed, and the following year saw him and his followers being forced to resign and in some cases imprisoned, tortured and killed on the instigation of Madame Ke and Wei Zhongxian.

=== Influence within the Royal Harem ===
During the reign of the Tianqi Emperor, Empress Zhang and other concubines bore the Emperor three sons and two daughters. None of the children survived to adulthood.

Reportedly, the childlessness of the Emperor was caused by the handiwork of Madame Ke and Wei Zhongxian, who played a significant role in inducing miscarriages among his concubines and consorts. Specifically, they were allegedly the actual cause of the 1623 miscarriage of Empress Zhang, where Madame Ke and Wei solicited the services of a masseur to induce miscarriage when the Empress was having back pains.

Apart from harming the royal children, Madame Ke was also responsible for murdering some of the concubines and consorts on at least two occasions.

One such instance was Consort Yu. During her pregnancy, Yu accidentally offended Madame Ke and Wei. As a result of her offence, Ke and Wei falsely passed on an imperial decree ordering Consort Yu to be imprisoned in her palace, stripped her of her palace maids, and restricted food and drink from entering her palace. As a result, Yu was starved to death in her palace. On another occasion, Ke and Wei were accused of forging imperial decrees during the Taichang Emperor’s reign, where they ordered one of his consorts to commit suicide.

Given Madame Ke's cruelty, the other concubines were deeply afraid of her. For example, Consort Cheng, the mother of Princess Huaining, had to resort to hiding food in the cracks of the palace walls to prevent herself from suffering the fate of Consort Yu. Such caution was not unwarranted, as Yu survived on the food she hid when Madam Ke imprisoned her for half a month.

=== Relationship with the Tianqi Emperor ===
The Tianqi Emperor enjoyed a close relationship with Madame Ke. Dardess describes the relationship between the Emperor and Ke as “warm and familial”, where he described Ke and Wei Zhongxian as functioning as his “personal, parent-like guardians”.

The unusual closeness between the Emperor and Ke could be attributed to his tumultuous childhood. Logically speaking, as the eldest son of Emperor Taichang and the eldest grandson of the Emperor Wanli, there is little to question that the future Tianqi Emperor is the heir apparent since his birth.

However, his father, the future Taichang Emperor, was not favoured by his grandfather, the Wanli Emperor, who wanted to install his younger uncle, Zhu Changxun, as his heir.

Moreover, given the early deaths of the Tianqi Emperor’s parents (the Taichang Emperor only reigned for around a month), it is unsurprising that the young Emperor would be more susceptible to trusting those who were close to him.

== Death ==
On 30 September 1627, the Tianqi Emperor died heirless in Beijing. As a result, his younger brother succeeded as the next emperor of China. Given the close relationship between the dying Tianqi Emperor and his wet nurse, Madame Ke was heavily rewarded in the dying Emperor’s final thoughts. In a public edict, the Tianqi Emperor proclaimed his gratitude towards the care Ke lavished on him, where he recalled how Madame Ke protected him in ways “the outer court cannot imagine” after his parents' deaths.

According to the Emperor, given his sickly constitution as a child, he would not have survived without the unwavering care of Madame Ke. As a result, given Madame Ke’s contributions, he rewarded her for “twenty-three years of total and unwavering loyalty” by promoting honours for her younger brother and her son. Likewise, Madame Ke was greatly grief-stricken following the death of her former charge. Eunuch Memorist Lin Ruoyu records that Madame Ke, in the predawn hours of October 11, went in mourning dress to Tianqi’s coffin in Renzhi palace.

Madame Ke was recorded to have laid and wept beside the coffin as she burned the contents of a small box that contained the dead Emperor’s baby hair, baby teeth and other personal artefacts. For several weeks after the death of the Tianqi Emperor, the newly installed Chongzhen Emperor made no indications that there will be drastic changes in political status enjoyed by Madame Ke and Wei Zhongxian.

On October 8, the new Emperor rejected Wei’s offer of resignation. Following that, on November 11, the Emperor agreed to Wei’s request for the discontinuation of temples built in his [Wei] honour but permitted the construction of previously authorised projects.

Despite the initial amicable attitude shown by the Chongzhen Emperor, the winds were beginning to shift for Madame Ke and Wei. On October 11, Ke vacated her quarters in the Forbidden Palace and moved into her private residence.

On November 30, Lu Chengyuan, a minor official in the Ministry of Works, accused Wei of many acts of insubordination during his service to the Tianqi Emperor, where Wei was accused of overstepping his position as a palace eunuch by allowing himself to be honoured with temples as well as supplanting the regular bureaucracy by sending eunuchs to control the frontiers. Lu’s memorials opened the floodgates for other Wei detractors to impeach and criticise Wei.

On December 8, the Chongzhen Emperor issued an edict outlining Wei’s crimes and exiled him to Fengyang.

With Wei’s fall from grace, so too did Madame Ke. Sometime in December, the Chongzhen Emperor ordered the confiscation of Ke and Wei’s properties. (Zhu Changzuo, p. 123.) According to Lin Ruoyu, Madame Ke, now homeless, moved to the Laundry Bureau, a place for old and disabled palace maids and eunuchs.

Following Madame Ke’s movement to the Laundry Bureau, on December 24, Madame Ke confessed under torture that the eight pregnant palace maids found in her residence had previously accompanied her into the Forbidden Palace.

According to late Ming historian Ji Liuqi, the purpose of bringing the palace maids into the palace was an attempt to usurp the throne by allowing one of the pregnant maids to falsely claim pregnancy. Given the severity of her confession, Madame Ke’s interrogator, a eunuch named Wang Wenzheng, beat her to death. After Madame Ke’s death, her body was cremated in a nearby Buddhist hall and later scattered.

In the months following Madame Ke’s death, the Ministry of Justice presented detailed charges of the crimes against Wei and Madame Ke. Enraged, the Chongzhen Emperor agreed to execute Wei’s nephew and Madame Ke’s son, Hou Guoxing. In addition, the Emperor also ordered both Wei and Madame Ke to be posthumously executed in March 1628.

Given the scattering of Madame Ke’s ashes, this posthumous execution was unable to be carried forward, given that her body was never found.

== Portrayals in the media ==
In 1988, Li Ying portrayed Madame Ke in Bloodshed at Dong Chang

In 1988, Shangguan Yu portrayed Ke in Kwong loong the tyrant

In 1991, Kin Jung-e portrayed Ke in The Demon Wet Nurse.

In 1991, Shen Xiao Li portrayed Ke in Minggongsandaan

In 2005, Ma Yili portrayed Ke in Jinyiwei

In 2007, Song Jia portrayed Ke in Ming Dynasty.

== See also ==
- Lu Lingxuan
