= Hot, Cool, & Vicious =

1976 Hong Kong film by Lee Tso-nam

The Hot, the Cool, & the Vicious
- Directed by: Lee Tso-nam
- Starring: Dorian Tan Tao-liang as Capt Lu; Wong Tao as Pai Yu Ching; Tommy Lee as Mr. Lung; Suen Ga Lam as Ms. Li; George Wang as The Mayor; Phillip Ko as Lung Fong
- Release date: 1976

The Hot, the Cool, & the Vicious is a 1976 kung fu film starring Dorian Tan Tao-liang, Wong Tao, and Tommy Lee.

== Plot ==
Black Stone is a quiet, sleepy town until a mysterious stranger arrives. Secretive of his business, he soon arouses suspicion especially when his identity is revealed as the infamous, troublemaking 'Southern Fist' fighter Pai Yu Ching. Tan Tao Liang plays 'Northern Leg' Captain Lu, the town's sheriff, who finds himself on the opposing side of his boss when the mayor's hot-headed, out-of-control son causes the death of Capt Lu's son-to-be mother-in-law while attempting to sexually assault Capt Lu's fiancé. Capt Lu is steadfast in his resolve to catch this killer, but he has many obstacles in his way, particularly Ms. Li (Suen Ga Lam), the sister of a man who Capt Lu accidentally killed (and wants revenge), and the mayor, who hires Pai Yu Ching to protect his house from any would-be lawmen that might try to arrest his son. The mayor has other reasons for keeping Capt Lu at arm's length as he is deeply involved in a counterfeiting ring. Pai Yu Ching is actually a secret government official, who is investigating the mayor's counterfeit money activities and uses the "guard dog" at the mayor's residence as an opportunity to conduct his investigation. In the beginning, he is often in staring contests with Capt Lu, and fights with him at the mayor's residence on one occasion, only to protect his cover. When Ms. Li attempts to hire Pai Yu Ching to kill Capt Lu, he initially accepts her offer, at a hefty price, but later turns it down since it is not his intention to harm Capt Lu, and he eventually seeks Capt Lu's help after his partner is killed by the hotel's owner (who is secretly in cahoots with the mayor).

Although the mayor fires Capt Lu from his post, Capt Lu eventually tracks down the mayor's son with help from a tip provided by Pai Yu Ching. This distraction also gives Pai Yu Ching the opportunity to search the mayor's house and confiscate any evidence of counterfeiting. On the way to arrest the mayor's son, Capt Lu is confronted by Ms. Li, who can't defeat the superior skilled Capt Lu, but when he offers her the opportunity to take her revenge, she turns it down and lets him go. With his son in custody and the counterfeiting seal missing, the mayor receives a surprise visit from his co-conspirator, the strange Mr. Lung (Tommy Lee). Mr. Lung is a kind of pale-skinned, albino looking individual with a slight hunchback, that speaks in an echoed voice and walks with a limp. He is, however, extremely proficient at mantis kung fu. Mr. Lung helps the mayor capture Capt Lu and Pai Yu Ching and demands that they return the seal that makes the counterfeit currency. Ms. Li joins up with Capt Lu's fiancé and his police subordinates to rescue him and Pai Yu Ching and they kill the mayor and his hotel-owning accomplice. Capt Lu and Pai Yu Ching then hunt down Mr. Lung for a final showdown.

== Cast ==
- Dorian Tan Tao-liang as Capt Lu
- Wong Tao as Pai Yu Ching
- Tommy Lee as Mr. Lung
- Suen Ga Lam as Ms. Li
- George Wang as The Mayor
- Phillip Ko as Lung Fong
