= Scorching Sun, Fierce Winds, Wild Fire =

1979 film by Sheng-Yuan Sun

- Traditional Chinese: 烈日狂風野火
- Simplified Chinese: 烈日狂风野火
Transcriptions
Standard Mandarin
- Hanyu Pinyin: Liè Rì Kuáng Fēng Yě Huǒ
Yue: Cantonese
- Jyutping: Lit^{6} Jat^{6} Kong^{4} Fung^{1} Je^{5} Fo^{2}

Scorching Sun, Fierce Winds, Wild Fire's original film poster

Scorching Sun, Fierce Winds, Wild Fire (traditional Chinese: 烈日狂風野火; simplified Chinese: 烈日狂风野火), also released as Any Which Way You Punch and Dragon Connection, is a 1978 Taiwanese kung fu film starring Angela Mao, Dorian Tan, Chang Yi, and Lo Lieh.

== Plot ==
Scorching Sun, Fierce Wind, Wild Fire is a story about a search for the second half of a treasure map, but it's conveniently forgotten at various points. Angela Mao plays the daughter of a warlord and has a secret identity as the masked freedom fighter Violet, who rides the country righting wrongs and organizing rebels. Tien Peng plays a mysterious stranger who comes to town looking for the other half of the map. Lo Lieh and Tan Tao Liang play prison inmates who escape and end up actually being ex-comrades with Tien Ping and assisting he and Violet in apprehending Master Wu (Chang Yi), the security chief who does most of the fighting for the warlord. Master Wu turns traitor in order to get the map.

== Cast ==
- Angela Mao as Violet
- Dorian Tan as Escaped Convict #1
- Lo Lieh as Escaped Convict #2
- Chang Yi as Master Wu

== Music ==
In the American dubbed version, during the opening scene as well as throughout the entire film, John Williams's score from Star Wars can be heard.

== Reception ==
The French title of the film is La Belle aux mains de fer. The film was reviewed in the French film magazines Cinéma, Écran, and La Revue du cinéma. The film was covered in the Hong Kong film magazine Cinemart in August 1977.
