= Song Jia (actress, born 1962) =

Chinese actress (born 1962)

- Born: 1962 (age 63–64); China
- Other names: Da Song Jia
- Occupation: Actress

Song Jia (Chinese: 宋佳; pinyin: Sòng Jiā; born in 1962) is a Chinese actress. She is today also known colloquially as Da Song Jia (大宋佳, literally: "Song Jia the older", to distinguish from the younger actress of the same name. As a young actress she herself appeared on the cover of Dazhong Dianying in June 1990. She played Lady Zhao in the 2001 TV series Qin Shi Huang. She also played play Cao Hui (曹慧) in CCTV's Deng Xiaoping biopic.

== Filmography ==
- Ming Dynasty (2007)
- Kung Fu Angels (2014)

== Awards ==
- Hundred Flowers Award for Best Actress for Conservatory Garden Very Deeply (zh:庭院深深)
- Hundred Flowers Award for Best Actress for Amid the Howling Wind (zh:落山風)
