= Together We Stand =

- Genre: Sitcom
- Created by: Al Burton; Michael Jacobs; Sherwood Schwartz
- Written by: Stephen Sustarsic
- Directed by: Peter Bonerz; Andrew D. Weyman
- Starring: Dee Wallace; Elliott Gould; Scott Grimes; Ke Huy Quan; Julia Migenes; Natasha Bobo; Katie O'Neill
- Country of origin: United States
- Original language: English
- No. of seasons: 1
- No. of episodes: 19 (6 unaired)

Production
- Executive producers: Sherwood Schwartz; Al Burton
- Running time: 30 minutes
- Production companies: Al Burton Productions; The Sherwood Schwartz Company; Universal Television

Original release
- Network: CBS
- Release: September 22, 1986 – April 24, 1987

Together We Stand, also known as Nothing Is Easy, is an American sitcom that aired on CBS from September 22, 1986 to April 24, 1987. It was written by Stephen Sustarsic and directed by Andrew D. Weyman.

Together We Stand is about a married couple, David (Elliott Gould) and Lori Randall (Dee Wallace), and their array of adopted children from all walks of life. According to producer Sherwood Schwartz, the plot for this show was originally written as a spin-off of The Brady Bunch called Kelly's Kids. In the January 4, 1974, episode of The Brady Bunch, also titled "Kelly's Kids" (season 5, episode 14), which served as a backdoor pilot, the Bradys' neighbors plan to adopt one child but end up adopting three boys of different ethnicities. Together We Stand is an American sitcom that aired on CBS from September 22, 1986, to April 24, 1987. Created by Al Burton, Michael Jacobs, and Sherwood Schwartz, the series starred Elliott Gould and Dee Wallace as a married couple raising a family that includes two adopted children of different ethnic backgrounds.Engstrom, John. "Together We Stand/Nothing Is Easy". TV Obscurities. The concept originated from a 1974 The Brady Bunch backdoor pilot episode titled "Kelly's Kids", which Schwartz had produced but was never picked up as a series.

After a special preview on September 22 drew a 17.1 rating, the series settled into its regular Wednesday 8:00 PM slot on October 1, where it dropped to a 10.0 rating. In mid-October, CBS announced that Gould would not be returning and his character would be killed off. The series was retooled and returned in January 1987 under the title Nothing Is Easy, with Wallace continuing as a single mother and Julia Migenes joining the cast as a new character. Despite multiple time slot changes, the show averaged an 11.7 rating for the season, ranking 66th out of 83 programs, and was cancelled with six episodes left unaired.

== Summary ==
David Randall (Elliott Gould) and his wife Lori (Dee Wallace) had two kids, adopted daughter Amy (Katie O'Neill) and biological son Jack (Scott Grimes). After seeing how well the Randall family did with an adopted child and a biological child, a pushy social worker (Edie McClurg) gives them two more children: an Asian-American boy named Sam (Ke Huy Quan) and a little African-American girl named Sally (Natasha Bobo). The story lines centered on the cultural differences and adjustments that had to be made by all: Sam and Sally having parents for the first time, and Jack and Amy competing with the new arrivals for their parents' time and affection. After six episodes, Gould's character was killed off, and the series focused on Lori's struggles as a single mother.

== Cast ==
- Elliott Gould as David Randall (in Together We Stand only)
- Dee Wallace as Lori Randall
- Scott Grimes as Jack Randall
- Katie O'Neill as Amy Randall
- Ke Huy Quan as Sam Randall
- Natasha Bobo as Sally Randall
- Julia Migenes as Marion Simmons (in Nothing Is Easy only)

== Episodes ==
=== Together We Stand (1986) ===
No. overall	No. in season	Title	Directed by	Written by	Original release date	Prod. code
1	1	"Pilot"	Will Mackenzie	Michael Jacobs	September 22, 1986	83527
2	2	"Oh, Brother!"	Will Mackenzie	Michael Jacobs	September 29, 1986	62402
3	3	"It Happened One Night"	Will Mackenzie	T : Michael Jacobs; S : Mark Miller	October 1, 1986	62413
4	4	"Betrothal"	Will Mackenzie	Sam Greenbaum	October 8, 1986	62412
5	5	"Socks and Bonds"	Will Mackenzie	Michael Jacobs	October 15, 1986	62411
6	6	"A Chicken in Every Wok"	Will Mackenzie	Mark Miller	October 29, 1986	62404

=== Nothing Is Easy (1987) ===
No. overall	No. in season	Title	Directed by	Written by	Original release date	Prod. code
7	1	"We're a Family"	Michael Zinberg	T : Paul Haggis; S : Pat Shea & Harriet Weiss	February 8, 1987	62429
8	2	"I Never Dance with Mother"	Andrew D. Weyman	David Lerner	February 15, 1987	62431
9	3	"A Kiss Is Just a Kiss"	Jack Shea	Unknown	March 27, 1987	62435
10	4	"Double Date"	Joan Darling	Unknown	April 3, 1987	62433
11	5	"Mother, Can You Spare a Dime?"	Andrew D. Weyman	Unknown	April 10, 1987	62436
12	6	"That's What Friends Are For?"	John Bowab	Unknown	April 17, 1987	62434
13	7	"Sunday, Monday and Always"	Peter Bonerz	Unknown	April 24, 1987	62427
14	8	"Girls Night In"	Will Mckenzie	Dennis Rinsler & Marc Warren	N/A	62405
15	9	"Little Miracle"	Alan Bergmann	TBD	N/A	62417
16	10	"Jack's Alter Ego"	Dolores Farraro	TBD	N/A	62419
17	11	"Against All Odds"	Lee Miller	Cindy Begel & Lesa Kite	N/A	62420
18	12	"Love Is in the Air"	Herbert Kenwith	Michael Jacobs	N/A	62422
19	13	"My Mentor"	Lee Miller	Dennis Rinsler & Marc Warren	N/A	62424

== Network run ==
Premiering on Monday, September 22, 1986, at 8:30 PM ET after Kate & Allie where its ratings were initially strong, Together We Stand moved to Wednesdays at 8:00 PM ET beginning on October 1 to make room for My Sister Sam, putting it up against ABC's Perfect Strangers and NBC's Highway to Heaven instead. When the show's ratings plunged, CBS pulled the series after six episodes had aired.

The show returned three months later with a new title – Nothing Is Easy – new opening credits, a new time slot (Sundays at 9:30 PM ET, after Designing Women and up against movies on the other two networks), a new theme song, and a new cast member – Julia Migenes as bitter divorced neighbor Marion Simmons. Elliott Gould did not appear in the revamped series – his character was killed off in an automobile accident, and Dee Wallace-Stone continued on as a single mother. After two weeks in that time slot, it went on hiatus again for a month only to resurface on Fridays at 8:00 PM beginning on March 27, competing with ABC's The Charmings and NBC's Roomies. The revamp lasted only for a total of seven episodes before CBS cancelled it for good. The remaining six unaired episodes are not known to have aired anywhere.

== Awards ==
Year	Award	Category	Nominee(s)	Results
1986	Young Artist Awards	Exceptional New Family Television Comedy or Drama Series – Fall 1986 Season	Together We Stand	Nominated
1986	Young Artist Awards	Exceptional Performance by a Young Actor in a New Television Comedy or Drama Series	Ke Huy Quan	Won
1986	Young Artist Awards	Exceptional Performance by a Young Actor in a New Television Comedy or Drama Series	Scott Grimes	Nominated
1986	Young Artist Awards	Exceptional Performance by a Young Actress in a New Television Comedy or Drama Series	Natasha Bobo; Katie O'Neill	Nominated
1987	Young Artist Awards	Exceptional Performance by a Young Actor in a Television Comedy Series	Scott Grimes	Nominated
1987	Young Artist Awards	Best Young Actress Under 10 Years of Age in Television or Motion Picture	Natasha Bobo	Nominated
