= Wei Zhongxian =

Chinese eunuch (1568–1627)

- Born: 1568; Suning County, Ming Empire
- Died: 12 December 1627 (aged 58–59) south of Beijing, China
- Occupation: court eunuch

Wei Zhongxian
- Traditional Chinese: 魏忠賢
- Simplified Chinese: 魏忠贤
Transcriptions
Standard Mandarin
- Hanyu Pinyin: Wèi Zhōngxián
- Wade–Giles: Wei Chung-hsien

Wei Si
- Traditional Chinese: 魏四
- Simplified Chinese: 魏四
Transcriptions
Standard Mandarin
- Hanyu Pinyin: Wèi Sì
- Wade–Giles: Wei Ssu

Li Jinzhong
- Traditional Chinese: 李進忠
- Simplified Chinese: 李进忠
Transcriptions
Standard Mandarin
- Hanyu Pinyin: Lǐ Jìnzhōng
- Wade–Giles: Li Chin-chung

Wei Zhongxian (1568 – December 12, 1627), born Wei Si (魏四), was a Chinese court eunuch who lived in the late Ming dynasty. As a eunuch he used the name Li Jinzhong (李進忠). He is considered by most historians as the most notorious eunuch in Chinese history. He is best known for his service in the court of the Tianqi Emperor Zhu Youjiao (r. 1620–1627), when his power eventually appeared to rival that of the emperor.

During his tenure, Zhu Youjiao was uninterested in court affairs, leaving room for Wei to abuse his power to issue edicts to promote and demote hundreds of officers. Mao Wenlong was one of the generals promoted by Wei Zhongxian. During Zhu Youjiao's reign, Wei would send the emperor's edicts to the Embroidered Uniform Guard led by prison director Xu Xianchun to purge corrupt officials and political enemies. Xu then arrested and demoted hundreds of officials and scholars from the Donglin movement, including Zhou Zongjian, Zhou Shunchang, and Yang Lian.

When Zhu Youjian rose to power, he received complaints about Wei and Xu's actions. Zhu Youjian then ordered the Embroidered Uniform Guard to arrest Wei Zhongxian. Wei then committed suicide by hanging himself from a beam on the roadside of the capital before he could face the inquisition. Zhu then punished 161 officials and executed 24 of Wei's associates. Madam Ke, who was also close to Wei, was beaten to death. Many people denounced the incident, with the Chinese public writing stories dramatizing the event. Eventually, the Ming dynasty was destroyed and overturned by the Qing dynasty, and the Qing armies purged and persecuted the Zhu emperors and their families.

== Early life (1568–1585) ==
Little is known of Wei's pre-court life. Wei was illiterate throughout his life, which may be an indication that he was born into a peasant or merchant class family. He is presumed to have been born in 1568 in Suning County (100 miles southeast of Beijing), to have married a girl with the surname of Fang (方), and to have castrated himself at age 21 (Ming dynastic records claim that he did so in order to escape his gambling debts). Due to his fame in Chinese culture over the past 400 years, other stories of his early life have appeared, many showing him as a ruffian and a compulsive gambler.

== Early court life (1585–1619) ==
Through a relative of his mother, Wei was able to enter into service in the Forbidden City. After he became an imperial eunuch, he used the name Li Jinzhong. As a eunuch in the Ming court, Wei slowly gained the favor of various palace officials while working in various unofficial positions. In 1605, he was given the job of serving meals to Lady Wang and her infant son Zhu Youjiao, who would eventually become the Tianqi Emperor. While serving in this position, he grew close to Zhu Youjiao's wet nurse, Madame Ke. As Zhu Youjiao grew older, he became extremely attached to both Madame Ke and Wei Zhongxian, treating them as his de facto parents when his mother died in 1619.

== Political rise (1620–1624) ==
When the Wanli Emperor and his heir, the Taichang Emperor, both died in 1620, the palace bureaucracy was thrown into a succession crisis. The death of the Taichang Emperor brought Madame Ke, Wei Zhongxian, and Zhu Youjiao under the supervision of Lady Li, the Taichang Emperor's consort. Zhu hated Lady Li. Donglin activist Yang Lian also did not want Lady Li in power, not wanting China to fall under the temporary rule of a regent (Zhu Youxiao was still 15 and underaged). Thus, Yang Lian invaded the Forbidden City, captured Zhu Youxiao, and had him proclaimed emperor in his own right. With Lady Li deposed, it became much easier for Wei and Madame Ke to influence the imperial court's decisions.

Soon after Zhu Youxiao was enthroned as the Tianqi Emperor, it became clear that he was much more interested in carpentry and building projects than in court matters; he often left such matters to Wei, who was then promoted to be the Brush-Holding Eunuch of the Directorate of Ceremonial (Sili Jian Bingbi Taijian), and the Grand Secretaries. Wei's loyalty to the Tianqi Emperor paid quick dividends – by 1625, he had become the minister of the Eastern Depot, a force of over one thousand uniformed policemen headquartered in the Forbidden City. As the Tianqi Emperor's de facto father and protector, Wei eventually became responsible for delivering imperial edicts, and any order from the palace was issued in the name of the emperor as well as Wei, the "Depot Minister". Fourteen of Wei's relatives were either ennobled or received hereditary military positions; some were even appointed to high official positions. As fear of Wei's power became more and more prevalent in China, many local officials commissioned the building of temples in his honor, much to the chagrin of Confucian scholars.

== Donglin incidents (1624–1627) ==
After the Wanli Emperor's (1563–1620) long and underwhelming reign, the Donglin faction of activist scholars had hoped that the Taichang and Tianqi emperors would prove to be "Confucian gentlemen". When the Tianqi Emperor proved just as indifferent to his imperial responsibilities as his grandfather was and an illiterate eunuch seemed to be the most powerful figure in the Forbidden City, the Donglin scholars decided that their intervention was sorely needed. Donglin sympathizer and Ming censor Zhou Zongjian impeached Wei Zhongxian in July 1622, imploring the emperor to remove him from the palace. In 1624, Yang Lian wrote a memorial to Tianqi condemning Wei of "24 crimes", some of them fabricated. Both attempts were unsuccessful and turned Wei against the Donglin party.

As head of the Eastern Depot, Wei's power to arrest and convict dissidents was technically confined to peasants and merchants. Arrests and interrogations of officials had to be done through the Embroidered Uniform Guard, who were under command of prison director Xu Xianchun. However, Wei's true power came through his commission to deliver the emperor's edicts, as well as his close relationship with the emperor. In 1625, Xu then arrested six of the Donglin party's leaders, including Yang Lian (Wei's detractor), whom he had accused of squandering public money through their bureaucracy positions. Xu then subjected Yang and the other five Donglin leaders to lengthy interrogations and torture. Eventually all six died, apparently without imperial edict. Xu then arrested seven other Donglin scholars, including Zhou Zongjian, and killed them in 1626. Over the two-year period of 1625–26, hundreds of other presumed Donglin sympathizers were demoted or purged from the government by Xu and the Embroidered Uniform Guard. Although Wei's exact involvement in these arrests and killings is not known, his overall control of the palace and the emperor's powers of edict ensured his involvement in some degree.

== Fall from power and suicide (late 1627) ==
The Tianqi Emperor died in 1627, and although many expected Wei to attempt to seize the throne, no such coup happened. According to Li Sunzhi (a Donglin sympathizer), Wei had previously attempted to convince Empress Zhang to adopt his nephew, Wei Liangqing, in order to continue his manipulation of the throne. However, the empress refused. Because none of the Tianqi Emperor's three sons lived to adulthood, the emperor conferred the right to rule to his younger brother, Zhu Youjian, who became the Chongzhen Emperor on 2 October 1627.

Although the Chongzhen Emperor was intent on ruling without any decision-making surrogates, he did not immediately dismiss Wei. When Wei offered to resign just six days after the Chongzhen Emperor's reign began, the emperor refused. A month later, Wei decreed that no more temples should be built in his honor. In the months afterwards, multiple complaints about and calls for Wei's impeachment came before the emperor. After ignoring the first few, the Chongzhen Emperor finally called for evidence of Wei's faults from officials. In response to this, "more than one hundred" officials sent memorials denouncing Wei. On December 8, the Chongzhen Emperor issued an edict listing Wei's crimes and exiled him south to Fengyang (in present-day Anhui).

As Wei traveled to Fengyang, one of the Chongzhen Emperor's commissioners warned the emperor that Wei might work with other demoted officials of the deceased Tianqi Emperor to stage a rebellion. Acting on the warning, the Chongzhen Emperor ordered the Embroidered Uniform Guard to arrest Wei and bring him back to Beijing. On December 13, informants found Wei and told him of the edict. That night, he and his entourage stopped at an inn 150 miles south of Beijing. Wei and his secretary proceeded to hang themselves from the rafters with their own belts. After discovering Wei's death, the rest of his entourage managed to escape the area before the guards came.

The Chongzhen Emperor's retribution to Wei and his political allies was swift and severe. In early 1628, Wei's corpse was dismembered and displayed in his native village as a warning to the public. By 1629, 161 of Wei's associates had been punished by the Chongzhen Emperor; of those, 24 were sentenced to execution. Madam Ke was beaten to death by an interrogator just 11 days after Wei's death.

== Legacy and dramatizations ==
Since his death, Wei has been seen by Chinese people and scholars as an instigator of Zhu Youjiao's abuse of power and collective atrocities. According to historical Chinese scholars, Wei's faults lay not necessarily in his persecution of the Donglin party, but in wielding power that was only supposed to be used by emperors themselves. Stories and dramatizations of this persecution were written just months after his death and gained a large public audience. In 2009, a 42-hour primetime television series dramatizing Wei Zhongxian and Madam Ke's power during the reign of the Tianqi Emperor was shown on Chinese television. The series also portrayed Wei Zhongxian and Zhu Youjiao in a negative light.

== See also ==
- Temple of Azure Clouds in modern Beijing: largely expanded by Wei, who intended to use it as his burial grounds.
- Mao Wenlong, a general promoted by Wei
