= Empress Zhang (Tianqi) =

Empress of China from 1621 to 1627

Empress Yi'an 懿安皇后

Empress consort of the Ming dynasty
- Tenure: 1621–30 September 1627
- Predecessor: Empress Xiaoduanxian
- Successor: Empress Xiaojielie
- Born: 1606; Xiangfu County, Henan (present-day Kaifeng, Henan, China)
- Died: 24 April 1644 (aged 37–38)
- Burial: De Mausoleum
- Spouse: Tianqi Emperor (m. 1621; died 1627)
- Issue: Zhu Ciran, Crown Prince Huaichong
Regnal name
- Empress Yi'an (懿安皇后)
Posthumous name
- Empress Xiao'ai Cijing Gonghui Wenzhen Xietian Xiesheng Zhe (孝哀慈靖恭惠溫貞偕天協聖悊皇后)
- Clan: Zhang (張)
- Father: Zhang Guoji, Marquis of Taikang (太康侯 張國紀)

Empress Yi'an (1606–1644), of the Zhang clan, was the empress consort of the Tianqi Emperor of the Chinese Ming dynasty.

== Empress ==
Empress Zhang was selected to be the primary spouse and empress of the emperor in 1621. Her original name is not known, nor is that of her mother. Her father was Zhang Guoji (張國紀), who was elevated to the position of Bo (count) of Taikang when she became empress.

Empress Zhang, though young, was described as calm and straightforward to her behavior, and strict but fair in palace affairs. The Tianqi Emperor, who has been described as badly educated and possibly mentally deficient, was deeply dependent upon the wet nurse Madame Ke and the eunuch Wei Zhongxian, and Empress Zhang is known to have opposed their influence. She reportedly informed the Emperor about the misdeeds of his two favorites, but he always refused to take action against them. In one incident, she subtly compared Wei Zhongxian to the eunuch Zhao Gao, who was blamed for bringing about the end of the Qin dynasty. On one occasion, she had Madame Ke summoned and ordered for her to be caned, but the emperor appeared and stopped the punishment from being executed.

Wei Zhongxian reportedly induced miscarriages among the consorts and concubines of the emperor, while Madame Ke is said to have caused the deaths of some of the women themselves. Empress Zhang herself became pregnant in 1623, but her pregnancy ended in a miscarriage, which was reportedly caused by a plot between Madame Ke and some of the palace women.

Wei Zhongxian and Madame Ke could not attack Empress Zhang personally, but they attempted to cause her downfall by accusing her father of piracy, thereby indirectly pointing her out as the daughter of a criminal and therefore not suitable as Empress, undermining her position. The plot failed as it was opposed by court officials.

== Later life ==
In 1627, the Tianqi Emperor died without issue, all the pregnancies of his consorts and concubines having ended in miscarriages or deaths in infancy. In the unclear succession crisis, Wei Zhongxian attempted to usurp the throne by a plot in which he convinced some palace women to falsely claim pregnancy, a pregnancy he would have a male accomplice made true. Empress Zhang thwarted the plot by securing the throne for the brother of the late emperor instead. In recognition for this help, the new emperor awarded her the title Empress Yi'an.

In April 1644, the army of the rebel Li Zicheng were approaching the capital through Juyong Pass. On 23 April, the Chongzhen Emperor held his last audience with his ministers. Li Zicheng offered Chongzhen the opportunity to surrender, but the emperor refused. The following day, the rebel army attacked the capital. The Chongzhen Emperor ordered the crown prince and his two brothers to hide in the home of relatives, and summoned the rest of his family. Rather than to let them be captured by the rebels, the emperor started to kill the female members of his family, concubines and consorts. Using his sword, he killed Honored Consort Yuan and Princess Kunyi, and severed the arm of Princess Changping, before dressing himself as a eunuch and trying to escape himself. Empress Zhou was ordered by the emperor to commit suicide, which she performed by hanging, while Empress Zhang Baozhu committed suicide by strangulation.

== Titles ==
- During the reign of the Wanli Emperor (r. 1572–1620):
  - Lady Zhang (張氏; from 1606)
- During the reign of the Tianqi Emperor (r. 1620–1627):
  - Empress (皇后; from February 1621)
- During the reign of the Chongzhen Emperor (r. 1627–1644)
  - Empress Yi'an (懿安皇后; from 1627)
- During the reign of the Hongguang Emperor (r. 1644–1645)
  - Empress Xiao'ai Cijing Gonghui Wenzhen Xietian Xiesheng Zhe (孝哀慈靖恭惠溫貞偕天協聖悊皇后; from 1644)

== Issue ==
- As empress:
  - Zhu Ciran, Crown Prince Huaichong (懷衝皇太子 朱慈燃; 4 November 1623), the Tianqi Emperor's first son

== Notes ==
- Lily Xiao Hong Lee, Sue Wiles: Biographical Dictionary of Chinese Women, Volume II: Tang Through Ming 618 - 1644

Chinese royalty
Preceded by Empress Xiaoduanxian	Empress consort of China; 1621–1627	Succeeded by Empress Xiaojielie
