= Deliberative Council of Princes and Ministers =

Advisory body during the Qing dynasty

The Deliberative Council of Princes and Ministers (traditional Chinese: 議政王大臣會議; simplified Chinese: 议政王大臣会议; pinyin: Yìzhèng Wáng Dàchén Huìyì), also known as the Council of Princes and High Officials and Assembly of Princes and High Officials, or simply as the Deliberative Council (traditional Chinese: 議政處; simplified Chinese: 议政处; pinyin: Yìzhèng Chù; Manchu: ᡥᡝᠪᡝ ᡳ
ᠪᠠ, romanized: hebe-i ba), was an advisory body for the emperors of the early Qing dynasty (1644–1912). Derived from informal deliberative groups created by Nurhaci (1559–1626) in the 1610s and early 1620s, the Council was formally established by his son and successor Hong Taiji (1592–1643) in 1626 and expanded in 1637. Staffed mainly by Manchu dignitaries, this aristocratic institution served as the chief source of advice on military matters for Hong Taiji and the Shunzhi (r. 1643–1661) and Kangxi (r. 1661–1722) emperors. It was particularly powerful during the regencies of Dorgon (1643–1650) and Oboi (1661–1669), who used it to enhance their personal influence.

After serving as the most influential policymaking body of the dynasty for more than a century, the Deliberative Council was displaced and then made obsolete by the more ethnically mixed Grand Council, which the Yongzheng Emperor (r. 1722–1735) created in the late 1720s to circumvent the influence of the deliberative princes and ministers. The Deliberative Council was formally abolished in 1792.

== Origins and formal establishment ==
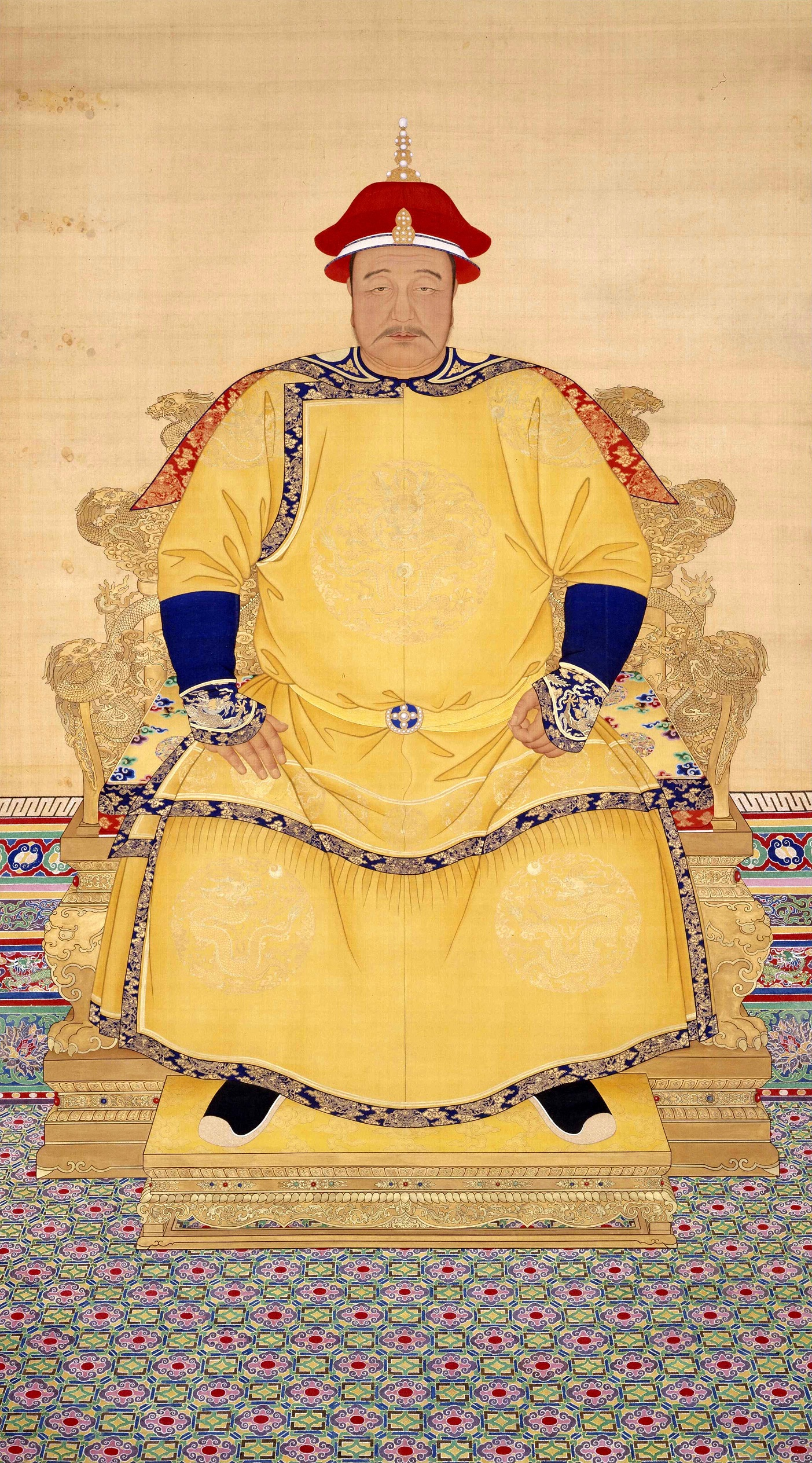
Hong Taiji, seen here in imperial regalia, formally established the Council of Deliberative Ministers in 1627.

Historian Robert Oxnam has called the origin of the Council "a complicated and often confusing process." The Council originated in informal institutions created by Nurhaci (1559–1626) to promote collegial rule among his sons. In 1601, Nurhaci had organized Manchu society into four "Banners" that were doubled in number in 1615 to become the Eight Banners. In 1622, he gave eight of his sons (who were called "princes," or beile) control over one banner each and ordered them to meet to deliberate major policies, especially military matters. Nurhaci's eight sons were known collectively as the "princes who deliberate on government" (議政王 yìzhèng wáng; Manchu: doro jafaha beise).

Another precursor to the Council was a group of "five high officials" and "ten judges" (jarguci), all Manchu, that Nurhaci put in charge of administrative and judicial tasks in 1615 or 1616. Robert Oxnam claims that this group was then referred to as "high officials who deliberate on government" (議政大臣 yìzhèng dàchén; Manchu: hebe-i amban) and assisted the princes in discussing policy. Franz Michael, however, claims that they were mere "technical advisors", a point of view supported by Silas Wu. In 1623, "eight high officials" were also made deliberative officials, but their functions were chiefly censorial and their primary role was to let Nurhaci know of conspiracies among the princes.

Nurhaci was succeeded by his son Hong Taiji (r. 1626–1643), who, instead of following his father's wish for collegial rule, became a strong ruler who laid the institutional foundation of the Qing dynasty. In 1627 he placed the Eight Banners under the command of eight "high officials" (Ma.: gusai ejen; Ch.: dachen), who were also told to assist the princes in policy deliberations. Silas Wu identifies this reform as the bona fide origin of the Deliberative Council, which then became Hong Taiji's main policymaking structure and was consulted on foreign and military matters. In 1637, one year after he had declared himself emperor of the new found Qing dynasty, Hong Taiji officially excluded imperial princes from the Council. Instead, the Council was manned by eight lieutenant-generals (later called dutong 都統 in Chinese) with two deputies (fu dutong 副都統) each, who were put in charge of managing the Eight Manchu Banners. By limiting Council membership to Manchu military leaders from outside the imperial Aisin Gioro clan, Hung Taiji enhanced his personal power at the expense of the other princes. Nonetheless the Council remained a bastion of "collective aristocratic rule" within the Qing government.

== Central role in the early Qing ==
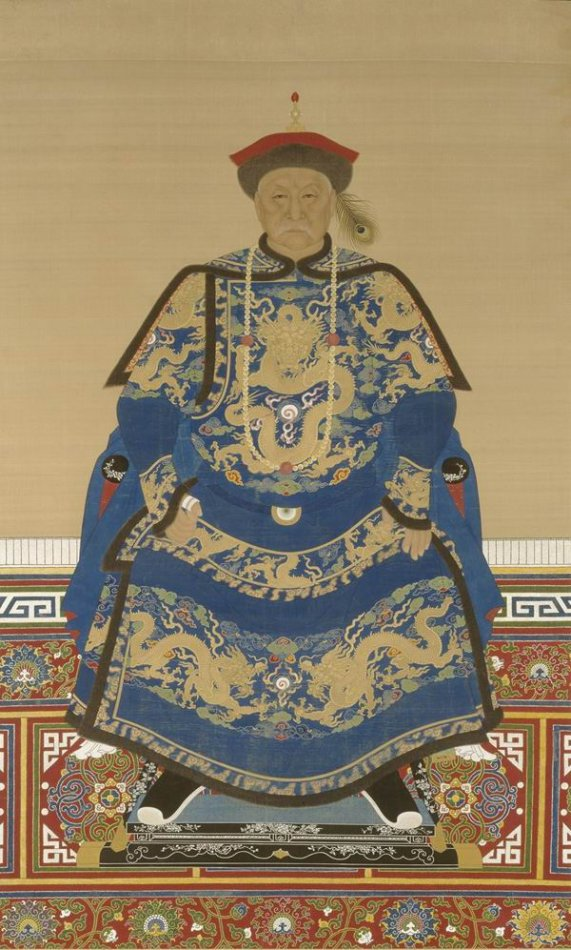
Oboi used the Deliberative Council as his main policymaking tool from 1661 to 1669 during his co-regency for the Kangxi Emperor.

When Hong Taiji died in 1643, he was replaced by the young Shunzhi Emperor and two co-regents: Dorgon and Jirgalang. In 1644, under their leadership, the Qing dynasty replaced the collapsed Ming dynasty and moved its capital to Beijing. The Deliberative Council of Ministers was Dorgon's main policymaking body during his regency. Soon after moving to Beijing, he gave the Council control over both military and civil affairs, and expanded its membership to all lieutenant-generals and deputy lieutenant-generals in the Manchu and Mongol Banners, as well as to all Mongols and Manchus who held posts of Grand Secretary or Board president. Far from limiting Dorgon's power, the Council served as his tool to denounce and arraign other princes who challenged his authority. In May 1644, for instance, he had Hong Taiji's son Hooge accused of seditious behavior and made Hooge's enemies testify against him in front of the Council. He used the same method to purge Hooge for good in 1648.

After Dorgon's death on the last day of 1650, the Shunzhi Emperor started his personal rule: he ordered the members of the Council to memorialize to him directly on important matters of state. After Dorgon's supporters had been purged from the court (by March 1651), his former co-regent Jirgalang made a number of special appointments to the Council to foster loyalty among the Manchu elite. Between 1651 and 1653, he added thirty new members who lacked official positions in the Banners or the metropolitan bureaucracy. Two of the new appointees were Chinese Bannermen Fan Wencheng (范文程, 1597–1666) and Ning Wanwo (寗完我, d. 1665), two of only three Chinese who were ever appointed to the Council. All four of the future regents for the Kangxi Emperor (Oboi, Suksaha, Ebilun, and Soni) were also appointed to the Council at that time. In 1656, the emperor issued an edict abolishing the automatic appointment to the Council of Manchu and Mongol Grand Secretaries, yet by the end of his reign in 1661, the Council still counted more than fifty members. During the Shunzhi reign, the Council was often convened to investigate important officials who had been accused of corruption or malfeasance.

The Shunzhi Emperor (r. 1643–1661) was succeeded by four regents led by Oboi, who took care of state affairs during the minority of the Kangxi Emperor (r. 1661–1722). Under the Oboi regency (1661–1669), the Deliberative Council became "the most prominent Manchu institution." While keeping their own seats on the Council, the regents limited membership to lieutenant-generals of the Manchu and Mongol Banners and to Manchu and Mongol presidents of the Six Ministries. They also decided to grant membership to the president of the Court of Colonial Affairs, whose independence the Shunzhi Emperor had compromised by subjugating it to the Board of Rites. By 1662, the Deliberative Council had been reduced to 31 members, chiefly senior Manchu leaders who had significant experience in both military affairs and civil government.

The Kangxi Emperor reverted many of the bureaucratic reforms of the Oboi faction after 1669, but continued to rely on the Deliberative Council as a body of Manchu counselors whom he consulted on a wide variety of military and civil matters, especially those that were too sensitive or complex to handle through the regular bureaucracy. The emperor allowed the president of the Censorate to sit on the Council, then in 1683, after the rebellion of the Three Feudatories had been suppressed and peace reestablished, he decided that the lieutenant-generals of the Banners would no longer be automatic members. After that, the Deliberative Council became more oriented toward civil administration. Nonetheless during the First Oirat–Manchu War, fought from 1687 to 1697 between the Qing Empire and the Dzungar Khanate, the Kangxi Emperor often consulted the Council on how to deal with Galdan, the khan of the Dzungars, and with the Dzungars' enemies the Khalkha Mongols. During his reign, the Council met on imperial request and transmitted the result of its deliberations to the emperor, who usually followed the Council's advice.

== Replacement by the Grand Council ==
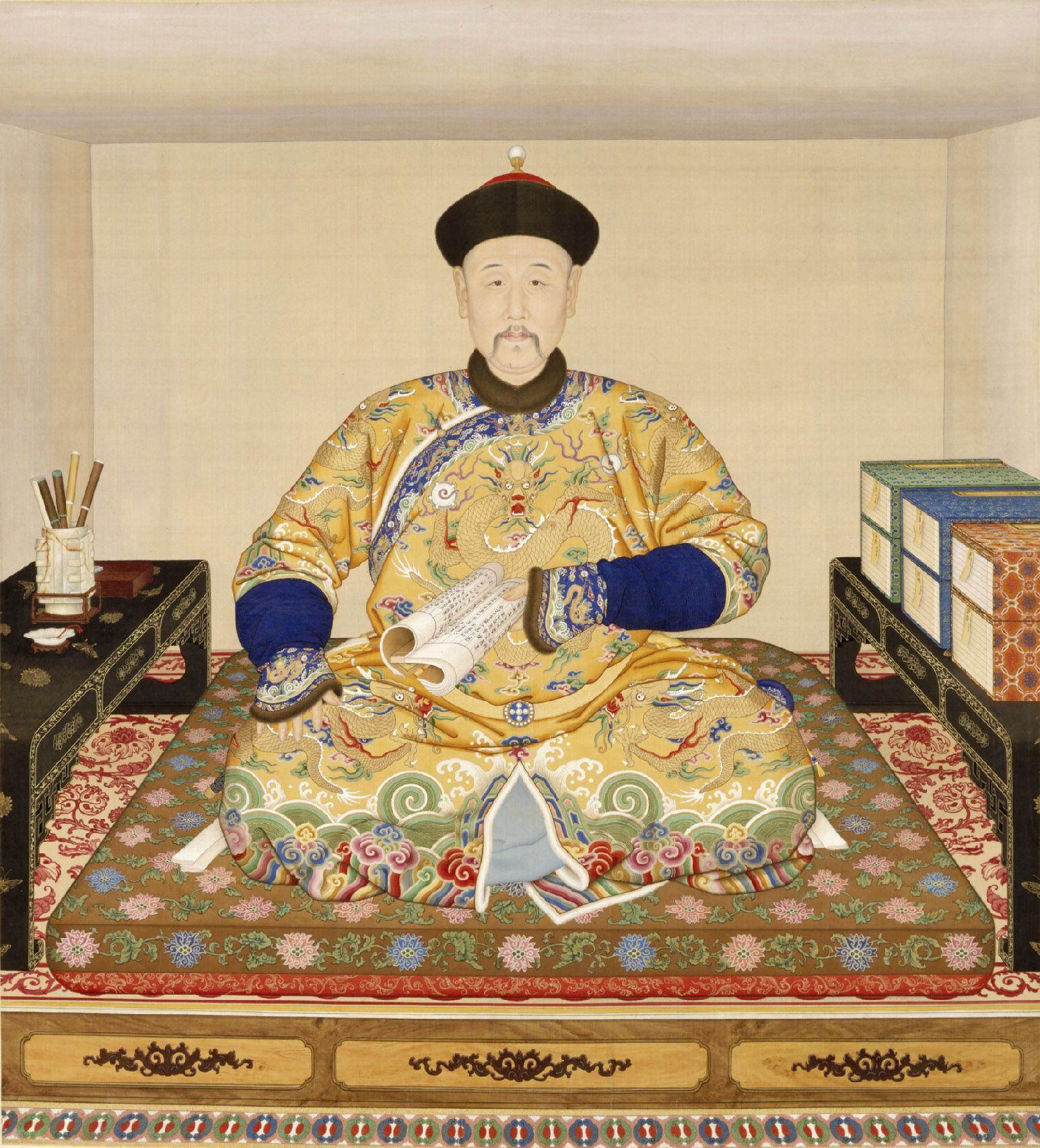
To diminish the influence of Manchu nobles, the Yongzheng Emperor created the Grand Council, a new deliberative body that bypassed the Deliberative Council.

The Yongzheng Emperor succeeded the Kangxi Emperor after a crisis that pitted many of the Kangxi Emperor's sons against one another. Many Manchu nobles who had sided with the Yongzheng Emperor's rivals during the succession struggle were still members of the Deliberative Council. To avoid alienating these grandees, the Yongzheng Emperor still made new appointments to the Council and consulted it on various military matters, but he also worked to undermine its power. To bypass the Council, he created smaller parallel bodies which he found more reliable and less entrenched. Slowly, he transferred deliberative powers to these more trusted ministers. Around 1730, these informal institutions crystallized into the Grand Council. Unlike the Deliberative Council, whose membership was almost exclusively Manchu, the Grand Council counted many Chinese among its ranks. This more ethnically mixed privy council served as the empire's main policymaking body for the rest of the Qing dynasty.

After the stabilization of the Grand Council in the 1730s, the influence of the Deliberative Council quickly declined. During the Qianlong period (1736–1796), the titles of "deliberative minister" and "deliberative prince" became mainly honorific. Manchu Grand Secretaries held such titles until 1792, when the Council was formally abolished by the Qianlong Emperor. The title was revived in the second half of the nineteenth century for Prince Gong and others when Prince Gong was head of the Grand Council.

== Bibliography ==
- Bartlett, Beatrice S. (1991), Monarchs and Ministers: The Grand Council in Mid-Ch'ing China, 1723–1820, Berkeley and Los Angeles: University of California Press, ISBN 978-0-520-08645-6.
- Hucker, Charles O. (1985), A Dictionary of Official Titles in Imperial China, Stanford: Stanford University Press, ISBN 978-0-8047-1193-7.
- Kessler, Lawrence (1976), K'ang-Hsi and the Consolidation of Ch'ing Rule, 1661–1684, Chicago: University of Chicago Press, ISBN 978-0-226-43203-8.
- Michael, Franz (1942), The Origin of Manchu Rule in China: Frontier and Bureaucracy as Interacting Forces in the Chinese Empire, Baltimore: Johns Hopkins Press.
- Oxnam, Robert B. (1975), Ruling from Horseback: Manchu Politics in the Oboi Regency, 1661–1669, Chicago and London: University of Chicago Press, ISBN 978-0-226-64244-4.
- Perdue, Peter C. (2005), China Marches West: The Qing Conquest of Central Eurasia, Cambridge, Mass., and London, England: The Belknap Press of Harvard University Press, ISBN 0-674-01684-X.
- Rawski, Evelyn S. (1998), The Last Emperors: A Social History of Qing Imperial Institutions, Los Angeles and Berkeley: University of California Press, ISBN 978-0-674-12761-6.
- Wu, Silas H. L. (1970), Communication and Imperial Control in China: Evolution of the Palace Memorial System, 1693–1735, Cambridge: Harvard University Press, ISBN 978-0-674-14801-7.
- Wakeman, Frederic Jr. (1985), The Great Enterprise: The Manchu Reconstruction of Imperial Order in Seventeenth-Century China, Berkeley and Los Angeles: University of California Press, ISBN 978-0-520-04804-1.
