= Oboi =

Regent of China from 1661 to 1669

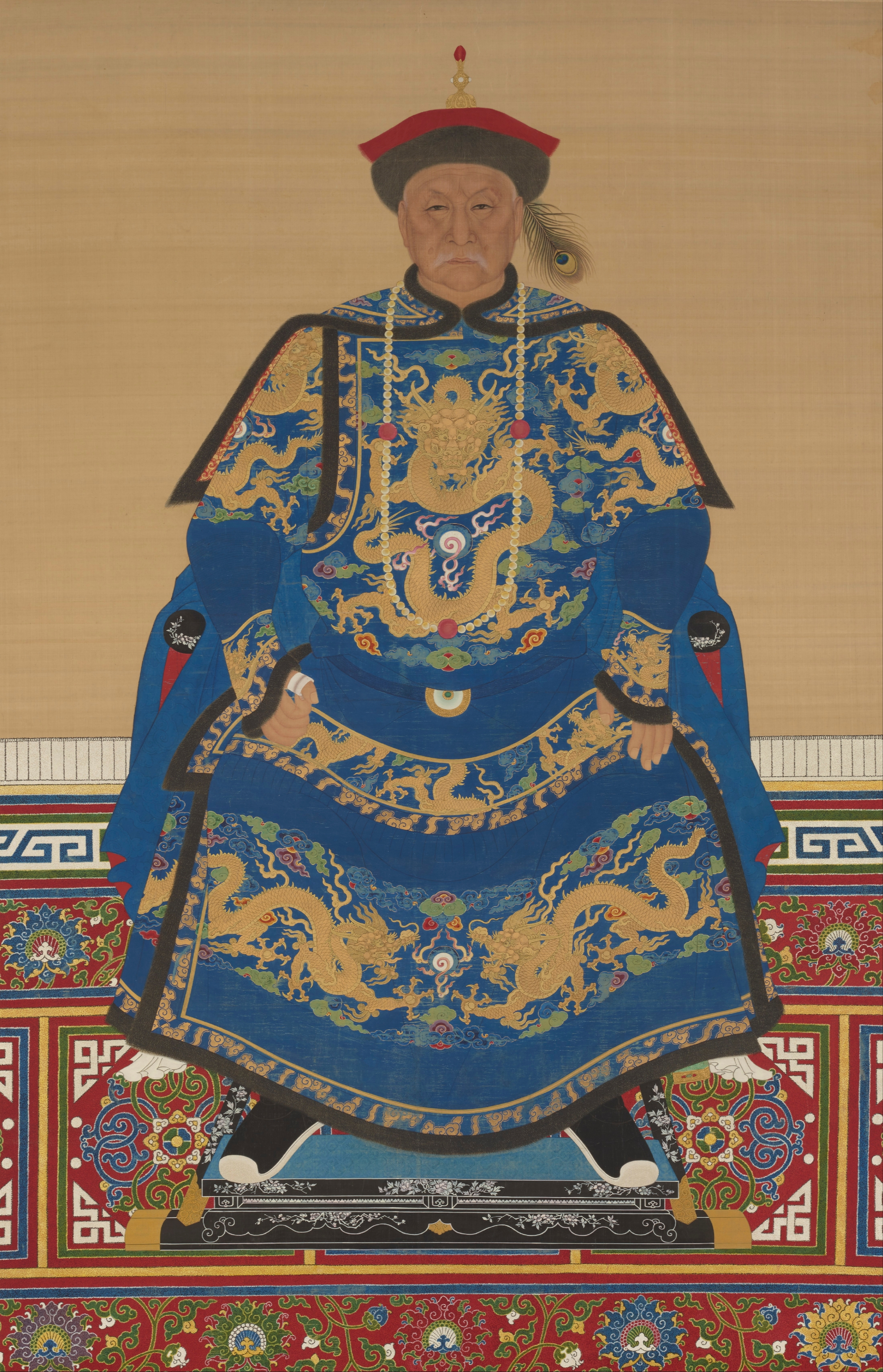
- Portrait of Oboi

Regent of the Qing dynasty
- In office 5 February 1661 – 27 June 1669 Serving with Sonin, Ebilun, Suksaha
- Monarch: Kangxi Emperor

Personal details
- Born: 1610
- Died: 27 June 1669 (aged 58–59)
- Parent: Uici (father)
- Relatives: Fiongdon (uncle)
- Cabinet: Four Regents of the Kangxi Emperor
- Clan name: Gūwalgiya
- Posthumous name: Chaowu (超武)

Military service
- Allegiance: Qing dynasty
- Branch/service: Manchu Bordered Yellow Banner
- Years of service: 1637-1646
- Battles/wars: Chahar Mongols pacification; Qing invasion of Joseon; Battle of Song-Jin; Transition from Ming to Qing

Oboi (Manchu: ᠣᠪᠣᡳ, Mölendorff: Oboi; traditional Chinese: 鰲拜 or 鄂拜; simplified Chinese: 鳌拜; pinyin: Áobài; Jyutping: Ngou4 Baai3) (1610 – 27 June 1669) was a prominent Manchu military commander and courtier who served in various military and administrative posts under three successive emperors of the early Qing dynasty. Born to the Guwalgiya clan, Oboi was one of four regents nominated by the Shunzhi Emperor to oversee the government during the minority of the Kangxi Emperor. Oboi reversed the benevolent policies of the Shunzhi Emperor, and vigorously pushed for clear reassertion of Manchu power over the Han Chinese. Eventually deposed and imprisoned by the new emperor for having amassed too much power, he was posthumously rehabilitated.

== Early life and military career ==
Oboi was born to the Manchu Gūwalgiya clan, which had been distinguishing itself militarily since Oboi's grandfather Solgo submitted to Nurhaci (1559–1626) in 1588. Under the Manchu Banner organization created by Nurhaci, Oboi's branch of the family was registered under the Bordered Yellow Banner which came under the command of Nurhaci's son Hong Taiji (1592–1643). Oboi's father Uici (衛齊) (d. 1634) was a senior military officer who was once garrison commander of the Manchu capital city Mukden while his paternal uncle Fiongdon was one of Nurhaci's most trusted generals.

Oboi's childhood and early years are relatively obscure. Being his father's third son, he was not destined to inherit the family's hereditary position in the Banner hierarchy. Oboi was first mentioned in official Qing history in the Veritable Records of Qing Taizong [Hong Taiji] (清太宗實錄) in 1632, documenting his triumphant return from a minor raid into Ming territories in which he was allowed to keep his spoils as reward.

Oboi officially started his military career in 1634 during the reign of Hong Taiji as a junior officer in the Banner's cavalry guard unit in which capacity he distinguished himself many times in battle against Ming forces and was renowned for his personal bravery. For this, he was granted a hereditary commission as captain of a company (niru i janggin). In 1633 and 1634 he took part in campaigns against the Chahar Mongols, whose leader Ligdan Khan submitted to the Manchus in 1635.

In 1637 during the Manchu's second campaign against Korea, Oboi volunteered and succeeded in capturing the small but strategically important Ka Island (then known as "Pidao" in Chinese) south of the Yalu River, from which the Ming army had led operations against the Liaodong peninsula, the main focus of armed conflict between the Manchus and the Ming. After a difficult amphibious landing followed by desperate hand-to-hand combat the defending Ming garrison was annihilated. For this achievement he was promoted to the rank of a hereditary colonel third-class and bestowed the rare honorific title of "Baturu" (巴圖魯), which means "(brave) warrior" in Manchu. In 1641, Oboi again distinguished himself in battle scoring five victories in as many encounters in the consecutive sieges of Jinzhou and Songshan, two of the last Ming strongholds in Liaodong. He was promoted to full colonel and given command of the Bayarai guards of the Bordered Yellow Banner.

After the death of Hong Taiji in 1643, Oboi supported the late ruler's eldest son Hooge over Dorgon during the ensuing succession crisis. Despite Hooge's faction losing out to Dorgon's proposed compromised candidate, Hong Taiji's youngest son Fulin, Oboi continued to participate in military campaigns through the Qing dynasty's successful invasion of China in 1644. His rise in the Bordered Yellow Banner hierarchy continued apace with the Qing conquest of the Ming. In 1645 he was promoted to the rank of general. From 1644 to 1648 Oboi was part of the armies that fought bandit and self declared emperor Li Zicheng (nemesis of the last Ming emperor), bandit king Zhang Xianzhong, and the remnants of Zhang's armies after Zhang was killed in 1647. Draft History of Qing claims that in early 1647 during the campaign to pacify Sichuan, Oboi was responsible for slaying Zhang in battle. However other Qing records show an entirely different account, one where one of Zhang's commanders, Liu Jinzhong defected to the Qing after fearing being the next victim of Zhang's ongoing purge and execution of his own commanders and soldiers, leading the Qing soldiers and Haoge directly to Zhang Xianzhong's camp where Zhang was alerted to their presence and decided to confront them with only 8 to 10 men. Zhang was shot and killed by an anonymous archer from the Qing army after Liu identified Zhang to the Qing troops. Oboi is nowhere mentioned in this other account as being responsible for Zhang Xianzhong's death nor was Zhang beheaded in this account.

In 1648, when Hooge was imprisoned and convicted by Dorgon, Oboi was sentenced to death, but his sentence was commuted to loss of rank. Despite his demotion, in 1648 and 1649 he took part in a campaign to extirpate Ming turncoat Jiang Xiang (姜瓖; d. 1649)––who had now turned against the Qing––from his base in Datong (Shaanxi, north China).

== Persecution and rehabilitation ==
As a member of the Bordered Yellow Banner, Oboi's loyalty to his Banner master was crucial to his rapid advancement during the years when Hong Taiji commanded the Banner. However, after Hong Taiji's death, Oboi's loyalty to his new Banner master Hooge became a political liability. When Dorgon who commanded the White and Bordered White Banners became regent to the young Shunzhi Emperor, he sought to weaken the influence of the other Banners at court by purging the ranks of their senior commanders. Just as Hooge was arrested and eventually died in prison, in 1648 Oboi was stripped of his rank and titles under a charge of claiming false victories in battle. Later he was found guilty of a more serious crime of conspiracy to elect Hooge as emperor during the succession dispute after Hong Taiji's death. This later charge carried with it the death penalty, however the sentence was commuted while he continued to command troops against Ming loyalists. The charges against Oboi were most likely politically motivated and were rehabilitated in 1651 after Dorgon's death. Oboi for his unswerving loyalty to his Banner and services to the Qing government was appointed a cabinet minister by Shunzhi Emperor, who also bestowed on him the title of Marquis of the First Rank.

The extent of the Shunzhi Emperor's trust in Oboi's loyalty can be gauged by the honours the emperor showered on him. In 1652 after Shunzhi successfully purged the court of the more powerful elements in Dorgon's faction, Oboi was elevated to a hereditary Duke of the Second Rank and more importantly appointed the commander of the imperial bodyguard (領侍衛內大臣), a job which doubled as the de facto police chief in the capital. In this capacity Oboi acted as Shunzhi's much feared enforcer against Dorgon's old cohorts and helped to consolidate power to the throne and the Emperor's own "Upper Three Banners". During the period of Shunzhi's personal rule, Oboi was responsible for the arrest and execution of a number of noblemen found guilty of one crime or another. Although there is no doubt that these executions were carried out with the approval of Shunzhi, it is not surprising that after the emperor's death, Oboi, given his ruthless character and position in court, when left uncontrolled by a higher authority would eventually come to dominate court politics creating a deep state centered on himself.

== Regency ==
The Shunzhi Emperor died from smallpox on February 5, 1661, at the age of 24. On his deathbed he appointed four "Executive Ministers" (輔政大臣) commonly referred to as regents to "assist" his eight-year-old son Xuanye to govern the country until the young emperor reached the age of maturity at 16. The four ministers in their order of seniority were Sonin of the Yellow Banner, who apart from being chief minister of the Imperial Household Department (內務府大臣) was also nominated by Empress Dowager Zhaosheng to head the regency. The second minister on the list was Suksaha of the White Banner. Originally a trusted deputy of Dorgon, Suksaha was politically astute enough to switch sides immediately after the former regent's death when the court was still dominated by Dorgon's associates. By the time of the Shunzhi Emperor's death he was one of the emperor's most trusted courtiers. Then came Ebilun and Oboi, both members of the Bordered Yellow Banner. The Shunzhi Emperor's succession plan set a precedent for the Qing dynasty of nominating courtiers who owed their loyalty to the crown to "assist" a young emperor during the years of minority in running the state. This reflected the lesson learned from Dorgon's regency, when the regent grew almost too powerful for the emperor to control. Unfortunately, this system of appointing ministers to oversee the government during an emperor's minority proved not to be a very stable political device after all.

Three of the four ministers, Sonin, Ebilun and Oboi were members of the "Two Yellow Banners" (i.e. Yellow Banner and Bordered Yellow Banner) previously under the command of the Shunzhi Emperor's elder brother Hooge. Because of the personal and political rivalries between Hooge and Dorgon, all three men were persecuted at one time or another during Dorgon's regency for their Banner affiliation. However their loyalty thus proven was also key to their rapid advancement after Dorgon's death. It was a major factor in Shunzhi's choice of personnel to oversee his son's regency. However Shunzhi's arrangement heightened the already sensitive relationship between the three members of the Yellow Banners and Suksaha who belonged to the White Banner. Suksaha was a much despised figure at this point not only because he was a member of the White Banner in an imperial court dominated by the two Yellow Banners, but also because he gained the Shunzhi Emperor's trust by denouncing his former master Dorgon, an action seen by his colleagues including members of the White Banner as disloyal.

In the first years of the regency, the tension between the Yellow Banners faction and Suksaha was kept in check by the even handed Sonin and thus the four ministers maintained a relatively peaceful and efficient working relationship. But the dynamics of the regency began to change as Sonin's health deteriorated due to old age. As Sonin gradually took more time off, Oboi monopolized decision making by dominating the indecisive Ebilun and worked to sideline Suksaha during policy discussions especially on issues concerning welfare of the Manchu Eight Banners. By 1667 when Sonin realized he did not have long to live, he tried a last-ditch effort to restore balance to the regency and neutralize Oboi's rapidly expanding power clique by petitioning the then 14-year-old Kangxi Emperor to assume personal rule ahead of schedule. Thus Kangxi formerly took over the reins of power in an ascension ceremony on August 25, 1667, a month after Sonin's death. This was followed by an official decree technically downgrading the three remaining ministers to the status of "advisers" (佐政大臣) while still remaining at their posts. However even with the formal authority of office, the young Kangxi Emperor found it difficult to curb the growing power of Oboi.

== Conflict with the Kangxi Emperor ==
Oboi forced the young Kangxi Emperor to execute Suksaha and his family. He controlled Ebilun completely and then finally established a system of near absolute rule under himself.

The Kangxi Emperor took power earlier than expected at the age of 15 in 1669. The emperor suddenly had Oboi arrested on 30 charges. Oboi was sentenced to death but it was reduced to imprisonment in consideration of his achievements. Some sources say that he displayed the many wounds on his body that had been received in the defense of Kangxi's great-grandfather Nurhaci, this act had apparently moved the Kangxi Emperor to pardon Oboi.

Oboi was posthumously rehabilitated. The Kangxi Emperor issued a pardon in 1713, while his successor, the Yongzheng Emperor, granted Oboi the rank of a First Class Duke and the posthumous title Chaowu (超武 "exceedingly martial") but Yongzheng's successor, the Qianlong Emperor, gave Oboi the lower title of First Class Baron after reviewing his merits and demerits.

== In popular culture ==
Oboi appears as an antagonist in the early part of the wuxia novel The Deer and the Cauldron by Jin Yong. In the novel, he is depicted as a cruel, power-hungry regent plotting to usurp the throne from the Kangxi Emperor. With help from the protagonist Wei Xiaobao, the emperor manages to remove Oboi from power and imprison him. Oboi is eventually killed in prison by Wei Xiaobao.

In the 2017 Chinese TV series Legend of Dragon Pearl Oboi is portrayed by Xiao Rongsheng. Oboi is shown to be an oppressive roadblock for the Kangxi Emperor in his mission regain his full political power and reaffirm his sovereignty.
