= Prince Chun (created 1674) =

Prince Chun of the First Rank

Chinese name
- Traditional Chinese: 和碩純親王
- Simplified Chinese: 和硕纯亲王
Transcriptions
Standard Mandarin
- Hanyu Pinyin: héshuò chún qīnwáng
- Wade–Giles: ho-shuo ch'un ch'in-wang

Manchu name
- Manchu script: ᡥᠣᡧᠣᡳ ᡤᡠᠯᡠ ᠴᡳᠨ ᠸᠠᠩ
- Romanization: hošoi gulu cin wang

Prince Chun of the First Rank, or simply Prince Chun, was the title of a princely peerage used in China during the Manchu-led Qing dynasty (1644–1912). As the Prince Chun peerage was not awarded "iron-cap" status, this meant that each successive bearer of the title would normally start off with a title downgraded by one rank vis-à-vis that held by his predecessor. However, the title would generally not be downgraded to any lower than a feng'en fuguo gong except under special circumstances.

The first bearer of the title was Lunghi (1660–1679), the Shunzhi Emperor's seventh son. In 1674, Lunghi was granted the title "Prince Chun of the First Rank" by his third brother, the Kangxi Emperor. After Lunghi's death, the title was passed on to his infant son, Fu'erhulun (1679–1681), who died prematurely. The peerage thus ended with Fu'erhulun's death.

== Members of the Prince Chun peerage ==
- Lunghi (隆禧; 1660–1679), the Shunzhi Emperor's seventh son, held the title Prince Chun of the First Rank from 1674 to 1679, posthumously honoured as Prince Chunjing of the First Rank (純靖親王)
  - Fu'erhulun (富爾祜倫; 1679–1681), Lunghi's son, held the title Prince Chun of the First Rank from 1679 to 1681, died prematurely and had no heir

== See also ==
- Royal and noble ranks of the Qing dynasty
