= Lunghi (prince) =

- Prince Chun of the First Rank 和碩純親王

Head of the House of Prince Chun peerage
- Tenure: 1674 – 1679
- Predecessor: peerage created
- Successor: Fu'erhulun
- Born: 30 May 1660
- Died: 20 August 1679 (aged 19)
- Spouse: Lady Šanggya
- Issue: Fu'erhulun
Names
- Lunghi (隆禧)
Posthumous name
- Prince Chunjing of the First Rank (純靖親王)
- House: Aisin-Gioro
- Father: Shunzhi Emperor
- Mother: Lady Niu

Lunghi (Manchu: ᠯᡠᠩᡥᡳ, Chinese: 隆禧; 30 May 1660 – 20 August 1679) was the Shunzhi Emperor's seventh son. He was the first holder of Prince Chun of the First Rank title from 1674 to 1679. As the peerage was not granted iron-cap status, his successors would hold diminished ranks.

== Life ==
Lunghi was born to lady Niu (钮氏). As Qing dynasty rulers haven't still developed rank system for imperial consorts, his mother was ranked as a mistress (庶妃).

Lunghi's father died shortly after his birth. At that time of Shunzhi Emperor's funeral, his mother was promoted to the position of secondary consort (侧妃). In 1674, Lunghi was granted the title Prince Chun of the First Rank. Lunghi was appointed as the fourth rank military official in the following year. Lunghi died in 1679. His half brother, Kangxi Emperor, cancelled court sessions for 3 days and attended the funeral because Grand Empress Dowager Zhaosheng was unable to attend the ceremony.

Lunghi was posthumously honoured as Prince Chunjing of the First Rank (純靖親王, meaning "pure and tranquil"). He was succeeded by the sole son, Fu'erhulun. Fu'erhulun died prematurely in 1681 at the age of 2, leaving the peerage extinct.

=== Posthumous adoptions ===
Kangxi Emperor had the intent to adopt his 7th surviving son Yunyou as Lunghi's heir and successor. As posthumous adoptions were prohibited by the actual law, Kangxi Emperor created a title of Prince Chun of the Second Rank which included character 'chun' with Kangxi radical 86 ('water').

== Family ==
Lunghi was married to Lady Shang, first daughter of Shang Zhilong, a son of Shang Kexi and prince consort of Princess Heshun of the Second Rank, adopted as Shunzhi Emperor's daughter.

- Primary consort, of the Shang clan (嫡福晋 尚氏)
  纯亲王嫡福晋-->纯靖亲王嫡福晋
  - Fu'erhulun (富尔祜伦; 30 December 1679 – 15 January 1681)

== Tomb of Prince Chun ==
The tomb of Lunghi is located west from the tomb of Prince Yuxian of the First Rank, Fuquan. The garden surrounding the tomb is shared with the garden of Prince Yuxian. A fountain in the side pavilion is decorated with white jadeite crabs, Ao turtles and shrimps.
