= Four Regents of the Kangxi Emperor =

Regents of China from 1661 to 1669

The Four Regents of the Kangxi Emperor were nominated by the Shunzhi Emperor to oversee the government of the Qing dynasty during the early reign of the Kangxi Emperor before he came of age. The four were Sonin, Ebilun, Suksaha, and Oboi.

== Background ==
The Shunzhi Emperor died in 1661 and was succeeded by his six-year-old son, who was enthroned as the Kangxi Emperor. Before the Shunzhi Emperor died, he appointed four interior ministers – Sonin, Suksaha, Ebilun and Oboi – to assist the Kangxi Emperor as regents. This period of regency in the Qing dynasty was known as the "Four Regents period". The Kangxi Emperor only took full control of the government in May 1669.

== Early regency ==
In the initial stage of the regency, the four regents oversaw the government together and provided assistance towards each other in accordance with the Shunzhi Emperor's dying wishes. They continued the war against resistance forces loyal to the Ming dynasty (the dynasty before the Qing dynasty). In April 1662, the last ruler of the Southern Ming dynasty, the Yongli Emperor, was killed by Wu Sangui on the orders of the four regents. Within the next two years the Qing government had suppressed all anti-Qing armed forces within China. The Qing dynasty then moved on to a stable development phase as the society and economy had been badly devastated by war. The four regents devised policies to aid in the recovery and development of China.

== End of the regency ==
During the early years of the regency, tension between the two Yellow Banners faction and Suksaha was kept in check by Sonin, and the four regents managed to maintain a relatively peaceful and efficient working relationship. However the dynamics of the regency began shifting as Sonin's health gradually deteriorated due to old age. As Sonin took more time off to recuperate, Oboi started monopolising state power by making decisions without consulting the other regents (taking advantage of Ebilun's indecisiveness) and sidelining Suksaha during discussions, especially on issues concerning the welfare of the Eight Banners.

By 1667, when Sonin realised that he did not have long to live, he attempted to restore balance to the regency and neutralise Oboi's rapidly expanding power clique. He wrote a memorial to the 14-year-old Kangxi Emperor, requesting that the emperor assume personal rule ahead of schedule. The Kangxi Emperor thus formally took over the reins of power in a ceremony on August 25, a month after Sonin's death. Following this, Kangxi issued an imperial decree to reduce the power of the three surviving regents, stating that their roles had been reduced to that of assisting ministers (佐政大臣). However even after officially taking full control of the government, the Kangxi Emperor found it difficult to curb Oboi's growing influence.

In 1669, with help from Grand Empress Dowager Xiaozhuang, the Kangxi Emperor had Oboi arrested and stripped off his position of power. Since then, the Kangxi Emperor began taking personal control of the government. Ebilun was dismissed from office and Oboi's clique disbanded. This marked the end of the Four Regents period.

== Sources ==
- Bennet Peterson, Barbara (2000). Notable Women of China: Shang Dynasty to the Early Twentieth Century. M.E. Sharpe, Inc.
