= Fiongdon =

Manchu name
- Manchu script: ᡶᡳᡠᠩᡩᠣᠨ
- Möllendorff: fiongdon

Chinese name
- Chinese: 费英东
Transcriptions
Standard Mandarin
- Hanyu Pinyin: fèi yīng dōng

Pronunciation respelling name
- Pronunciation respelling: FEE-ohng-Dung

Fiongdon (1564 – 10 April 1620), was a Manchu official and one of the earliest companions of Nurhaci.

== Biography ==
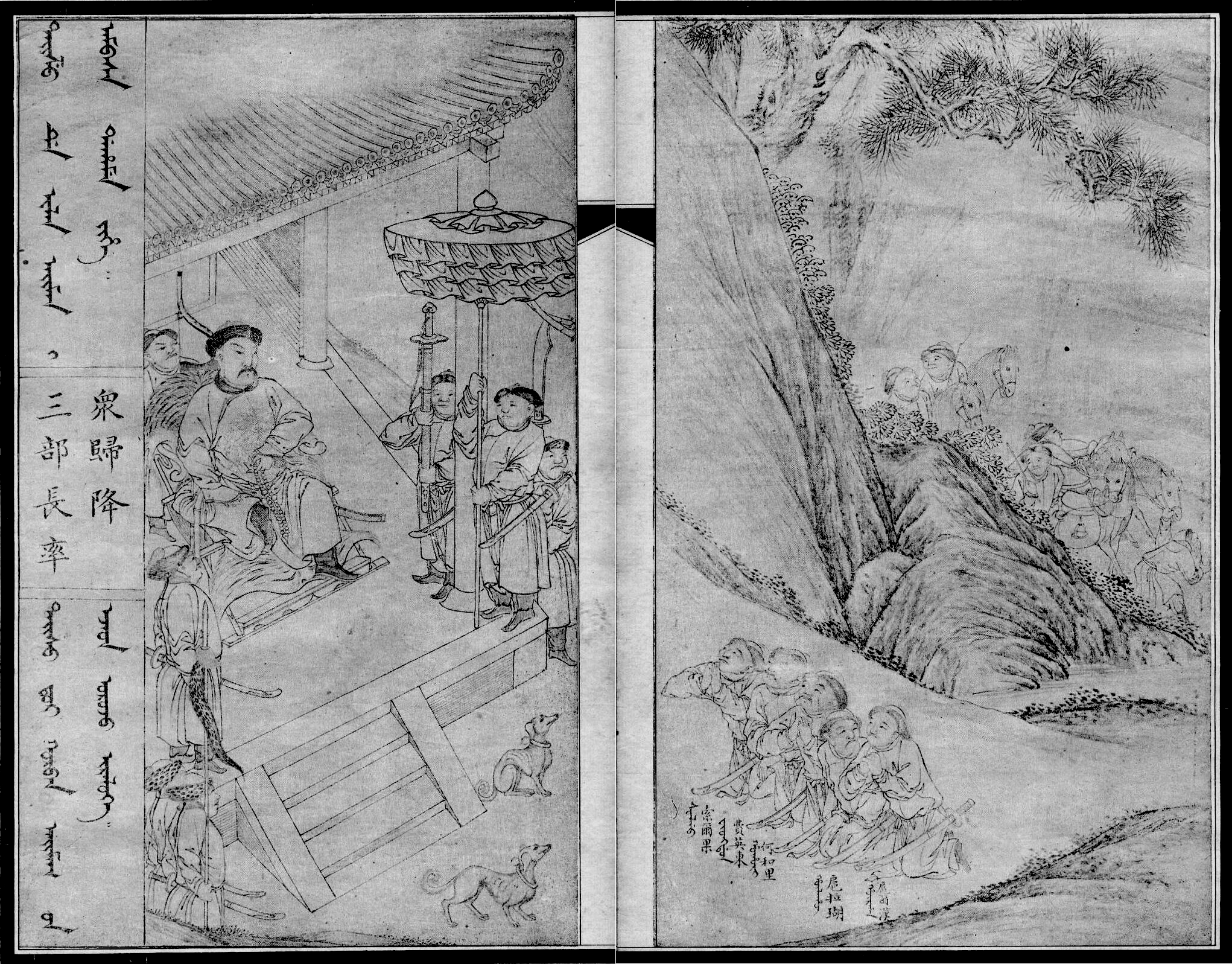
Manchu Veritable Records depicted the submission of Fiongdon(second person kneeling on the left) and his father Solgo, the chieftain of Suwan(first person on the left)

=== Background ===
He was a member of the Guwalgiya clan, and the Bordered Yellow Banner, was the second son of a Suwan (蘇完) chieftain named Solgo (索爾果) who in 1588 led five hundred of his tribesmen to join Nurhaci.

=== Military service ===
Fiongdon proved himself to be a strong and an excellent fighter and he was given the eldest granddaughter of Nurhaci to wife and was appointed to a position of importance. He repaid this trust by uncovering a plot against Nurhaci and by executing the ringleader of the plot who was his own brother-in-law. In return for this he received the title jargūci (扎爾固齊, Mongol: 'judge', 'lawgiver') which gave him a right to preside over hearings and to settle disputes. After commanding two expeditions against the Warka tribes Fiongdon went in 1599 to help the Hada who had recently submitted to Nurhaci in their struggle against the Yehe. In 1607, while covering the march of a group of Warka tribesmen who had tendered their submission, he was drawn into battle with the Ula beile, Bujantai, whom he defeated. In 1615 he became one of the Five Councilors of Nurhaci. Nurhaci declared himself Khan of the Jin Dynasty early in 1616 and made Fiongdon commander of the left wing army.

Fiongdon led the attack on Fushun in 1618 in which the Manchus clashed with the Chinese for the first time. He followed this up by defeating the army of the Chinese general Tu Sung in the following year. A few months before his death he aided in the final defeat of the Yehe tribe and the capture of its beile Gintaisi.
