= 1646 in China =

- Decades: 1620s; 1630s; 1640s; 1650s; 1660s
- See also: Other events of 1646; History of China • Timeline • Years

Events from the year 1646 in China.

== Incumbents ==
- Qing dynasty - Shunzhi Emperor
  - Co-regent: Dorgon
  - Co-regent: Jirgalang
- Southern Ming pretender - Longwu Emperor (Zhu Yujian)
- Xi dynasty - Zhang Xianzhong

== Events ==
- Transition from Ming to Qing
  - February 1646 — Qing armies seized land west of the Qiantang River from the Lu regime and defeated a ragtag force representing the Longwu Emperor in northeastern Jiangxi.
  - May — Qing forces besiege Ganzhou, the last Ming bastion in Jiangxi.
  - July, a new Southern Campaign led by Prince Bolo sent Prince Lu's Zhejiang regime into disarray and proceeded to attack the Longwu regime in Fujian.
  - late September 1646 the Longwu court left their Fujian base, but the Qing army caught up with them.
  - 6 October — Longwu and his empress were summarily executed in Tingzhou (western Fujian) on.
  - 17 October — Fuzhou falls to the Qing, Zheng Zhilong surrendered to the Qing and his son Koxinga fled to the island of Taiwan with his fleet.
  - 11 December 1646 — The Longwu Emperor's younger brother Zhu Yuyue, takes the reign title Shaowu (紹武) who had fled Fuzhou by sea, soon founded another Ming regime in Guangzhou, the capital of Guangdong province Short of official costumes, the court had to purchase robes from local theater troops.
  - 24 December — Prince of Gui Zhu Youlang established the Yongli (永曆) regime in the same vicinity.
- Sichuan massacre

== Deaths ==
- Longwu Emperor of the Southern Ming
