= Campaign to Suppress Bandits in the Border Region of Hunan–Hubei–Sichuan =

1950 military campaign in China

Campaign to Suppress Bandits in the Border Region of Huan-Hubei-Sichuan
- Part of the Chinese Civil War
Date	October 15, 1950 – November 30, 1950
Location	Border region of Hunan-Hubei-Sichuan, China
Result	Communist victory

Belligerents
Flag of the National Revolutionary Army National Revolutionary Army	PLA People's Liberation Army

Commanders and leaders
(Taiwan) Qu Boping (Taiwan) Shi Xingzhou (Taiwan) Cao Zhenya	(China) unknown

Strength
10,000+	13,000

Casualties and losses
10,000+	13,000

Campaign to Suppress Bandits in the Border Region of the Hubei-Hunan-Sichuan (湘鄂川边剿匪) was a counter-guerrilla/counterinsurgency campaign that the Communists fought against the Kuomintang guerrilla left behind after the nationalist government withdrew from mainland China. The campaign was actually fought after the Chinese Civil War was declared over by the PRC in Beijing a year earlier, and took place in the border regions of the following three Chinese provinces: Hubei, Hunan, and Sichuan, and resulted in communist victory. This campaign was part of Campaign to Suppress Bandits in Central and Southern China.

== Order of battle ==
Nationalists (over 10,000)

- Anticommunist Salvation Army of the Huan-Hubei-Sichuan Border Region commanded by Qu Boping (瞿波平)
- Military and Political Committee of the Hunan-Hubei-Sichuan Border Region commanded by Shi Xingzhou (师兴周)
- Temporarily Organized 5th Division commanded by Cao Zhenya (曹振亚)

Communists (18 battalions totaling more than 13,000)

- Two battalions of the 421st Regiment of the 141st Army
- 2nd Battalion of the 422nd Regiment of the 141st Army
- Units of the 423rd Regiment of the 141st Army
- Units of the Independent Regiment of communist Enshi Military Sub-District.
- Units of the Laifeng (来凤) county battalion.

== Campaign ==
Communists decided to eradicate more than ten thousand nationalist guerrillas mostly consisted of bandits in the border region of Huan-Hubei-Sichuan, in a vast area bordered by Laifeng (来凤) county in Hubei in the north, Sangzhi (桑植) and Shuishun (水顺) in the east, Yongsui (永绥) county and Baojing (保靖) County in Hunan in the south, and Youyang in the west. Communist western Hunan Military Sub-District formed the Northern Front Bandit Eradication Command, and made plans with other communist forces in adjacent regions under the direction of communist Hunan Military District.

On October 15, 1950, communists attacked the nationalist stronghold in the Dragon (龙) Mountain in multiple directions. After more than twenty days of fighting, more than four thousand bandits were annihilated in the northern part of the Dragon (龙) Mountain by two battalions of the 421st Regiment of the communist 141st Division. In the meantime, communist troops of the communist Enshi Military Sub-District killed over nineteen hundred bandits of the nationalist Anticommunist Salvation Army of Huan-Hubei-Sichuan Border Region in the Dragon (龙) Mountain. Another twelve hundred bandits also surrendered. The commander of the nationalist Anticommunist Salvation Army of the Huan-Hubei-Sichuan Border Region, Qu Boping (瞿波平), with only several bodyguards left was eventually forced to surrender to the communists in November 1950 with the remaining survivors.

To the southwest of the Dragon (龙) Mountain, the other band of bandits was also badly mauled by the attacking communists in the border region of Sichuan – Hunan. As the nationalist survivors attempted to flee into Sichuan, they were beaten back by the communist forces of the communist Youyang Military Sub-District. The 2nd Battalions of the 422nd Regiment of the communist 141st Division launched a mop up operation with the help of other communist units and succeeded in killing more than nine hundred bandits. The nationalist commander of the bandit, Shi Xingzhou (师兴周), was eventually forced to surrender with the last survivors to the communists after holding out for more than twenty days.

The remnant of the nationalist Temporarily Organized 5th Division fled to the north of Yongshun (永顺) County, where they were surrounded by units of the 421st Regiment and units of the 423rd Regiment of the communist 141st Division, and units of the Independent Regiment of communist Enshi Military Sub-District. In the battle at Nine Dragons (九龙) Mountain, Cao Zhenya (曹振亚), the commander of the nationalist Temporarily Organized 5th Division was killed and the surviving fifteen hundred nationalist guerrillas were completely annihilated. The campaign concluded with communist victory and in addition to annihilating over ten thousand bandits, including more than a hundred and ten nationalist commanders, the communists also managed to capture over seven thousand guns.

== See also ==
- Outline of the Chinese Civil War
- National Revolutionary Army
- History of the People's Liberation Army
- Chinese Civil War
