= 1647 in China =

- Decades: 1620s; 1630s; 1640s; 1650s; 1660s
- See also: Other events of 1647; History of China • Timeline • Years

Events from the year 1647 in China.

== Incumbents ==
- Qing dynasty - Shunzhi Emperor
  - Co-regent: Dorgon
  - Co-regent: Jirgalang
- Southern Ming pretender - Yongli Emperor (Zhu Youlang)
- Xi dynasty - Zhang Xianzhong

== Events ==
- Transition from Ming to Qing
  - 20 January 1647, a small Qing force led by former Southern Ming commander Li Chengdong (李成東) captures Guangzhou, kills the Shaowu Emperor and sends the Yongli Emperor fleeing to Nanning in Guangxi.

== Deaths ==
- Zhang Xianzhong - killed in Shaanxi by Qing forces
- Gao Guiying - female anti-Qing military leader
