= 1645 in China =

- Decades: 1620s; 1630s; 1640s; 1650s; 1660s
- See also: Other events of 1645; History of China • Timeline • Years

Events from the year 1645 in China.

== Incumbents ==
- Qing dynasty - Shunzhi Emperor
  - Co-regent: Dorgon
  - Co-regent: Jirgalang
- Southern Ming - Hongguang Emperor, Longwu Emperor
- Shun dynasty - Li Zicheng
- Xi dynasty - Zhang Xianzhong

== Events ==
- Transition from Ming to Qing
  - From newly captured Xi'an, in early April 1645 the Qing mounted a campaign against the rich commercial and agricultural region of Jiangnan south of the lower Yangtze River
  - May 20–30 - Yangzhou massacre, one of the most destructive massacres in history
  - June, Dorgon eventually decreed that all official documents should refer to him as "Imperial Uncle Prince Regent" (Huang shufu shezheng wang 皇叔父攝政王), which left him one step short of claiming the throne for himself.
- Sichuan massacre
- Regarding the Chinese Rites controversy, Rome's Sacred Congregation for the Propagation of the Faith sided with the Dominicans over the Jesuit in 1645 by condemning the Chinese rites based on their brief, rendering them incompatible with Roman Catholic faith
- Li Zicheng fled to Xi'an in Shaanxi. It is not exactly known how Li died and there are multiple accounts of his death which vary and some are exaggerated by folklore. Across multiple sources, the year of his death is said to be in 1645. One account states that in the summer of 1645 Li went to raid a village in search of sustenance with his remaining followers and was killed by soldiers guarding the village.

== Deaths ==
- Shi Kefa, Ming dynasty official and calligrapher, killed in the defense of Yangzhou
- Li Zicheng
