= Shanghai–Wuhan high-speed train =

Railway service in China

Shanghai–Wuhan high-speed train 沪汉高速动车组列车
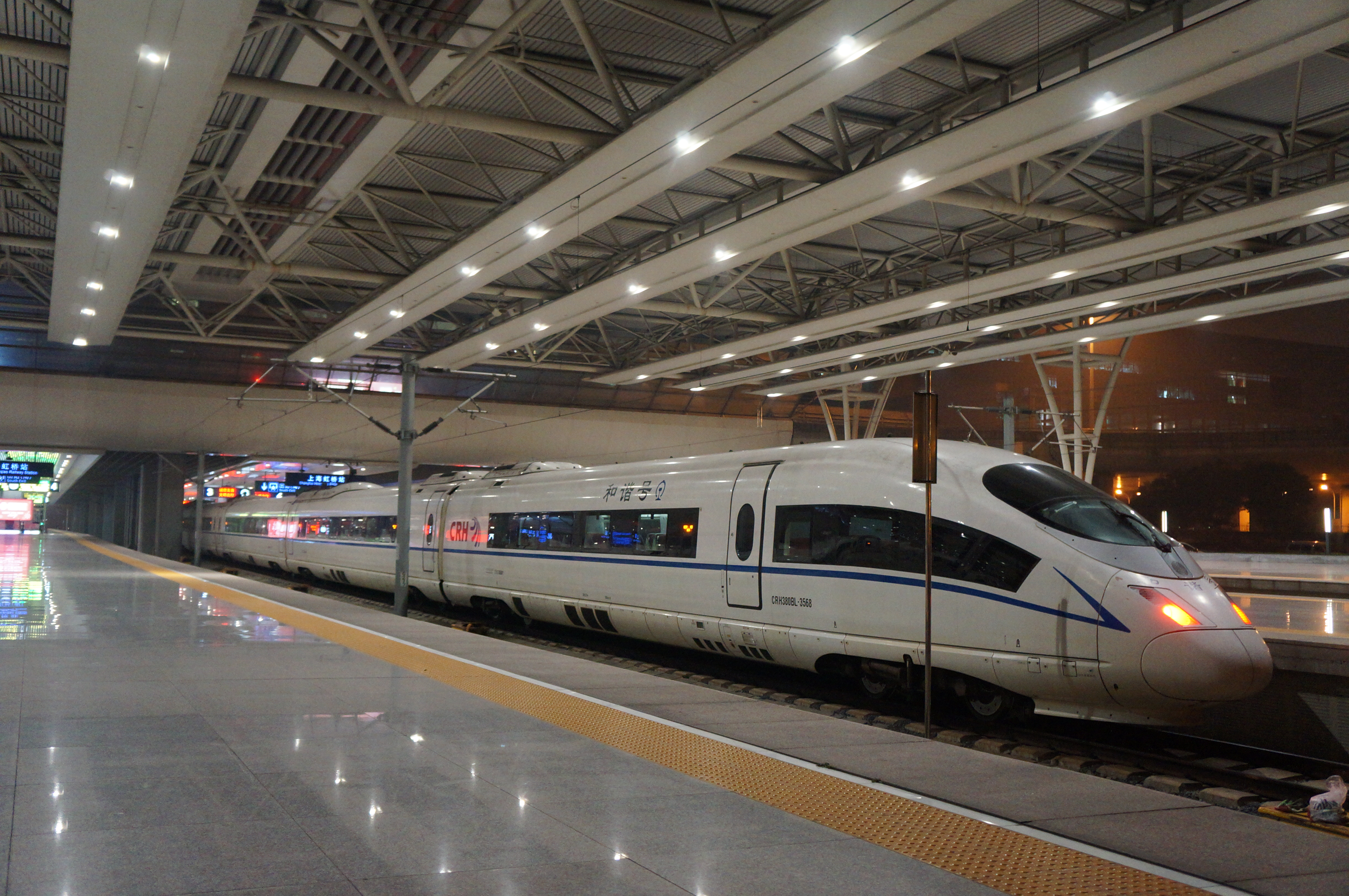
- A CRH380BL EMU on the G597 service at Shanghai Hongqiao

Overview
- Service type: G-series trains
- Status: Operational
- Locale: China
- Predecessor: Shanghai–Wuhan D-series trains
- First service: 28 December 2013
- Current operator(s): CR Shanghai; CR Wuhan; CR Xi'an

Route
- Termini: Shanghai Hongqiao: Wuhan; Hankou
- Average journey time: 3h 53m - 5h 6m
- Train number(s): G597-600, G675-678, G1719-1726, G1735-1738, G1763-1769
- Line(s) used: Beijing–Shanghai HSR; Shanghai–Wuhan–Chengdu HSR

On-board services
- Class(es): Business seat; First class seat; Second class seat
- Catering facilities: Dining car; Trolley refreshment service

Technical
- Rolling stock: CRH380AL, CRH380BL, CR400AF
- Track gauge: 1,435 mm (4 ft 8 1/2 in)
- Track owner(s): China Railway

The Shanghai–Wuhan high-speed train (沪汉高速动车组列车) is a high-speed train service between Shanghai and Wuhan, the capital of Hubei Province. Trains are operated by CR Shanghai, CR Wuhan and CR Xi'an.

== History ==
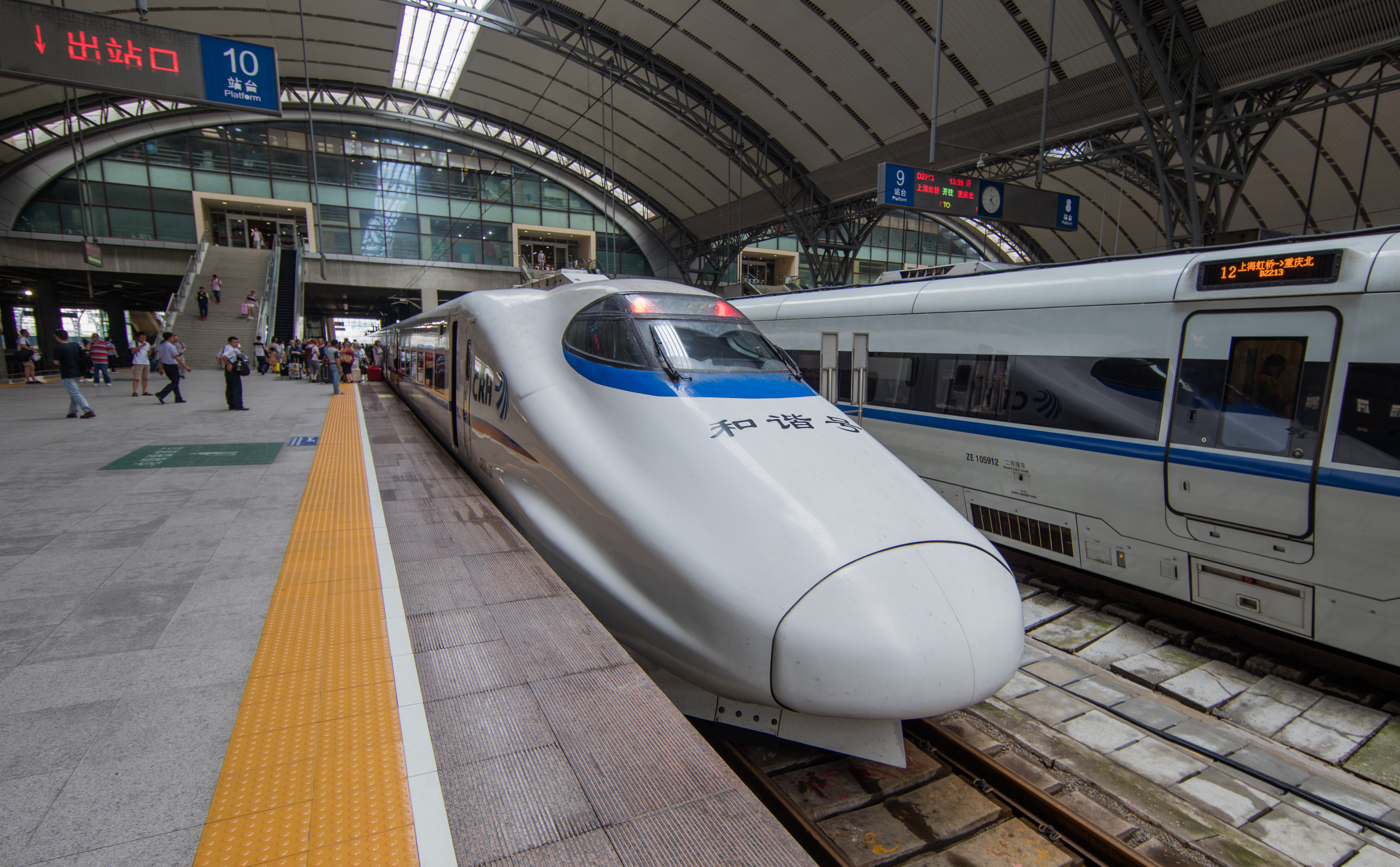
A CRH2A EMU on D3054 service at Hankou

The CRH service between Shanghai and Wuhan started on 1 April 2009, when the D-series trains commenced operations between the two cities.

The high-speed train service (G-series trains) between Shanghai and Wuhan commenced on 28 December 2013, reducing the travel time to 4-5 hours.

== Operations ==
The G598/599, G1720/1721 and G1724/1725 trains towards Wuhan and the G600/597, G1722/1719 and G1726/1723 trains offer faster service with fewer intermediate stops, and are called "benchmark trains" (Chinese: 标杆车). Other trains have more stops and longer travelling times.

According to the train numbering rules of China Railway, odd numbers are for south or west bound trains and even numbers are for north or east bound trains. The trains from Shanghai to Wuhan travel northbound on Beijing–Shanghai HSR and westbound on Shanghai–Wuhan–Chengdu HSR, and the trains from Wuhan to Shanghai travel eastbound on Shanghai–Wuhan–Chengdu HSR and southbound on Beijing–Shanghai HSR. Therefore, all the train services on this route have 2 train numbers for the same service.

- ● : stop at the station
- ↓: pass the station
- —: out of service range
- : Benchmark train

=== Shanghai → Wuhan ===
Stops	G598/599	G676/677	G1724/1725	G1720/1721	G1736/1737	G1768/1769	G1764/1765
Shanghai Hongqiao	●	●	●	●	●	●	●
Kunshan South	↓	↓	↓	↓	●	↓	●
Suzhou North	↓	●	●	●	↓	↓	●
Wuxi East	↓	●	↓	↓	↓	●	●
Changzhou North	↓	●	↓	↓	●	●	●
Zhenjiang South	↓	●	↓	↓	↓	●	●
Nanjing South	●	●	●	●	●	●	●
Quanjiao	●	●	↓	↓	●	↓	●
Hefei South	●	●	●	●	●	●	●
Lu'an	↓	●	↓	↓	●	↓	↓
Jinzhai	↓	●	↓	↓	●	↓	↓
Macheng North	↓	↓	↓	↓	●	↓	●
Wuhan	—	●	—	●	●	—	●
Hankou	●	—	●	—	—	●	—

=== Wuhan → Shanghai ===
Stops	G1766/1763	G1722/1719	G1738/1735	G1770/1767	G678/675	G600/597	G1726/1723
Hankou	—	—	—	●	—	—	●
Wuhan	●	●	●	—	●	●	—
Hong'an West	●	↓	●	↓	↓	↓	↓
Macheng North	↓	↓	●	↓	↓	↓	↓
Jinzhai	↓	↓	●	↓	↓	↓	↓
Lu'an	●	↓	●	↓	●	↓	↓
Hefei South	●	●	●	●	●	●	●
Nanjing South	●	●	●	●	●	●	●
Zhenjiang South	●	↓	●	●	●	↓	↓
Danyang North	↓	↓	↓	↓	●	↓	↓
Changzhou North	●	↓	↓	●	●	↓	↓
Wuxi East	●	↓	●	●	↓	↓	↓
Suzhou North	●	●	●	●	●	↓	●
Kunshan South	●	↓	↓	↓	●	↓	↓
Shanghai Hongqiao	●	●	●	●	●	●	●

== Rolling stock ==
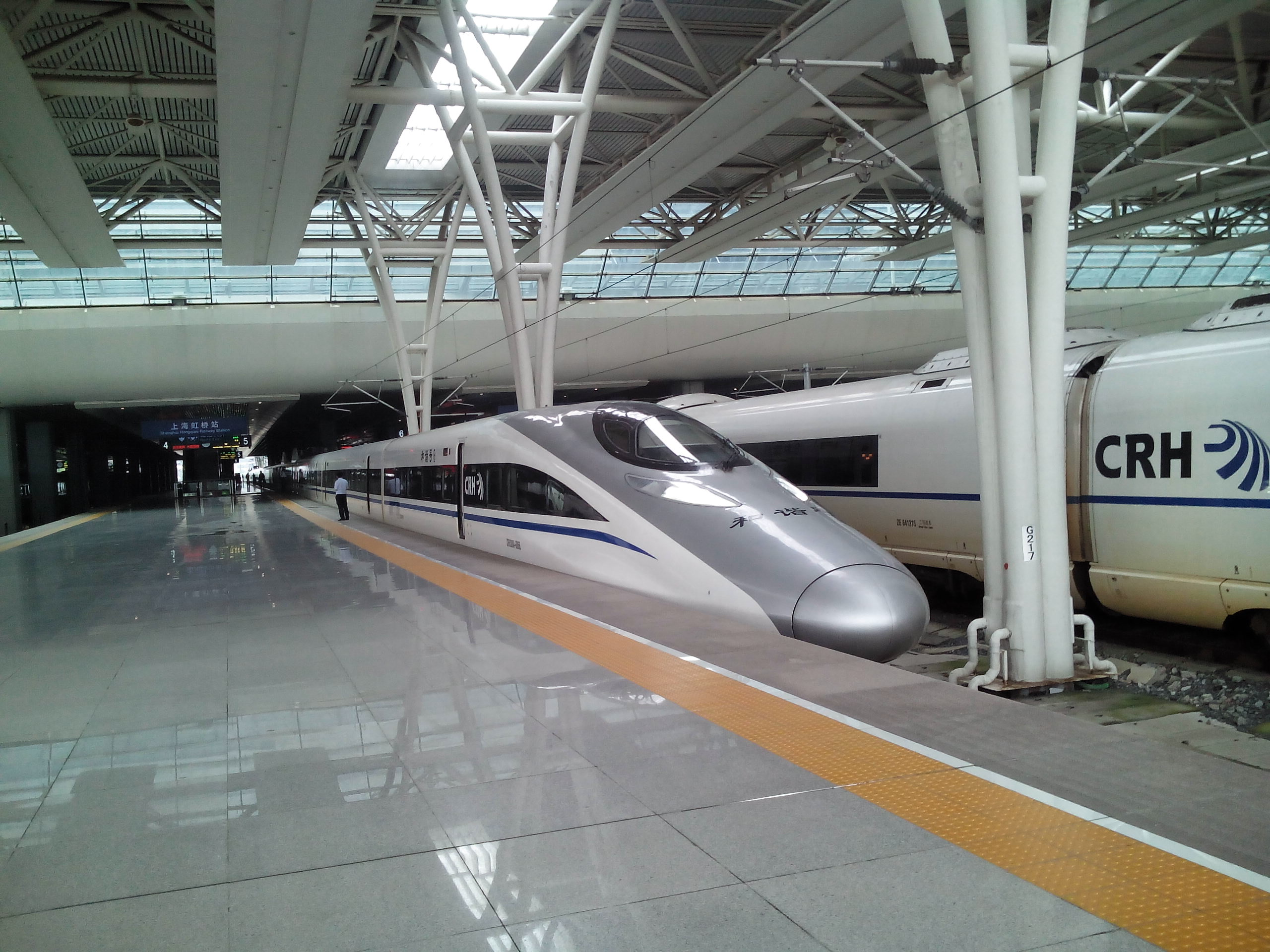
A CRH380AL EMU on train G676 service

The services are operated with CRH380AL, CRH380BL and CR400AF trainsets.
