= Campaign to Suppress Bandits in Liuwandashan =

1950 military campaign

- Part of Chinese Civil War
Date	December 20, 1950 – February 1951
Location	Guangxi, China
Result	Communist victory

Belligerents
Flag of the National Revolutionary Army National Revolutionary Army	PLA People's Liberation Army

Commanders and leaders
Flag of the ROC Yang Fengchi 杨凤池; Da Ou 达欧; Zeng Zhongrou 曾仲荣	Flag of the PRC ?

Strength
15,000+	8,000

Casualties and losses
15,000+	Minor

Campaign to Suppress Bandits in Liuwandashan was a counter-guerrilla / counterinsurgency campaign the communists fought against the nationalist guerrilla that was mostly consisted of bandits and nationalist regular troops left behind after the nationalist regime withdrew from mainland China. The campaign was fought during the Chinese Civil War in the post-World War II era in the region of Liuwandashan (六万大山, literally meaning Sixty-Thousand Great Mountains) in Guangxi and resulted in communist victory. This campaign is part of Campaign to Suppress Bandits in Guangxi, which in turn, was part of Campaign to Suppress Bandits in Central and Southern China.

== Prelude ==
In June 1950, three regiments of the communist 45th Army and the Independent 24th Regiment of Canton Southern Front Military Sub-district jointly launched an operation against the local nationalist guerrilla in the southern end of the Liuwandashan (六万大山), succeeding in killing over 1,400 of nationalists. The remnant of the nationalist guerrilla retreated into the heart of the mountain and their number totaled more than 15,000.

== Order of battle ==
Nationalist:

- 3rd Column of the Anticommunist National Salvation Army in Southern Guangxi

Communist:

- 460th Regiment of the Yulin Military Sub-district
- Independent Regiment of the Yulin Military Sub-district
- 135th Division

== Battles ==
On December 20, 1950, communist forces consisted of the 460th Regiment and the Independent Regiment of the communist Yulin Military Sub-district and the 135th Division began their eradication campaign against the nationalist guerrilla mostly consisted of bandits. The Independent Regiment of the communist Yulin Military Sub-district attacked from the north, and 460th Regiment of the communist Yulin Military Sub-district and the 403rd Regiment of the communist 135th Division attacked from south, and the 404th Regiment of the communist 135th Division advanced toward the regions of Fengshan, (凤山), Ningtan, (宁潭), Yingqiao (英桥), Minzhi, (民治), Wangke, (王科) and Liushui (六水). The rest of communist 135th Division advanced toward the heart of the mountain. After killing over 300 enemy troops, the organized nationalist resistance collapsed, and the remaining battles became part of eradication operations. By the next February, the communist victory was complete.

== Conclusion ==
By February 1951, the campaign concluded with communist victory, with nationalist commanders Yang Fengchi (杨凤池), Da Ou (达欧), and Zeng Zhongrou (曾仲荣) either killed or captured, and the 15,000 strong nationalist guerrilla force in Liuwandashan (六万大山) completely annihilated. In addition, the communists also captured 14 artillery pieces, 86 machine guns, and over 16,000 firearms.

== See also ==
- Outline of the Chinese Civil War
- National Revolutionary Army
- History of the People's Liberation Army
- Chinese Civil War
