= Campaign to Suppress Bandits in Western Hunan =

1950 military campaign in China

- Part of the Chinese Civil War
Date	October 15, 1950 – December 1950
Location	Western Hunan, China
Result	Communist victory

Belligerents
Flag of the National Revolutionary Army National Revolutionary Army	PLA People's Liberation Army

Commanders and leaders
Flag of the ROC Jiang Xieqin 蒋燮琴	Flag of the PRC Cao Lihuai 曹里怀; Liu Xianquan 刘贤权

Strength
23,000+	40,000

Casualties and losses
23,000+	Minor

Campaign to Suppress Bandits in Western Hunan was a counter-guerrilla / counterinsurgency campaign the communists fought against the Kuomintang guerrilla left behind after the nationalist regime withdrew from mainland China. The campaign was fought during the Chinese Civil War in the post-World War II era in western Hunan Province, and resulted in a PLA victory. This campaign was part of Campaign to Suppress Bandits in Central and Southern China.

== Prelude ==
After most part of Hunan had fallen into communist hands, the surviving nationalist troops joined bandits in the period from June 1950 – September 1950 in western Hunan to continue their anticommunist struggles and reorganized into the Anticommunist National Salvation Army totaling more than 23,000 troops, controlling regions with more than a million population.

After communists secured central Hunan, they turned their attention to western Hunan and begun to plan the complete eradication of bandits in the region. A total of more than 40,000 troops were mobilized, mostly from the Hunan Military District of the communist Central and Southern China Military Region. Troops of the communist 47th Army, 136th Division, and other communist detachments in the adjacent provinces including that of Sichuan, Hubei and Guizhou were assigned to two commands, the northern command and the southern command, respectively commanded by the communist Western Hunan Military District commander-in-chief Cao Lihuai (曹里怀) and deputy commander-in-chief Liu Xianquan (刘贤权).

== Campaign ==
The campaign was fought in two stages, with the first stage lasting from October 15, 1950, to November 15, 1950. The communists amassed a total of ten regiments to first attack bandits in northern region of western Hunan based in the Dragon (Long, 龙) Mountains. After ten days of continuous attacks, the local bandits were completely annihilated. A half-month-long mop-up operation continued, finally resulting in the annihilation of over four thousand bandits. In the south, on October 20, 1950, communists took the town of Suining (绥宁) and Jing (靖) County occupied by the bandits and surrounded over six thousands bandits by cutting off their escape route to the north. After fierce battles which ended on November 15, 1950, over 5,500 bandits were annihilated, and Jiang Xieqin (蒋燮琴), the local nationalist commander-in-chief of the Third Front Army of the Southern China Anticommunist National Salvation Army, was captured alive.

The second stage of the campaign begun in mid-November 1950. Communists deployed a total of eleven regiments, seven of which were assigned to conduct local mopping up operations. Another four communist regiments attacked and took regions including Nine Dragons Mountain (Jiulongshan, 九龙山), Phoenix (凤凰), Mayang, (麻阳), Huang (晃) County, and Passage (Tongdao, 通道), and by the end of December 1950, the local bandits were completely annihilated. The campaign concluded with communist victory and the complete elimination of the problem of bandits that plagued western Hunan for several centuries.

== See also ==
- Outline of the Chinese Civil War
- National Revolutionary Army
- History of the People's Liberation Army
- Chinese Civil War
