= Mingshan Reservoir =

- Interactive map of Mingshan Reservoir
- Country: China
- Location: Macheng, Hubei
- Construction began: October 1, 1957

Mingshan Reservoir (simplified Chinese: 明山水库; traditional Chinese: 明山水庫; pinyin: Míngshān shuǐkù) is a reservoir in Macheng, Hubei, China, located on the Baiguo River, a tributary of the Jushui River.

The construction of the reservoir officially started on October 1, 1957, and was completed in June 1959. The earth dam under the reservoir was impermeable with reinforced concrete interlocking pipe columns. The reservoir was directed and supported by Tao Shuzeng, then director of the Hubei Provincial Water Resources Department. The Central Committee of the Chinese Communist Party attached great importance to the construction of the dam of the reservoir, and Premier Zhou Enlai personally inspected the construction site of the reservoir.

The reservoir, with a control basin area of 182 square kilometers and a total storage capacity of 169 million cubic meters, is a national key demonstration project of the People's Republic of China.

In 2010, a netizen searched on Google Maps and found that the Minshan Reservoir appeared as a "giant dragon", causing widespread concern in Chinese society.
