= Dashiban Reservoir =

- Location: Fuzihe Town, Macheng City, Hubei Province
- Construction began: Around 1960

Dashiban Reservoir (literally meaning Big Flagstone Reservoir; simplified Chinese: 大石板水库; traditional Chinese: 大石板水庫; pinyin: Dàshíbǎn shuǐkù) is a small (1) scale reservoir in Fuzi River Town, Macheng City, Hubei Province, China, located on the upper reaches of the Sha River.

Dashiban Reservoir was built around 1960. Around 2014, in response to the problem of eutrophication of water quality in the Reservoir, the ecological farming model of human-released natural breeding was implemented to develop ecological and organic fisheries. In November 2018, the ecological environment of the reservoir was restored.

The water system ecological restoration project of Dashiban Reservoir is one of the ten major projects declared by Fuzi River Town in 2020, with a total investment of about ¥6.55 billion for all projects.

In July 2016, Huanggang area suffered from extraordinarily heavy rainfall and flooding, Fuzi River Town was also seriously affected. On the early morning of the 6th, Dashiban Reservoir was in an emergency. However, after the rescue, the reservoir was safe and sound.
