= Wei Yijie =

Qing dynasty politician (1616–1686)

Wei Yijie 魏裔介
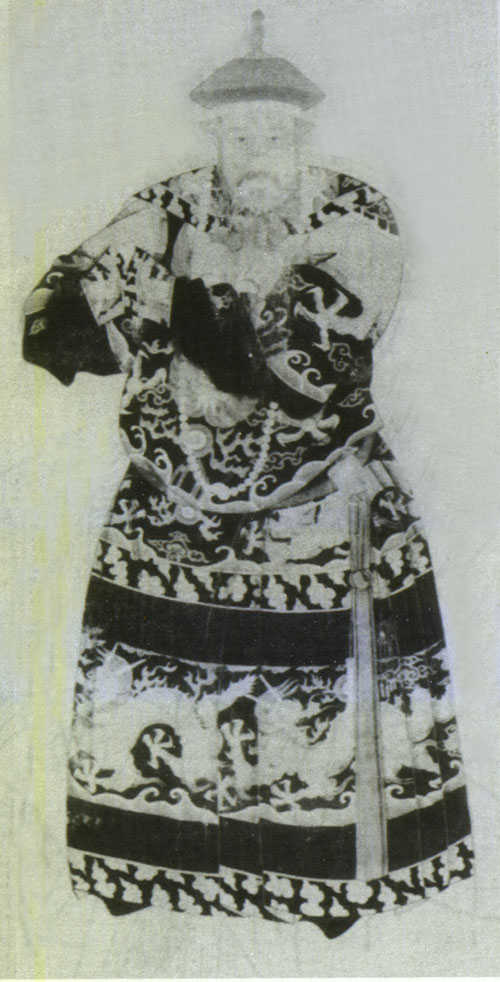

Grand Secretary of the Baohe Hall
- In office 1670–1671

Grand Secretary of the Palace Secretariat Academy
- In office 1664–1670

Minister of Personnel
- In office June 26, 1663 – January 5, 1665 Serving with Asha
- Preceded by: Sun Tingquan
- Succeeded by: Du Lide

Personal details
- Born: August 19, 1616 Baixiang County, Ming China
- Died: April 27, 1686 (aged 69) Baixiang County, Qing China

Wei Yijie (Chinese: 魏裔介; August 19, 1616 – April 27, 1686) was a prominent Han Chinese scholar and official serving in the early Qing Dynasty, during the rules of the Shunzhi Emperor, Oboi, and the Kangxi Emperor and was known for his focus and advocacy of the reformation the Examination system.

== Early career ==
Wei Yijie was from Baixiang, in western Zhili. He passed the 1646 Jinshi examination and gained a reputation for his focus on the examination system. Wei served in his first administrative position in 1648 when he was the placed as the principal examiner for the Shanxi province. In the same year, he wrote about his views on how to best reform the examination system, particularly the examination used by the military, raising it to a level more closely in line with the civil examination, the banning of the publishing of examination essays by non-governmental entities, and the publication and introduction of the Xiaojing into a regular rotation of questions based on the Classic in examinations. In 1655, Wei was promoted to the post of principal vice censor-in-chief and was responsible for the administration of the metropolitan military examination in that year. In 1659, Wei made a petition to the emperor critical about infanticide and the drowning of little girls in the southeastern provinces of Jiangsu, Anhui, Jiangxi, and Fujian. The Shunzhi Emperor agreed with Wei and issued an edict against Infanticide.

Sometime between 1659 and 1661, Wei left his position as censor and held no position in office. When the Shunzhi Emperor died in 1661, Wei was recalled to serve as censor during the regency period of the reign of the Kangxi Emperor.

== Career under Kangxi ==
During the regency period of the Kangxi reign, Wei Yijie used his high position as principal vice censor-in-chief to influence the regency leadership in reforming the Examination system that was in place. In his work "Keju yi", Wei expresses his disdain of the examination format used at the time, which placed great emphasis on the Eight Legged Essay, recommending instead examinations which focused more on the policy aspects of the exams by placing them in the first session of examinations and moving the Eight legged Essay to a later session of the exam. Wei's preference to policy questions was due to his belief that scholars chosen for their response to these questions would benefit the dynasty because these scholars would be very knowledgeable about the issues that affected China. In 1663, the Ministry of Rites announced a format change to the examination system that matched what Wei had proposed, which would take place in the 1664 and 1667 exam years.

Wei was an advocate for the resumption of the requirement for Bannermen to take examination, which had been rescinded in 1657 due to provincial instability, in order to obtain office in the central government. Wei believed that for the dynasty to continue to exist, Bannermen would need to adhere to the same standards that other officials met in order to maintain an effective central government. In 1663, due to the influence of Wei proposals, translations for the examinations were made in Manchu, Mongolian, and Hanjun. Later in the Kangxi reign, translations were discontinued and all Bannermen were required to take examinations in Han Chinese. In 1665, Wei was made a Grand Secretary of the Nei Mishuyuan, one of the Inner Three Academies. In 1670, Wei was promoted to Minister of Rites and conducted ceremonial and literary assignments such as editing the Shunzhi Veritable Record. Wei fell ill in early 1671 and resigned from his position in the Ministry of Rites and subsequently retired from official service and was given the title of Grand Mentor of the Heir Apparent in 1672 for his service to the Qing Dynasty. Wei remained in retirement until his death on April 27, 1686.

== Religious views ==
Wei Yijie was officially a follower of orthodox Neo-Confucian philosopher Zhu Xi, but is believed to have been a secret Christian in his private life. Wei is known to have compared Christianity and Confucianism in a positive manner in a testimonial on the seventieth birthday of the Jesuit missionary Johann Adam Schall von Bell.
