= Campaign to Suppress Bandits in Dabieshan =

Campaign to Suppress Bandits in Danbieshan
- Part of Chinese Civil War
Date	September 5, 1949 – March 1950
Location	Dabieshan, China
Result	Communist victory

Belligerents
Flag of the National Revolutionary Army National Revolutionary Army	PLA People's Liberation Army

Commanders and leaders
Flag of the ROC Wang Xian 汪宪; Fan Xun 樊迅	Flag of the PRC Wang Shusheng 王树声

Strength
17,000+	30,000

Casualties and losses
15,400	Minor

Campaign to Suppress Bandits in Dabieshan was a counter-guerrilla / counterinsurgency campaign the communists fought against the nationalist guerrilla that was mostly consisted of bandits and nationalist regular troops left behind after the nationalist regime withdrew from mainland China. The campaign was fought during the Chinese Civil War in the post-World War II era in the region of Dabieshan (大别山, literally meaning Great Departure Mountain) and resulted in communist victory. This campaign was part of Campaign to Suppress Bandits in Central and Southern China.

== Order of battle ==
Nationalist (17,000 total):

- People's Self-Defense Army of the Hubei – Henan – Anhui Border Region

Communist (30,000 total):

- 71st Division of the 24th Army
- 126th Division of the 42nd Army
- Two garrison brigades of the Northern Anhui Military District
- Three regiments of the Henan Military District
- Independent 3rd Division of Hubei Military District
- Units of Huanggang Military Sub-District

== Campaign ==
In order to eradicate the 17,000 strong People's Self-Defense Army of the Anhui – Hubei – Henan Border Region (the nationalist guerrilla consisted of mostly bandits) under the command of Wang Zongxian (汪宪及) Fan Xun (樊迅) in the Dabie Mountain, communists deployed over 30,000 troops including 71st Division of the 24th Army, the 126th Division of the 42nd Army, two garrison brigades of the Northern Anhui Military District, three regiments of the Henan Military District, the Independent 3rd Division of Hubei Military District, and units of Huanggang Military Sub-District. A new command was created as the Hubei – Henan – Anhui Border Region Bandit Eradication Command. The communist second commander-in-chief of Hubei Military District of Central China Military Region, Wang Shusheng (王树声) was named as both the commander-in-chief and the political commissar of the newly formed command in August 1949, and he was later to be awarded with rank of Senior General in 1955. On August 10, 1949, the communists made up their strategy in attacking the enemy in three fronts: east, west and south.

On September 5, 1949, communists launched their simultaneous attacks on the nationalist guerrilla mostly consisted of bandits and the nationalist stronghold Golden Camp, (Jinzhai, 金寨) county fell into the communist hands on the same day. The bandits attempted to fight a guerrilla war in smaller formations and communists countered by eliminating their adversary's guerilla bases in regions including Liangban (两畈) precinct of Golden Camp, (Jinzhai, 金寨), Green (青) precinct of Shangcheng (商城) county, Muzi Shop (木子店) of Macheng (麻城) county,. Communists in the eastern front attacked regions around Golden Camp, (Jinzhai, 金寨) county and Gushi (固始). On September 30, 1949, the nationalist guerrilla headquarter in Hat Top Mountain (Maodingshan 帽顶山) 30 km to the south of Golden Camp, (Jinzhai, 金寨) was discovered by a detachment of the communist 71st Division, who immediately attacked and annihilated the nationalist guerrilla consisted of mostly bandits. Soon after, another 1,700 bandits under the command of nationalist commanders Zhang Lianhe (张连合) and Wang Yaonan (汪耀南) were completely annihilated by the communists. The nationalist commander-in-chief Wang Zongxian (汪宪及) and the first deputy commander-in-chief Fan Xun (樊迅) of the local nationalist guerrilla command were both captured alive.

In the meantime, communist force at the northern front concentrated attack in the region to the south of Shangcheng (商城) county, annihilated more than a thousand local bandits, including their commander, Feng Chunbo (冯春波). Communist force at the southern front concentrated on the regions including Golden Camp, (Jinzhai, 金寨), Hemp City (Macheng, 麻城) county, and Luotian (罗田), annihilated over 1,200 bandits under the command of Zhou Xiangbo (周香波) and Rao Guodong,(饶国栋). By the end of November 1949, over 12,000 nationalists had been killed or captured, and nationalist force with strength over 100 troops no longer existed in the region, and the large scale military operation had thus turned into mop up operations of much less scale, with much increased political and propaganda pressure, which lasted until the end of the campaign.

== Conclusion ==
In March 1953, the Campaign to Suppress Bandits in Dabieshan ended with communist victory. In addition to completely annihilating over 15,400 nationalist guerrilla troops, the communists also succeeded in capturing 81 artillery pieces, 13,883 firearms, and large amount of supplies.

== See also ==
- Outline of the Chinese Civil War
- National Revolutionary Army
- History of the People's Liberation Army
- Chinese Civil War
