= Chronology of the Shunzhi reign =

This is a chronicle of important events that took place under the Shunzhi Emperor of the Qing dynasty (1644–1912). It spans from the death of his predecessor Hong Taiji (r. 1626–1643) in September 1643, to the emperor's own death on 5 February 1661, seven days into the eighteenth year of the Shunzhi reign period. These dates do not correspond perfectly with the Shunzhi era itself, which started on 8 February 1644—on New Year's Day of the lunisolar year following the emperor's accession—and ended on 17 February 1662 (the last day of the 18th year of Shunzhi), more than one solar year after the emperor's death. The posthumous events related to the Shunzhi Emperor's burial and posthumous cult are also included.

== Dorgon regency ==
=== 1643 ===
- September 21: Hong Taiji dies after a successful seventeen-year reign during which the Qing became a major power in northeast Asia. His death threatens to split the Manchus just as they are preparing to attack the Ming.
- September 26: a Deliberative Council of princes and high officials is convened and decides that five-year-old Fulin, Hong Taiji's ninth son, will succeed his father, but that Hong Taiji's half-brother Dorgon and Jirgalang will be his co-regents. This deal is a compromise between those who wanted to keep the throne in Hung Taiji's descent (the main candidate was Hong Taiji's eldest son Hooge) and those who supported Dorgon.
- October 8: at the age of six suì, Fulin officially becomes Emperor of the Qing dynasty.

=== 1644 ===
- February 8: in Xi'an, Li Zicheng founds the Shun dynasty with the official dynastic name "Great Shun" and proclaims himself King.
- February 17: Jirgalang willingly yields control of all official matters to his co-regent Dorgon.
- March 5: Dorgon sends an amicable letter to Li Zicheng proposing that they "devise a plan in common to unite their forces" against the Ming.
- March 17: the Shun army occupies Taiyuan in Shanxi.
- April 5: Seeing the progress of rebel armies in north China, the Chongzhen Emperor issues a call for the immediate help of any military commandant in the empire.
- April 24: Li Zicheng enters Beijing, the capital of the Ming empire.
- April 25: the Chongzhen Emperor commits suicide on a hill behind the Forbidden City.
- April 26: Wu Sangui, a powerful Ming general, moves his army through Shanhai Pass (at the eastern end of the Great Wall) and marches toward Beijing in response to the emperor's distress call. When he hears that the capital has fallen, Wu returns to fortify Shanhai Pass. Wu's departure from the fortified city of Ningyuan, where Ming armies had defeated Qing founder Nurhaci in 1626, leaves all territory outside the Great Wall under Qing control.
- April 29: the victorious Li Zicheng holds an audience with several thousand Ming officials outside the Donghua Gate of the Forbidden City. Assisted by his main Grand Secretary Niu Jinxing (牛金星), Li selected 92 officials to serve in the Shun government. The remaining literati are given over to Shun generals for punishment.
- May 5: Wu Sangui routs an army led by Tang Tong, which Li Zicheng had despatched to attack Shanhai Pass.
- May 10: Tang Tong's defeated army returns toward Shanhai Pass with reinforcements, but is again defeated by Wu Sangui. Wu takes the city of Yongping (永平) on the road to Beijing.
- May 13: words reach the Qing capital of Shengjing that Li Zicheng has been brutalizing former Ming officials and the population of Beijing. Grand Secretary Fan Wencheng uses these news to argue for a Qing intervention in China. Dorgon agrees to mount a military expedition to punish the rebels and occupy the Central Plains of China.
- May 14: Dorgon leads the Qing "Grand Army" out of Shengjing and starts marching south toward the Great Wall.
- May 18: After the defeat of two of his armies a few days earlier, Li Zicheng decides to take Shanhai Pass himself: he leaves Beijing with an army of 60,000 troops.
- May 20: two of Wu Sangui's lieutenants arrive at Dorgon's camp at the Liao River carrying a message from their master asking the Manchus to help Wu defeat Li Zicheng's bandits and restore the Ming dynasty in return for "great profits" (大利). Dorgon sends a letter back to Wu Sangui offering. Later that day the Manchus hear for the first time that the Chongzhen emperor was dead. Still on that day, but as a result of earlier plans, small groups of Qing troops start to cross the Great Wall to distribute written proclamations announcing that the Qing army will not harm the population and will only kill Li Zicheng's bandits.
- May 25: By that date, Li Zicheng's army was already camping in the outskirts of Shanhai Pass, near the Sha River a few kilometers west of the Shanhai Pass garrison; Wu Sangui sends his troops to confront him there. Dorgon receives a letter confirming that Wu Sangui has accepted to work for the Qing: he takes his army on a forced march toward Shanhai Pass.
- May 26: having covered more than 150 kilometers in 24 hours, Dorgon's troops settle eight kilometers away from the Pass to rest for a few hours. They are awoken at midnight to continue marching.
- May 27: Battle of Shanhai Pass. At dawn Dorgon's main army reaches the gates of Shanhaiguan, where Dorgon receives Wu Sangui's formal surrender. The armies deploy for battle: placed in the vanguard, Wu's troops are ordered to charge the Shun army, but they are unable to break the rebels' line and suffer heavy casualties. By the late afternoon, they are on the verge of defeat when a sandstorm starts blowing on the battlefield. Dorgon chooses this moment to intervene: galloping around Wu's right flank, Qing bannermen destroys Li's left wing. The Shun army is defeated and retreats chaotically toward Yongping; thousands are massacred.
- May 28: Li Zicheng retreats from Yongping toward Beijing. Wu Sangui is named Prince Pingxi; his remaining troops shave their heads and join the Qing forces.
- May 31: Li Zicheng reenters Beijing with his troops, which started to loot the capital.
- June 3: as a "final gesture of defiance" after his decisive defeat at Shanhai Pass, Li Zicheng officially declares himself Emperor of the Great Shun at the Wuying dian 武英殿.
- June 4: after 42 days in Beijing, Li Zicheng sets the imperial palaces on fire and abandons the capital to flee toward the west. The Beijing population massacres rebels who had not fled; nearly two thousand are killed.
- June 5: led by Dorgon, Qing troops are welcomed into the capital; the Beijing population is shocked because it was expecting Wu Sangui to bring back the Ming heir apparent.
- June 7: Dorgon issues special proclamations to officials around the capital, assuring them that if the local population accepts to cut their hair and to surrender, the officials will be allowed to stay at their post. (See June 25.)
- June 25: because peasant rebellions quickly erupted around the capital in reaction to the haircutting order of June 7, Dorgon issues an edict saying that people will be allowed to arrange their hair the way they want.
- July 14: Dorgon declares Beijing (which he calls "Yanjing" 燕京) the new capital of the Qing. Mukden (present-day Shenyang), which had been the Qing capital since 1634, is retained as a secondary capital.
- July 29: at the request of his superior, German Jesuit missionary Johann Adam Schall von Bell petitions the Qing throne, claiming that the Jesuit calendar is more accurate than the other ones available.
- October 19: the six-year-old Emperor arrives in Beijing through the Zhengyang Gate, where he is welcomed by Dorgon.
- October 31: the Jesuit Johann Adam Schall von Bell is made Director of the Bureau of Astronomy (欽天監) after a test of the Jesuits' prediction for an eclipse on September 1 proved to be more accurate than those of the court's official astronomer.
- November 8: a formal ritual of imperial enthronement is held for Fulin, during which the merits of Dorgon as regent are compared to those of the Duke of Zhou. Dorgon's title is raised from "Prince Regent" to "Uncle Prince Regent" (Shufu shezheng wang 叔父攝政王), in which shufu (ecike in Manchu) represents a rank higher than that of imperial prince.
- November 11: Hooge is reinstated to the status of Prince Su; Dorgon's brother Ajige is named Prince Ying; Jirgalang is demoted from "Prince Regent" to "Assistant Uncle Prince Regent" (Fu zheng shuwang 輔政叔王).

=== 1645 ===
- January 20: the court orders that land without owners be reclaimed and given to Bannermen (圈地). In fact even land that has owners and occupants is confiscated. (Say more.)
- June 16: it is declared that all official documents will heretofore refer to Dorgon as "Imperial Uncle Prince Regent" (Huang shufu shezheng wang 皇叔父攝政王). Court ceremonies are also reformed to elevate Dorgon's ritual position even higher.
- June 17: the Prince of Fu, who had been reigning as the "Hongguang Emperor" since June of the previous year, is captured near Nanjing by Qing forces led by Liu Liangzuo.
- July 8: all people who submit to the Qing dynasty are ordered to shave their forehead and tie their hair into a queue. This "haircutting command" provokes widespread resistance among the Chinese population.
- July 29: Zhu Yujian, the Prince of Tang, is named Regent (or "Protector of the State" 監國).
- August 18: Zhu Yujian, the Prince of Tang, is proclaimed emperor less than a month after arriving in Fuzhou. He will reign under the title of Longwu 隆武.
- August 24: fall of Jiading to the forces of Li Chengdong, a former Ming general who was now serving the Qing; he orders a massacre of the entire population.
- September 22: Li Chengdong takes Songjiang.
- October 9: the city of Jiangyin falls to Qing armies led by Liu Liangzuo after a siege of 83 days. The entire population (about 100,000 victims) is massacred over the next two days.

=== 1646 ===
- September 29 and 30: hearing that Qing troops were approaching, the court of the Longwu Emperor leaves Yanping in western Fujian and tries to flee toward Ganzhou in Jiangxi.
- October 6: a Qing contingent catches up with the fleeing Longwu Emperor and executes him summarily.
- October 17 or 27: the Qing army captures Fuzhou unopposed.
- November 19: the Qing forbids officials to memorialize about five controversial issues: haircutting (剃髮), costume (衣冠), the seizure of lands (圈地), (投充), and runaway slaves (逃人).
- November 20: Zhu Youlang, the Ming Prince of Gui, is named protector of the state (監國) in Zhaoqing (Guangdong); it is decided that he will reign under the title Yongli 永曆.
- December 21: Zheng Zhilong, who had defended the Longwu court, surrenders to the Qing in Fuzhou. He is taken north as a prisoner.

=== 1647 ===
- February 1: Bandit leader Zhang Xianzhong is killed in battle by Qing troops led by Hooge, the son of Hong Taiji who had failed to succeed his father on the imperial throne in 1643.
- August 2: Dorgon's brother Dodo is named Prince Yu.
- September 7: The Qing court forbids Portuguese merchants based in Macao from entering the provinces to trade.
- September 28 / October 27 (SZ4.9): the court receives an embassy sent by the Ryukyu king to congratulate the Shunzhi Emperor on his accession.

=== 1648 ===
- February 25: Haoge (Prince Su) returns to the capital after his victorious but costly Sichuan campaign (see Feb. 1, 1647).
- March 29: Dorgon demotes Jirgalang from Prince Zheng to Prince of the second rank (郡王). He was given back his rank on May 25.
- April 5: Annam sends a tributary embassy to the Southern Ming.
- March 24 / April 22 (SZ5.3): Milayin and Ding Guodong rise against the Qing in Gansu.

=== 1649 ===
- April 29: prince Dodo (Dorgon's brother from the same mother) dies of smallpox in Beijing. Dorgon's other uterine brother Ajige is placed in charge of managing the affairs of the capital.
- May 27: Empress Dowager Xiaoduanwen, Hong Taiji's former empress, dies. As a result, the Shunzhi emperor's mother Empress Dowager Xiaozhuang becomes the most powerful woman in the palace.
- October 4: Qing banner troops take back Datong (Shanxi) from the hands of rebellious commander Jiang Xiang.
- December 30: Geng Zhongming (耿仲明; 1604–1649) commits suicide in Jiangxi after being accused of protecting subordinates who had helped three hundred runaway slaves to hide from their masters. His armies, now led by his son Geng Jimao (耿繼茂), nonetheless continue to fight the Southern Ming.

=== 1650 ===
- November 24: After a long siege, Qing armies led by Shang Kexi capture Canton and massacre its population. Firmly entrenched in the south, Shang later became one of the Three Feudatories.
- November 26: Kong Youde 孔有德 (1602–1652) captures Guilin (Guangxi) for the Qing.
- December 31: Dorgon dies at the age of 38 during a hunting expedition. His death created an immediate backlash against his political allies at court.

== Transition and personal rule ==
=== 1651 ===
- January 26: Dorgon's brother Ajige is imprisoned for allegedly plotting a coup after the death of Dorgon. He was forced to commit suicide later that year.
- April 7: the Shunzhi Emperor issues an edict declaring his intention to root out corruption among officials. The anticorruption campaign that followed first targeted officials who had been close to Dorgon, but it soon led to a revival of factional politics among literati officials, a problem that plagued the young emperor until his death in 1661.
- September: the emperor marries a niece of his mother the Empress Dowager.
- October 31: the monumental "Gate of Receiving Heaven" (Chengtian men 承天門) facing south from the imperial city is renamed "Gate of Heavenly Peace" (Tiananmen 天安門).
- December 13: Consort Ba 巴 gives birth to Niuniu 牛鈕, the Shunzhi emperor's first son.

=== 1652 ===
- March 9: death of the emperor's first son Niuniu less than three months after his birth.
- Spring: in an edict to the Inner Three Courts, the Shunzhi Emperor orders that all memorials concerning state matters should now be sent to him rather than to Jirgalang's office. This marks the time when the monarch takes full charge of the government.
- August 7: Southern Ming loyalist Li Dingguo, an ancient lieutenant of bandit king Zhang Xianzhong, retakes the key southwestern city of Guilin from the Qing; the Qing commander-in-chief Kong Youde commits suicide. Within a month, most of the Guangxi military commanders who had served the Qing reverted to the Ming side.

=== 1653 ===
- January 14: the Fifth Dalai Lama arrives in Beijing to meet with the Shunzhi Emperor. He leaves about two months later.
- April 25: the emperor recalls Feng Quan 馮銓 to serve in the government again. That very evening he was summoned to meet with the emperor, Hong Chengchou, and Chen Mingxia 陳名夏 to discuss the qualifications of Hanlin Academy compilers, who had been mostly appointed by Chen Mingxia, a southerner. Even though Shunzhi was trying to counteract the influence of southern Chinese officials who advocated a return to Ming government practices, by recalling a pro-Manchu collaborator like Feng Quan, he actually intensified the tensions between northern and southern Chinese literati.
- July 23: to counteract the power of the Imperial Household Department, Shunzhi establishes the Thirteen Offices (内十三衙门), which are controlled by eunuchs. These bureaus allowed eunuch power to grow; they were eliminated by Oboi and the other regents at the beginning of the Kangxi reign.
- September 8: Consort Ningyi 寧懿 of the Donggo clan gives birth to Fuquan, the emperor's second son. He died in 1703.
- December 15: The court forbids actors (優人) from not shaving their hair on the pretext that they have to play female roles.

=== 1654 ===
- March 8: Shang Kexi is appointed to govern 鎮 Guangdong, whereas Geng Jimao is ordered to garrison Guilin and to take care of the Green Standard Armies that had been established by Kong Youde.
- April 27: on recommendation by the Deliberative Council of Princes and Ministers led by Jirgalang, Chen Mingxia (陳名夏), who had been an influential Grand Secretary, is executed by strangling after a ten-day trial for corruption that started when he proposed to restore the hairstyle and court costume of the Ming dynasty.
- May 4: Empress Xiaohui gives birth to the emperor third son Xuanye 玄燁 (Manchu: ᡥᡳᠣᠸᠠᠨ ᠶᡝᡳ Hiowan Yei), who later became the Kangxi Emperor.

=== 1655 ===
- March 14: Jirgalang asks the Emperor to establish an Imperial Diarist 起居注官 to keep a diary of the emperor's movements.

=== 1656 ===
- August 6: The Qing forbids sea trade in the southeastern provinces. Private merchant ships are forbidden from trading and other ships from accosting. The purpose of this policy was to eliminate those among sea merchants who supported the Southern Ming power of Zheng Chenggong.

=== 1657 ===
- November 5: Imperial Noble Consort Donggo, the emperor's favorite consort, gives birth to the emperor's fourth son, who died before he was given a name (see February 25, 1658).
- November 30: the Shuntian examination cheating scandal erupts.
- December 8: the emperor's fifth son, Changning, is born to Consort Chen 陳. He became Prince Gong (恭親王) in 1671 and died in 1703.

=== 1658 ===
- February 25: death of the emperor's fourth son a little more than 100 days after his birth. He was posthumously granted the title of Prince Rong (榮親王).
- August 13: the emperor changes the old Manchu Inner Three Courts into a "Palace Secretariat" (diange 殿閣) and reinstitutes the old Hanlin Academy, both based on old Ming institutions. Though these institutions were abrogated during the Oboi regency (1661–1669), the Kangxi Emperor reinstated them in 1670 (the former as the "Grand Secretariat," or neige 內閣) and they lasted until the end of the Qing in 1911.

=== 1659 ===
- January 25: Qing forces led by prince Dodo's second son Doni enter the capital of Yunnan, sending the Yongli Emperor into flight to Burma under the protection of Li Dingguo.
- March 7: the core of the Southern Ming army is defeated at Dali, forcing the Yongli Emperor, the last monarch of the southern Ming, to flee toward Burma.

=== 1660 ===
- January 3: birth of the emperor's sixth son Qishou 奇授 (Manchu: Kišeo) to Consort Tang 唐. He died at an unspecified date at the age of seven suì.
- March 6: to counter factional politics, the Shunzhi emperor issues an edict banning clubs or societies whose purpose was to influence government affairs or public opinion.
- May 30: Consort Niu gives birth to the emperor's seventh son, Longxi 隆禧 (Manchu: Lunghi). He died in 1679.
- September 23: death of the emperor's favorite concubine, "Imperial Consort of the Second Rank" Donggo. Jesuit missionary Adam Schall, who had been close to the emperor in 1656 and 1657 and who attended the concubine's expensive funerals, later claimed that "Through her death she made [the emperor] fall into a madness more repulsive than the one of Salomon, because he openly displayed himself as a disciple of the Bonzes, shaving his head, and living and dressing himself like them."

=== 1661 ===
- January 23: birth of the emperor's eighth son, Yonggan, to Consort Muktu 穆克圖. He died at an unspecified date at the age of eight suì.
- February 5: the Shunzhi emperor dies of smallpox.

== After death ==
=== 1661 ===
- March 2: in a lavish procession, the emperor's body is transported to Jingshan—north of the Forbidden City—where it stayed for about two years until the emperor was finally buried. On March 3 a large number of precious goods are burned as offerings, after which the new emperor takes off his mourning dress.
- April 22: the dead emperor is given a temple name (Shizu 世祖)—by which he would be worshipped at the Imperial Ancestral Temple—and an honorific posthumous name (體天隆運定統建極英睿欽文顯武大德弘功至仁純孝章皇帝 Titian longyun dingtong jianji yingrui qinwen xianwu dade honggong zhiren chunxiao zhang huangdi).

=== 1662 ===
- January 13: the ancestral tablets of the Shunzhi emperor are placed at the Imperial Ancestral Temple, where he will be worshipped under the temple name Shizu.

=== 1663 ===
- July 5 / August 2 (KX2.6): the emperor's body is buried at the Xiaoling.

== Bibliography ==
- Dai, Yingcong (2009), The Sichuan Frontier and Tibet: Imperial Strategy in the Early Qing, Seattle and London: University of Washington Press, ISBN 978-0-295-98952-5.
- Dennerline, Jerry (2002), "The Shun-chih Reign", in Peterson, Willard J. (ed.), Cambridge History of China, Vol. 9, Part 1: The Ch'ing Dynasty to 1800, Cambridge: Cambridge University Press, pp. 73–119, ISBN 0-521-24334-3.
- Fang, Chao-ying (1943). "Fu-lin" . In Hummel, Arthur W. Sr. (ed.). Eminent Chinese of the Ch'ing Period. United States Government Printing Office. pp. 255–59.
- Gong, Baoli 宫宝利, ed. (2010), Shunzhi shidian 顺治事典 ["Events of the Shunzhi reign"] (in Chinese), Beijing: Zijincheng chubanshe 紫禁城出版社 ["Forbidden City Press"], ISBN 978-7-5134-0018-3.
- Li, Zhiting 李治亭, ed. (2003), Qingchao tongshi: Shunzhi fenjuan, 清朝通史: 順治分卷 ["General History of the Qing Dynasty: Shunzhi Volume"], Beijing: Zijincheng chubanshe 紫禁城出版社 ["Fordidden City Press"].
- Lui, Adam (1989), Two Rulers in One Reign: Dorgon and Shun-chih, 1644–1660, Canberra: Faculty of Asian Studies, Australian National University, ISBN 0731506545.
- Naquin, Susan (2000), Peking: Temples and City Life, 1400–1900, Berkeley and Los Angeles: University of California Press, ISBN 0-520-21991-0.
- Oxnam, Robert B. (1975), Ruling from Horseback: Manchu Politics in the Oboi Regency, 1661–1669, Chicago and London: University of Chicago Press.
- Qingshi gao 清史稿 ["Draft History of the Qing"]. Edited by Zhao Erxun 趙爾巽 et al. Completed in 1927. Citing from 1976 to 1977 edition by Beijing: Zhonghua shuju, in 48 volumes with continuous pagination.
- Rawski, Evelyn S. (1998), The Last Emperors: A Social History of Qing Imperial Institutions, Berkeley, Los Angeles, and London: University of California Press, ISBN 9780520926790.
- Standaert, Nicolas (2008), The Interweaving of Rituals: Funerals in the Cultural Exchange Between China and Europe, Seattle: University of Washington Press, ISBN 978-0-295-98810-8.
- Struve, Lynn A. (1982), "The Hsü Brothers and Semiofficial Patronage of Scholars in the K'ang-hsi Period", Journal of Asian Studies, 42 (1): 231–66, doi:10.2307/2719125, JSTOR 2719125.
- Struve, Lynn (1988), "The Southern Ming", in Frederic W. Mote; Denis Twitchett; John King Fairbank (eds.), Cambridge History of China, Volume 7, The Ming Dynasty, 1368–1644, Cambridge: Cambridge University Press, pp. 641–725, ISBN 0-521-24332-7.
- Wakeman, Frederic (1975), "Localism and Loyalism During the Ch'ing Conquest of Kiangnan: The Tragedy of Chiang-yin", in Frederic Wakeman Jr.; Carolyn Grant (eds.), Conflict and Control in Late Imperial China, Berkeley: Center of Chinese Studies, University of California, Berkeley, pp. 43–85, ISBN 0-520-02597-0.
- Wakeman, Frederic (1985), The Great Enterprise: The Manchu Reconstruction of Imperial Order in Seventeenth-Century China, Berkeley, Los Angeles, and London: University of California Press 2 volumes.
