= 1644 in China =

- Decades: 1620s; 1630s; 1640s; 1650s; 1660s
- See also: Other events of 1644; History of China • Timeline • Years

Events from the year 1644 in China.

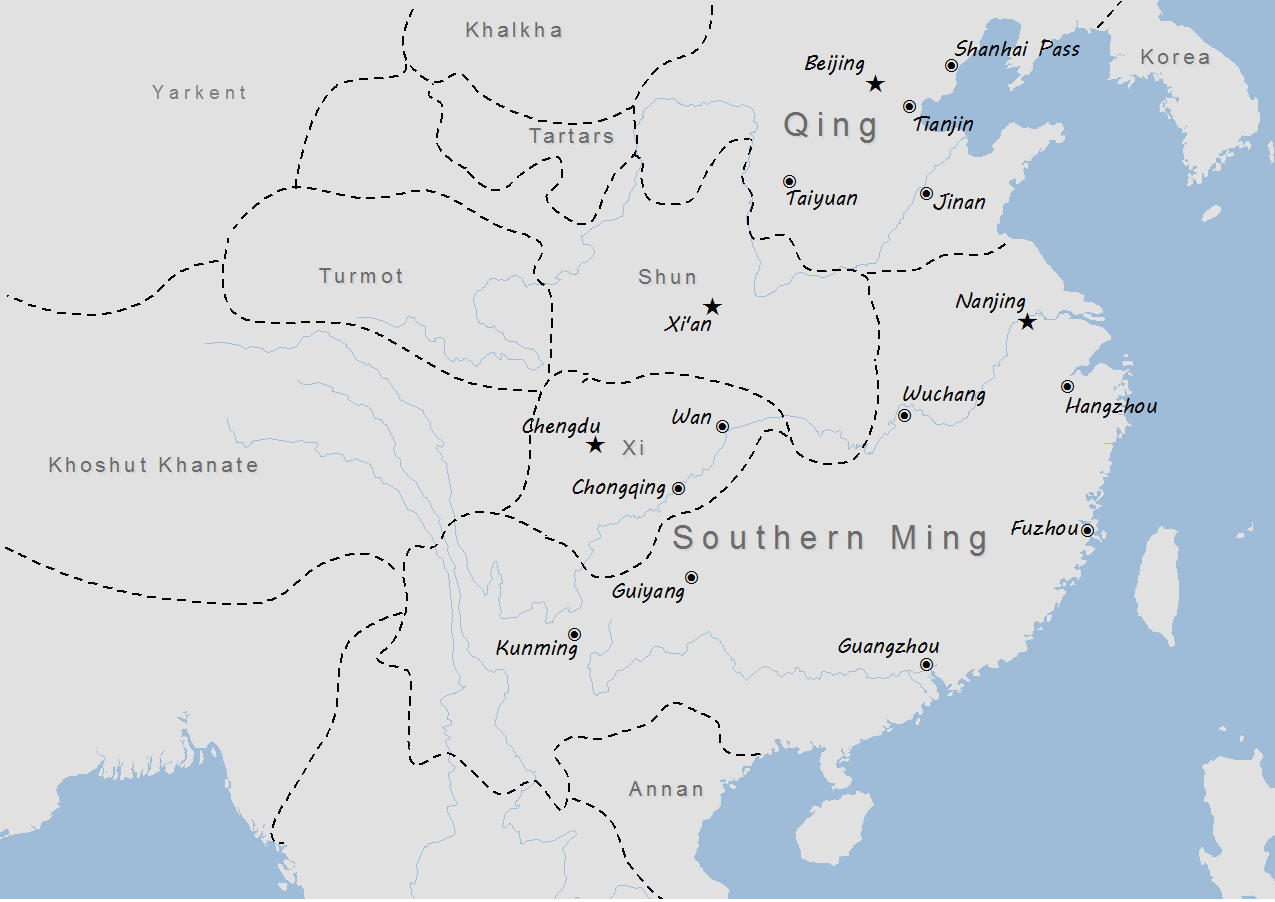
Chinese political situation in 1644.

== Incumbents ==
- Ming dynasty – Chongzhen Emperor
- Southern Ming - Hongguang Emperor
- Qing dynasty – Shunzhi Emperor
  - Co-regent: Dorgon
  - Co-regent: Jirgalang
- Shun dynasty – Li Zicheng

== Events ==
- Transition from Ming to Qing
  - February and April 1644 - Battle of Beijing fought between forces of the Ming Dynasty and rebel forces led by Li Zicheng
  - May 27 - Battle of Shanhai Pass

== Births ==
- Yang Jin (楊晉 ca. (1644-1728) was a Chinese painter

== Deaths ==
- Chongzhen Emperor, committed suicide
