= Hu Zhaoxi =

Chinese historian (1933–2019)

Hu Zhaoxi (Chinese: 胡昭曦; February 1933 – 3 November 2019) was a Chinese historian who specialized in the history of Sichuan and the history of the Song dynasty. He was a professor at Sichuan University, where he served as Dean of the Graduate School, Director of the Sichuan University Library, and President of the Institute of Humanities and Social Sciences.

== Life and career ==
Hu Zhaoxi was born in February 1933 in Zigong, Sichuan, Republic of China. He studied at Xuchuan High School (旭川中学) in Zigong. From 1951 to 1956, he worked in the Zigong Committee of the Communist Youth League of China .

In September 1956, Hu enrolled in the Department of History of Sichuan University. In 1961, he graduated, becoming a faculty member. In 1987, he became a full professor. He was Dean of the Graduate School, Director of the Sichuan University Library, President of the university's Institute of Humanities and Social Sciences. In 1992, he was awarded a special pension by the State Council of China for distinguished scholars. He supervised more than 20 masters and doctoral students. He retired in May 2003.

Hu died on 3 November 2019 at the West China Medical Center of Sichuan University in Chengdu, aged 86.

== Publications ==
Hu was known for his research on the history of the Song dynasty and the history of Sichuan. He published 16 books, including History of Song–Mongol (Yuan) Relations (宋蒙 (元) 关系史), Sichuan Studies During the Song Dynasty (宋代蜀学研究), A Study of the Rebellion of Wang Xiaobo and Li Shun (王小波李顺起义考述), A Study of Zhang Xianzhong's Sichuan Massacre (张献忠屠蜀考辨). He also published more than 150 research papers, some of which are collected in the book Hu Zhaoxi's Collected Papers on the History of the Song Dynasty (胡昭曦宋史论集).

Hu is most influential in public for his revisionist history of Zhang Xianzhong's massacres in Sichuan. Hu's work is part of an academic current that portrays Zhang's rebellion as a proletarian revolution, a view that prevailed in the PRC from the 1970s. Some scholars, particularly those not based in the People's Republic of China, have criticized Hu's work as denialism, especially for his outright rejection of primary sources that indicate high civilian casualties during Zhang's rule, with the rationale that these sources reflect landlords' views.
