= Quzi, Qingyang =

Quzi 曲子镇
- Town
- Location within China Location within Gansu
- Coordinates: 36.29°N 107.51°E

Area
  - Total: 396.2 km^{2} (153.0 sq mi)

Population (2010)
  - Total: 23,622
  - Density: 59.62/km^{2} (154.4/sq mi)

Quzi is a town of Huanxian, Qingyang, Gansu, China. In 2010 the population was 23,622.

Archeological finds showed human inhabitation dating back to the Paleolithic and Neolithic in the town's area. The town was founded during the start of the Yongle Emperor reign (14th century). It was rebuilt in the 16th year of the Shunzhi Emperor reign (17th century).

In 1933, during the Republic of China era, it was the capital of Huanxian. On 1 June 1936, the battle of Quzi took place, during which the 105th Brigade of the Kuomintang Army failed to defend the old fortified town of Quzi against the Red Army's Second and Fifth Regiment.

In 1936, under communist rule, it was the capital of Quzi County. In 1950 Quzi administratively became a township, in 1985 it received town status.

The local culture is notable for its folk culture including playing the pipa and shadow play.

The oil industry is in important part of the local economy, employing 2,300 people.
