= Xiangqishan Village =

Xiangqishan Village 象棋山村
- Country: China
- Province: Hubei
- Prefecture-level city: Huanggang
- County-level city: Macheng
- Postal code: 438000
- Area code: 0713

Xiangqishan Village (Chinese: 象棋山村), literally "Elephant Chess Mountain Village", is an administrative village under the jurisdiction of Fuzihe Town, Macheng City, Huanggang City, Hubei Province, China. The grassroots mass autonomous organization in which the village is located is the Xiangqishan Villagers' Committee, whose urban-rural classification code is 220.
