= Huan County =

Huan County 环县
- County
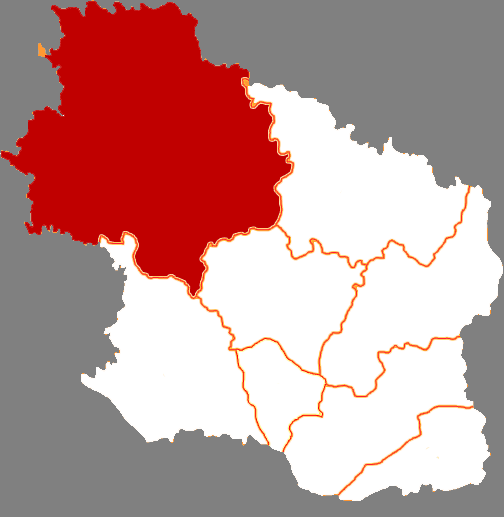
- Huan in Qingyang

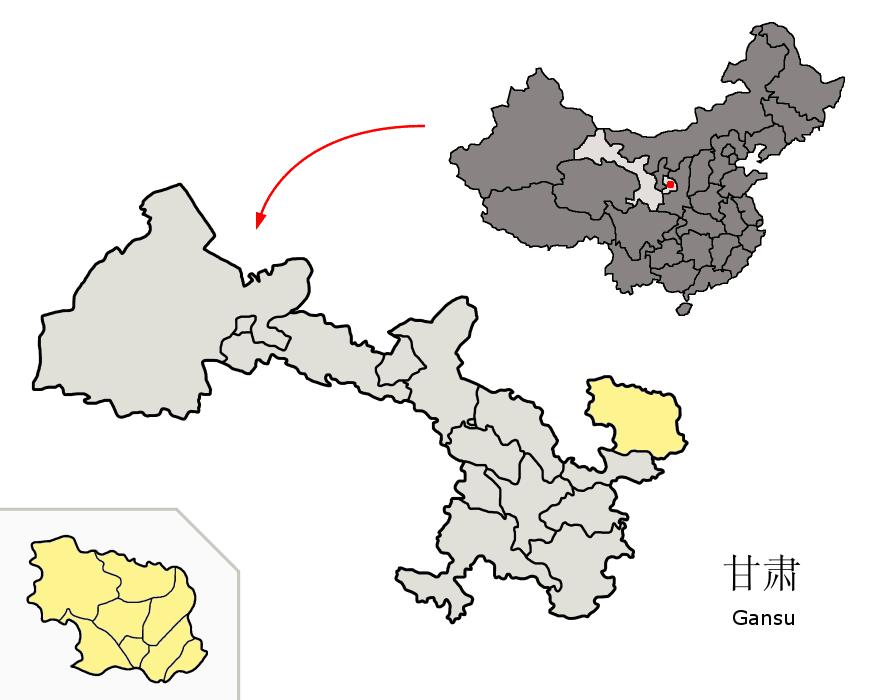
- Qingyang in Gansu
- Coordinates: 36°34′06″N 107°18′31″E
- Country: China
- Province: Gansu
- Prefecture-level city: Qingyang
- County seat: Huancheng

Area
  - County: 9,236 km^{2} (3,566 sq mi)
- Highest elevation: 2,089 m (6,854 ft)
- Lowest elevation: 1,200 m (3,900 ft)

Population (2019)
  - County: 316,703
  - Density: 34.29/km^{2} (88.81/sq mi)
  - Urban: 60,600
  - Rural: 304,400
- Time zone: UTC+8 (China Standard)
- Postal code: 745700
- Website: www.huanxian.gov.cn

Huan County or Huanxian (simplified Chinese: 环县; traditional Chinese: 環縣; pinyin: Huán Xiàn) is an administrative district in eastern Gansu province, China at the junction of three provinces: Gansu, Shaanxi to the northeast, and Ningxia to the west and northwest. It is under the administration of the prefecture-level city of Qingyang.

Its postal code is 745700, and the population in 2019 was 316,703.

Huanxian is known as one of the first places in China where agriculture was practiced. It was part of ancient Yongzhou. In 994 it was known as Huanzhou. In 1369 it became known as Huanxian. In 1669 Huanxian and the governing Qingyang were transferred from Shaanxi to Gansu.

== Administrative divisions ==
Huan County is divided to 10 towns, 10 townships and 1 other.

Towns

- Huancheng (环城镇)
- Quzi (曲子镇)
- Tianshui (甜水镇)
- Mubo (木钵镇)
- Hongde (洪德镇)
- Hedao (合道镇)
- Hudong (虎洞镇)
- Maojing (毛井镇)
- Fanjiachuan (樊家川镇)
- Chedao (车道镇)

Townships

- Tianchi Township (天池乡)
- Yanwu Township (演武乡)
- Bazhu Township (八珠乡)
- Gengwan Township (耿湾乡)
- Qintuanzhuang Township (秦团庄乡)
- Shancheng Township (山城乡)
- Nanqiu Township (南湫乡)
- Luoshanchuan Township (罗山川乡)
- Xiaonangou Township (小南沟乡)
- Lujiawan Township (芦家湾乡)

Others

- Siheyuan Tourism Development Office

== Climate ==
Climate data for Huanxian, elevation 1,256 m (4,121 ft), (1991–2020 normals, extremes 1981–2010)
Month	Jan	Feb	Mar	Apr	May	Jun	Jul	Aug	Sep	Oct	Nov	Dec	Year
Record high °C (°F)	13.1 (55.6)	18.8 (65.8)	27.8 (82.0)	35.1 (95.2)	35.1 (95.2)	37.1 (98.8)	38.6 (101.5)	35.0 (95.0)	34.8 (94.6)	28.1 (82.6)	22.4 (72.3)	15.8 (60.4)	38.6 (101.5)
Mean daily maximum °C (°F)	1.9 (35.4)	6.0 (42.8)	12.4 (54.3)	19.5 (67.1)	24.2 (75.6)	28.3 (82.9)	29.5 (85.1)	27.3 (81.1)	22.1 (71.8)	16.2 (61.2)	9.6 (49.3)	3.5 (38.3)	16.7 (62.1)
Daily mean °C (°F)	−5.7 (21.7)	−1.5 (29.3)	4.9 (40.8)	11.7 (53.1)	16.8 (62.2)	21.1 (70.0)	23.0 (73.4)	21.1 (70.0)	15.9 (60.6)	9.2 (48.6)	2.3 (36.1)	−4.1 (24.6)	9.6 (49.2)
Mean daily minimum °C (°F)	−11.5 (11.3)	−7.3 (18.9)	−1.2 (29.8)	4.9 (40.8)	9.9 (49.8)	14.6 (58.3)	17.6 (63.7)	16.3 (61.3)	11.3 (52.3)	4.2 (39.6)	−3.1 (26.4)	−9.6 (14.7)	3.8 (38.9)
Record low °C (°F)	−24.9 (−12.8)	−22.3 (−8.1)	−16.5 (2.3)	−6.6 (20.1)	−1.5 (29.3)	6.2 (43.2)	10.4 (50.7)	6.2 (43.2)	0.5 (32.9)	−9.3 (15.3)	−17.1 (1.2)	−25.1 (−13.2)	−25.1 (−13.2)
Average precipitation mm (inches)	3.0 (0.12)	4.1 (0.16)	9.8 (0.39)	24.7 (0.97)	38.5 (1.52)	55.0 (2.17)	92.2 (3.63)	97.2 (3.83)	63.5 (2.50)	31.5 (1.24)	11.1 (0.44)	1.8 (0.07)	432.4 (17.04)
Average precipitation days (≥ 0.1 mm)	3.0	3.4	4.5	6.1	7.2	8.6	11.1	11.5	10.0	6.9	3.7	1.7	77.7
Average snowy days	4.5	4.4	3.4	0.7	0	0	0	0	0	0.7	2.7	3.0	19.4
Average relative humidity (%)	53	51	48	46	49	54	64	71	74	70	62	54	58
Mean monthly sunshine hours	200.5	186.8	216.2	238.9	259.3	254.4	244.1	220.9	174.4	185.1	189.6	202.6	2,572.8
Percentage possible sunshine	65	60	58	60	59	58	55	53	47	54	62	68	58
Source: China Meteorological Administration

== Economy ==
Huanxian has extensive coal resources and is home to the Changqing Oilfield. Several wind farms have also been constructed in Huanxian. It is also an important agricultural base for grains.

The county is considered poor, due to the arid climate making agriculture difficult, and the mountainous terrain hindering transport.

== Tourism ==
Parts of the Qin Great Wall are located in the south of Huanxian.

== Culture ==
Huanxian food specialities include lamb meat, Huangjiu, buckwheat noodles, and Yanmian Rourou noodles (Chinese: 燕面柔柔).

Huanxian is also known for its shadow play, which has been listed by UNESCO as intangible cultural heritage. It is called the home of shadow theatre in China.

== Transportation ==
- China National Highway 211
- China National Highway 341 (under construction)
- G69 Yinchuan–Baise Expressway
- Yinchuan–Xi'an high-speed railway

== See also ==
- List of administrative divisions of Gansu
