= Macheng North railway station =

Railway station in Nanping, Fujian

Macheng North 麻城北
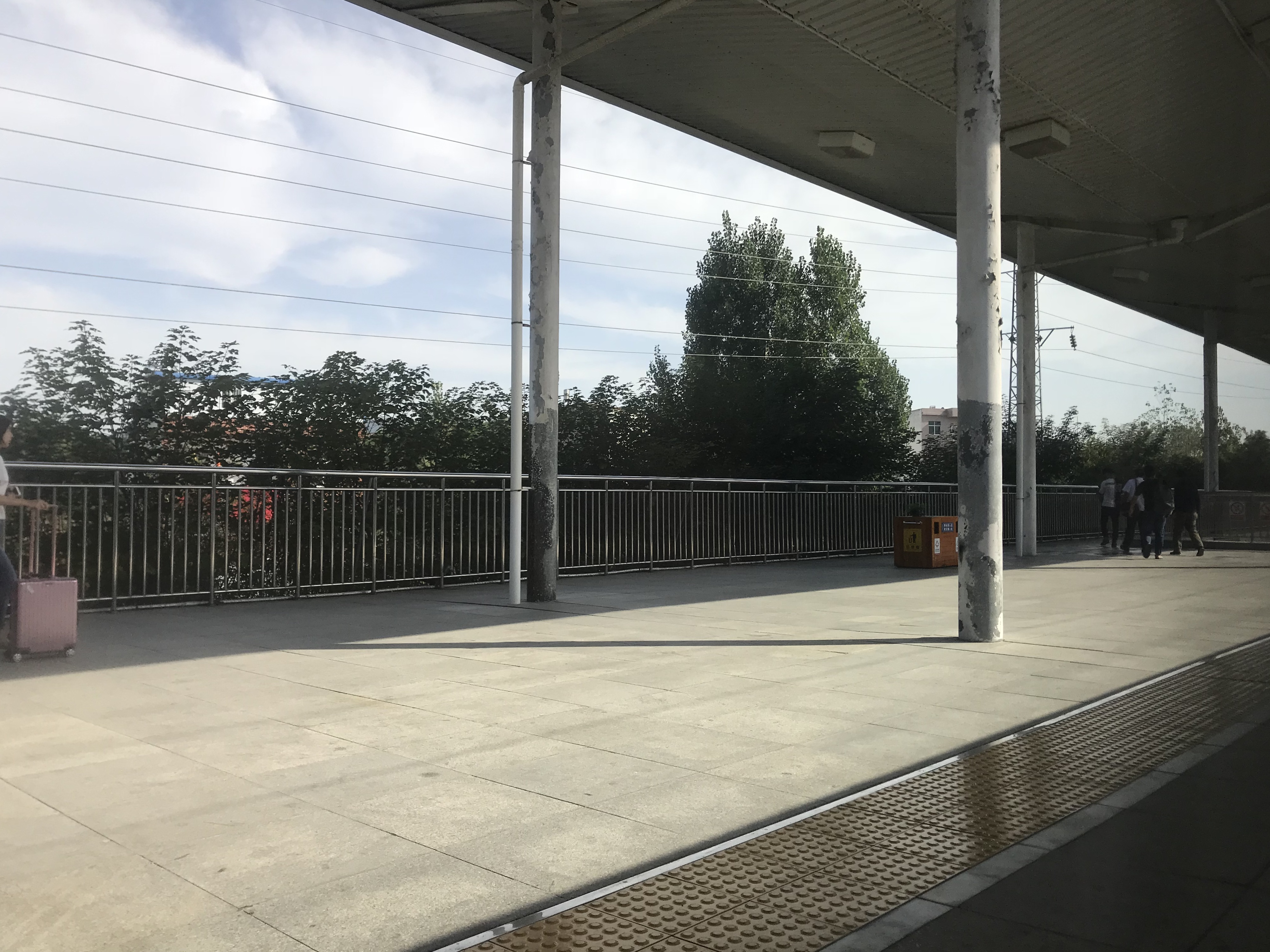

General information
- Location: Macheng, Huanggang, Hubei; China
- Coordinates: 31°37′39.14″N 115°58′13.42″E
- Line: Hefei–Wuhan railway

History
- Opened: 1 April 2009
Location

Macheng North railway station (Chinese: 麻城北站) is a railway station in Macheng, Huanggang, Hubei, China.

== History ==
Construction on the station began in October 2005. The station opened on 1 April 2009. The initial service level was four trains each way per day.

Preceding station	China Railway High-speed	Following station
Jinzhai towards Hefei South	Hefei–Wuhan railway	Hong'an West towards Hankou
