= Chen Mingxia =

Qing dynasty politician

Chen Mingxia 陳名夏

Grand Secretary of the Palace Secretariat Academy
- In office 1653–1654

Grand Secretary of the Palace Academy for the Advancement of Literature
- In office 1651–1652

Minister of Personnel
- In office 1 September 1648 – 1 October 1651 Serving with Tambai (until 1650), Handai (1651), Tantai (1651), Chentai (1651), Jumara (since 1651), Jolo (since 1651)
- Preceded by: Tambai
- Succeeded by: Gao Eryan

Personal details
- Born: c. 1601 Liyang, Ming China
- Died: 1654 Beijing, Qing China

Chen Mingxia
- Traditional Chinese: 陳名夏
- Simplified Chinese: 陈名夏
Transcriptions
Standard Mandarin
- Hanyu Pinyin: Chén Míngxià
- Wade–Giles: Ch'en^{2} Ming^{2}-hsia^{4}

Chen Mingxia (c. 1601–1654) was Grand Secretariat and President of Ministry Personnel of the Qing dynasty. He was from Liyang in Jiangsu and was a Chinese official during the Shunzhi period (1644–1661) of the Qing dynasty (1644–1912). Before joining the Qing in early 1645, he had successively served the Ming dynasty (1368–1644) and the short-lived Shun regime of rebel leader Li Zicheng (1602–1645). He then served in the highest ranks of the Qing bureaucracy, being promoted to Grand Secretariat of the empire.

== Ming period ==
A member of the reformist Restoration Society (Fushe 復社), Chen finished first in the metropolitan examination and third in the subsequent palace examination of 1643, the last such exam held by the Ming dynasty (1368–1644). Along with other graduates who showed special literary promise, he became Hanlin bachelor, and was given a concurrent post of supervising secretary in the Ministry of War. On 13 April 1644, during an audience with the Chongzhen Emperor, he advised the monarch to summon the braves of Shandong to defend Beijing against approaching rebel troops led by Li Zicheng.

When the capital fell to Li Zicheng's armies on 24 April, Chen nearly died but was saved by his family. He then served in Li's administration for a few weeks until Li was crushed in the Battle of Shanhai Pass in early June by the allied troops of the Manchu Dorgon, Prince Regent of the Qing dynasty, and Wu Sangui, a Ming general who let the Qing army enter the North China plain through Shanhai Pass. Dorgon entered Beijing victorious on 5 June 1644.

In June 1644, Chen fled Beijing and went home. The Ming loyalist government established in Nanjing around a Ming imperial prince named Zhu Yousong then tried to hunt down Chen because Chen had served in Li's regime: indictments issued against him and other turncoats forced Chen to flee again, this time disguised as a Buddhist monk. In early 1645, after a few months of traveling, Chen finally decided to join the Qing government.

== Qing period ==
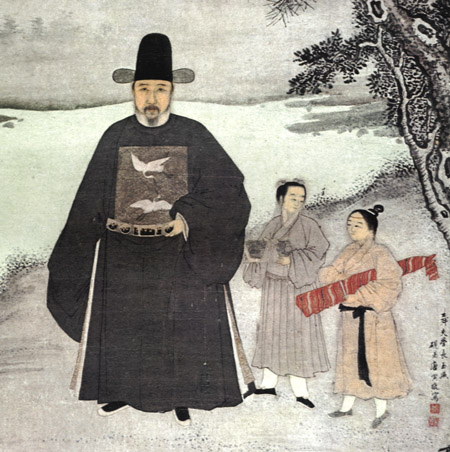
Court dress was a controversial topic during the early Qing dynasty (1644–1912). Chen Mingxia advocated returning to Ming court dress, an example of which is shown in this 15th-century painting.

Like all Qing officials, Chen had to shave his forehead, arrange his hair into a queue like the Manchus, and adopt the Qing court dress, which featured smaller sleeves and a shorter sash than the Ming court style, as befitted the status of the Manchus as horseback-riding warriors.

Chen immediately made a good impression on regent Dorgon when he advised Dorgon to replace the young Fulin—who had just been enthroned as the Shunzhi Emperor in late 1644—as Emperor of China. Dorgon named Chen Vice-President of the Ministry of Personnel, a position that Chen used to name fellow Southern Chinese to important government positions. He became identified as the leader of the southern faction, whereas Feng Quan (馮銓; 1595–1672) was the leader of the so-called "northern faction".

After Dorgon's death on 31 December 1650, the Shunzhi Emperor (r. 1643–61) started to rule personally and announced his intention to purge corruption from officialdom. He dismissed Feng Quan from his post of grand secretary and replaced him with Chen Mingxia, who by then had become President of the Ministry of Personnel. Though later in 1651 Chen was also dismissed on charges of influence peddling, he was reinstated in his post in 1653 and soon became a close personal advisor to the sovereign. He was even allowed to draft imperial edicts just as Ming grand secretaries used to. While in his high position at court, Chen was among the many officials who tried to sway famous southern scholar Wu Weiye (1609–1671) into serving the Qing, which Wu agreed to doing in 1653.

Still in 1653, the Shunzhi Emperor decided to recall the disgraced Feng Quan, but instead of balancing the influence of northern and southern Chinese officials at court as the emperor had intended, Feng Quan's return only intensified factional strife. In several controversies at court in 1653 and 1654, the southerners formed one bloc opposed to the northerners and the Manchus. In April 1654, when Chen, a southerner, spoke to northern official Ning Wanwo (寧完我; d. 1665) about restoring Ming court robes and hairstyle, Ning immediately denounced him to the emperor, claiming that his plan to restore Ming official dress was a plot to sap the new dynasty's military strength. Ning also accused him of various crimes including bribe-taking, nepotism, factionalism, and usurping imperial prerogatives. Found guilty, he was executed by strangulation on 27 April 1654.

== Bibliography ==
- Dennerline, Jerry (2002), "The Shun-chih Reign", in Peterson, Willard J. (ed.), Cambridge History of China, Vol. 9, Part 1: The Ch'ing Dynasty to 1800, Cambridge: Cambridge University Press, pp. 73–119, ISBN 0-521-24334-3.
- Fang, Chao-ying (1943). "Ch'ên Ming-hsia" . In Hummel, Arthur W. Sr. (ed.). Eminent Chinese of the Ch'ing Period. United States Government Printing Office. p. 95..
- Godley, Michael R. (2011) [1994], "The end of the queue: hair as symbol in Chinese history", China Heritage Quarterly, 27. Originally published electronically in East Asian History, 8 (1994): 53–72.
- Hucker, Charles O. (1985), A Dictionary of Official Titles in Imperial China, Stanford: Stanford University Press, ISBN 0-8047-1193-3.
- I, Songgyu [李成珪]; Fogel, Joshua A. (1981), "Shantung in the Shun-chih Reign: The Establishment of Local Control and the Gentry Response", Ch'ing-Shih Wen-T'i, 4 (5): 1–31 – via Project MUSE (subscription required)
- Struve, Lynn (1988), "The Southern Ming", in Frederic W. Mote; Denis Twitchett; John King Fairbank (eds.), Cambridge History of China, Volume 7, The Ming Dynasty, 1368–1644, Part 1, Cambridge: Cambridge University Press, pp. 641–725.
- Wakeman, Frederic (1984), "Romantics, Stoics, and Martyrs in Seventeenth-Century China", Journal of Asian Studies, 43 (4): 631–68, doi:10.2307/2057148, JSTOR 2057148, S2CID 163314256 (subscription required).
- ——— (1985), The Great Enterprise: The Manchu Reconstruction of Imperial Order in Seventeenth-Century China, Berkeley, Los Angeles, and London: University of California Press, ISBN 0-520-04804-0. 2 volumes.
