= Xi dynasty =

Chinese imperial dynasty from 1643 to 1647

Great Xi 大西
- 1643–1647
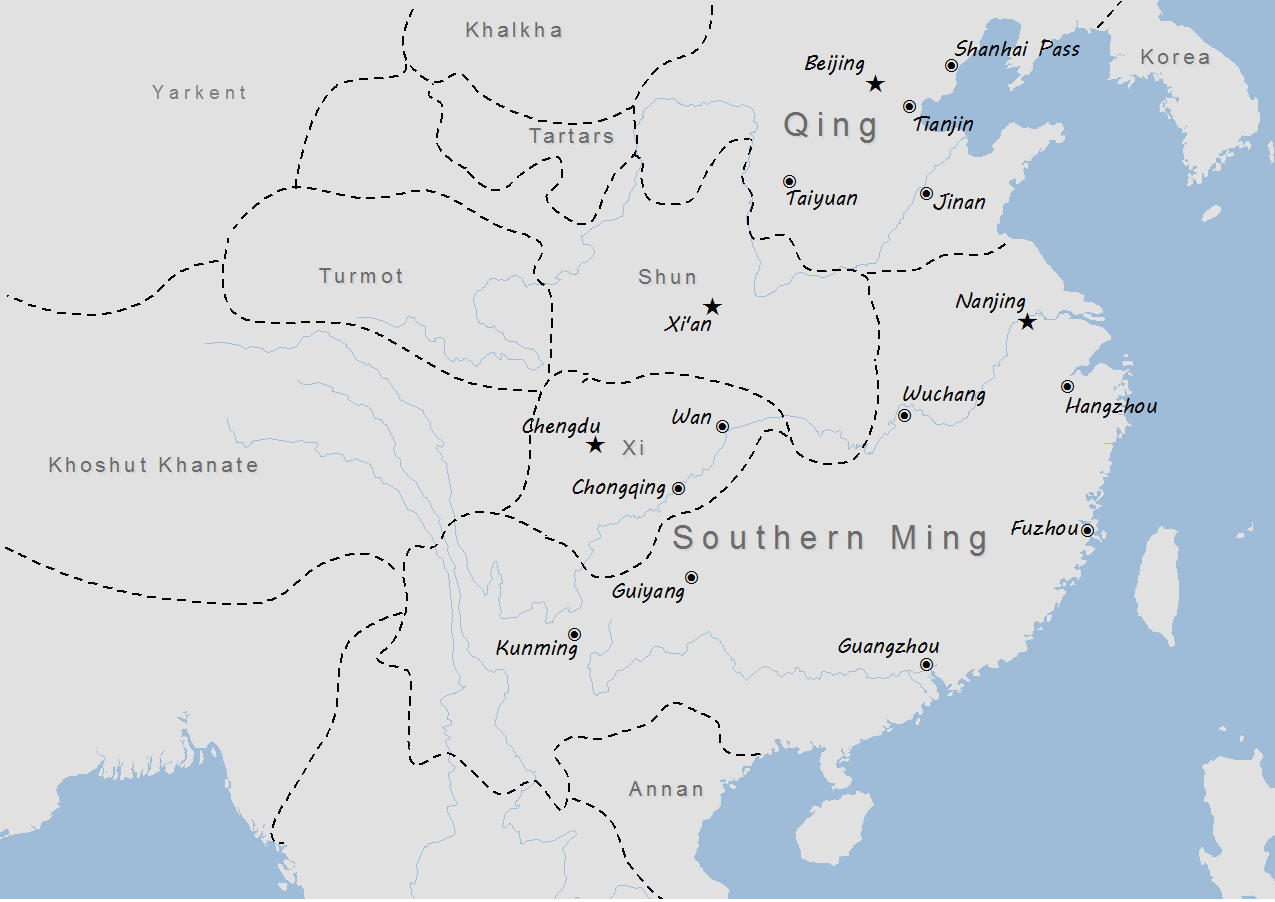
- The Xi dynasty during the Ming–Qing transition
- Capital: Huangzhou (1643); Chengdu (1644–1647)
- Common languages: Chinese
- Religion: Buddhism; Taoism; Confucianism; Chinese folk religion
- Government: Monarchy
- Sovereign
  - 1643–1647: Zhang Xianzhong
- History
  - Proclamation as King: 1643
  - Proclamation as Emperor: 1644
  - Abolishment: 1647
- Currency: Chinese coin, Chinese cash
Preceded by	Succeeded by
Ming dynasty	Qing dynasty; Southern Ming

The Xi dynasty (/ʃi/ SHEE; Chinese: 西朝; pinyin: Xī cháo), officially the Great Xi (大西; Dà Xī), was a short-lived imperial dynasty of China that existed during the Ming–Qing transition from 1643 to 1647. The dynasty was established by the peasant rebel leader Zhang Xianzhong, by proclaiming himself king and later emperor of the Xi dynasty, similar to the contemporary Shun dynasty established by another rebellion leader Li Zicheng. The Xi dynasty was based at Chengdu since 1644 with the era name "Dashun" (大順, "Great Shun") and ruled most of Sichuan province, after Zhang Xianzhong seized the control of the province from the late Ming dynasty. The regime's brief existence was followed by the devastation and depopulation of Sichuan, though Zhang's responsibility for this is still debated. The dynasty ended in 1647 after the death of Zhang Xianzhong, and its territory fell to the forces of the Southern Ming and the Manchu-led Qing dynasty.

== Emperor ==
Personal name	Period of reign	Era names and dates
Zhang Xianzhong	1643–1647	Dashun (大顺; Dà Shùn; 'Great Shun') 1644–1647

== See also ==
- Shun dynasty
- Qing dynasty
- Southern Ming
- Late Ming peasant rebellions
