= Zhang Xianzhong =

Chinese peasant leader and ruler in Sichuan (1606–1647)

Zhang Xianzhong 張獻忠
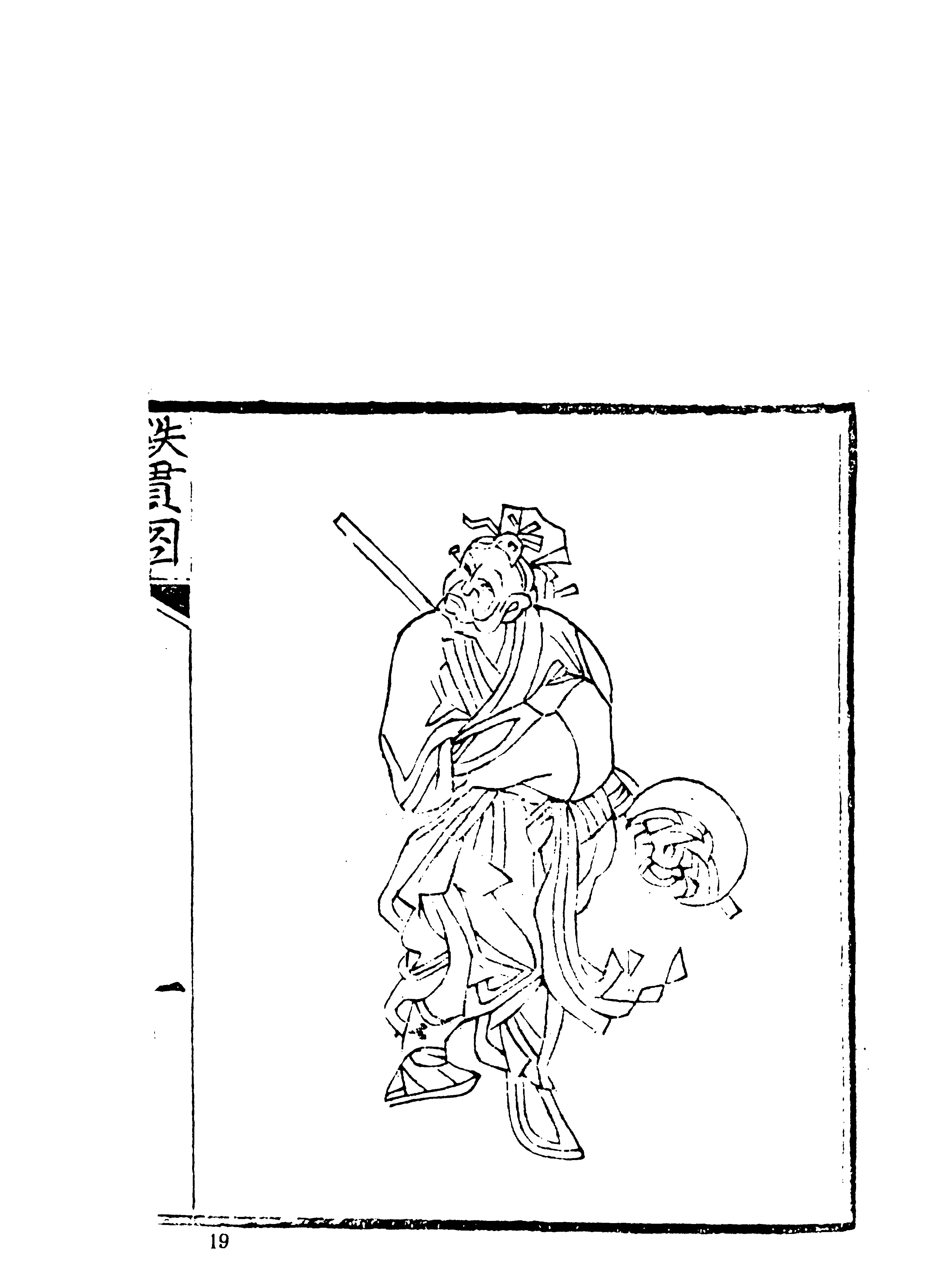
- Zhang Xianzhong as depicted in Tieguan Tu (铁冠图; The Illustrated Iron Crown)

Emperor of the Xi dynasty
- Reign: 1644–1647
- Born: 18 September 1606
- Died: 2 January 1647 (aged 40)
- Spouse: Lady Chen (daughter of Chen Yan)
Names
- Zhang Xianzhong (張獻忠)
Era name and dates
- Dashun (大順): 1644–1647
Posthumous name
- Emperor Gao (高皇帝)
Temple name
- Taizu (太祖)
- Dynasty: Xi
- Seal (Note: Alleged imprint of Zhang Xianzhong's treasure seal as Xi Wang (西王之宝, Xī Wáng Zhībǎo; "Seal of the King of the West"))

Zhang Xianzhong
- Traditional Chinese: 張獻忠
- Simplified Chinese: 张献忠
Transcriptions
Standard Mandarin
- Hanyu Pinyin: Zhāng Xiànzhōng
- Wade–Giles: Chang Hsien-chung

Zhang Xianzhong (張獻忠 or Chang Hsien-chung; 18 September 1606 – 2 January 1647), courtesy name Bingwu (秉吾), art name Jingxuan (敬軒), was a Chinese peasant leader who led a peasant rebellion from Yan'an wei, Shaanxi (today Yulin, Shaanxi province) during the Ming-Qing transition. He conquered Sichuan in 1644, and named himself king and later emperor of the Xi dynasty. His rule in Sichuan was brief, and he was killed by the invading Qing army. He is commonly associated with the massacres in Sichuan that depopulated the region. However, the extent of his killings is disputed.

== Biography ==
=== Early life ===
Zhang was born in Liushujian (柳树涧; literally 'willow spring', modern Dingbian, Shaanxi province), in 1606 into a poor family. He was described as tall in stature, had a yellow complexion and a "tiger chin" (虎頷, meaning an impressive beard), and hence was given the nickname "Yellow Tiger". In the mid-1620s, he enlisted in the Ming army. He was sentenced to death for breaching military law. He was reprieved after a senior officer intervened, impressed by Zhang's demeanour.

=== As rebel leader ===
Towards the end of the Ming dynasty, drought, famines and epidemics broke out in various parts of China. In the late 1620s, peasants revolted in Shaanxi, resisting attempts by the Ming government to collect grains and taxes. They coalesced into rebel armies called "roving bandits" (liúkòu 流寇) because of their highly mobile nature, and spread into other parts of China. Zhang deserted from the army around 1630, joined the rebel forces in Mizhi County, and established himself as a rebel leader with a few hundred followers, styling himself Bada Wang (八大王, Eighth Great King). Among his followers was his adopted son Li Dingguo. His mobile forces would conduct raids along the western edge of Shaanxi, plundering swiftly and hiding out in the hills. Later he moved into other provinces, moving from place to place raiding towns and cities. He made forays into Sichuan by the late 1633 but was repelled by Qin Liangyu. He was also defeated at various times by the Ming forces; Zhang would also surrender when it was expedient for him to do so, for example in 1631 and 1638, but would then later regroup and resume the rebellion.

In 1635, Zhang joined a larger confederation of bandits with other rebel leaders including Li Zicheng (Li would later capture Beijing and end Ming rule there). They devastated Henan and pushed into Anhui. After they had burnt the Ming ancestral temple at Zhongdu (Fengyang) in Anhui and ravaged the area, the rebel armies broke up and Zhang headed to Huguang (now Hubei). He failed to subdue the city of Luzhou, but captured Xiangyang with 70,000 men under his command the following year in 1636. In 1637, joined by other rebels and with an army now reaching a size of 300,000 men, he again pushed into Anhui, then to Jiangsu to capture Suzhou, and almost down to Nanjing, auxiliary capital of Ming. But he was immediately defeated there and he retreated to Huguang. He besieged Chengdu in 1637 but failed to take it. In 1638, Zhang was injured in a battle in Huguang with Ming general Zuo Liangyu, and he then surrendered to Ming supreme commander Xiong Wencan (熊文燦) who believed in peaceful suasion, and was allowed to settle in Gucheng and serve as a regional Ming commander. However, he reneged on the agreement in early 1639 and rebelled, killing the local prefect and burning the town. He then ambushed and inflicted heavy losses to the Ming forces led by the Ming general Zuo Liangyu. In 1640, he suffered a defeat at the hand of Zuo at Mount Manao in Sichuan, and was forced to flee with his few remaining followers to hide in the mountains of Eastern Sichuan for a few months.

Zhang gathered the remnants of his forces, and continued with his raids which Ming commander Yang Sichang found hard to contain. In 1641, he emerged from Sichuan and attacked Xiangyang, capturing and executing the imperial Prince of Xiang there. Zhang's army swelled as he took a number of towns and cities such as Sucheng, Luzhou and Tongcheng, and declined when he suffered setbacks at the hands of Ming generals Zuo Liangyu. In 1643, he took Macheng in Huguang, and his army swelled to some 57,000 after incorporating the city's rebels. He then captured the provincial capital of Wuchang, killed the imperial prince there, and proclaimed himself "Xi Wang" (King of the West). He attempted to set up a government in Wuchang, but abandoned the city after two months when Ming forces gathered strength, and captured Wuchang soon after Zhang left. With an army of 200,000, Zhang took Yuezhou, Hengzhou and Changsha, and for a while Zhang stayed at Changsha where he controlled much of Hunan and part of Jiangxi.

=== Conquest of Sichuan ===
In 1644, Zhang decided to abandon Hunan and led 100,000 of his troops towards Sichuan. His army converged on Chongqing from two directions and surrounded the city. After several days of fighting, his army managed to blast a hole through the city wall and captured the city on 25 July 1644. He was said to have cut off the hands of the city's defenders and massacred a large number of people.

The conquest of some other parts of Sichuan was made easier after he promised not to harm the local population if they seized their officials, took possession of the storehouse and surrendered without resistance. He took Chengdu on 9 September 1644, and met no real opposition in the rest of Sichuan afterwards. He then set up court in Chengdu, which he renamed Xijing (西京, Western Capital), and declared himself king of the Xi dynasty (大西王朝, Great Western dynasty). In the 10th lunar month of 1644 he declared himself as emperor with the reign title Dashun.

=== Rule in Sichuan ===
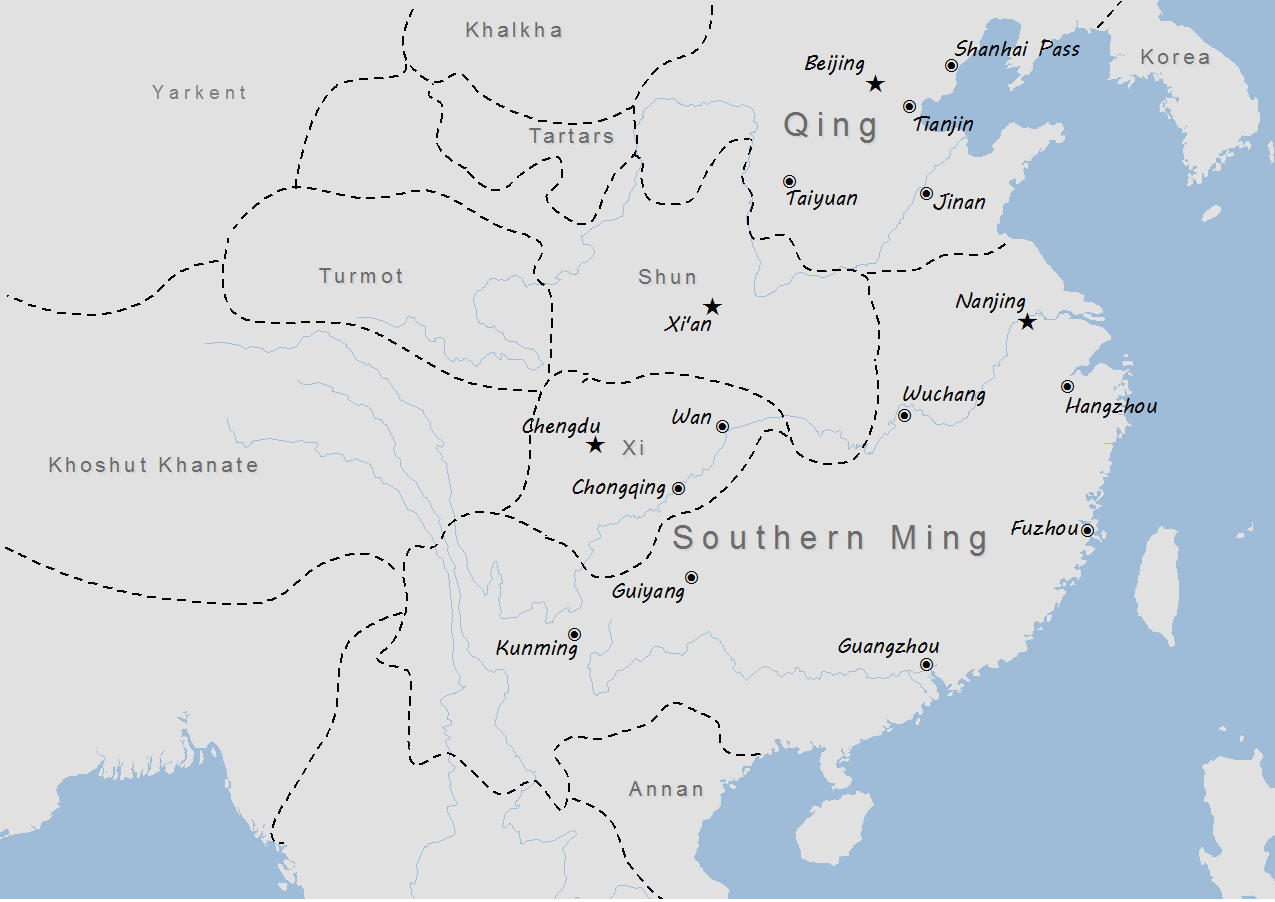
The situation of November 1644; the kingdom of Zhang Xianzhong (Xi) was near its greatest extent

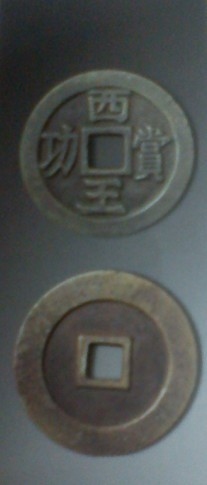
Zhang Xianzhong's regime minted coins.

In Sichuan, Zhang tried to set up a civil administration. Initially, he won much support. According to an account by Gabriel de Magalhães, a Portuguese Jesuit who was working in Sichuan with another Jesuit Lodovico Buglio (but both pressed to serve as astronomers to Zhang), "he began his rule with such liberality, justice and magnificence by which he captivated all hearts that many mandarins, famous both in civic as in military affairs whom fear was keeping concealed, left their hideouts and flew to his side."

However, resistance to his rule did not cease, and Chongqing was retaken by Ming loyalists in the spring of 1645. Zhang then embarked on a campaign of terror, which was well under way by the middle of 1645, to stamp out the remaining resistance in Sichuan. In November 1645, according to de Magalhães, Zhang, after hearing that "a huge and powerful army was coming against him", announced that "the people of his kingdom had a secret pact with the enemy and planned an uprising; because of this he was determined to kill any suspected resistors". The Jesuits, who now "understood the evil of this man", reported that while they managed to save a few of their Jesuit brothers who were taken, the rest were killed. Zhang's policy of terror increased in intensity, especially in 1646 after he had decided to abandon Sichuan. By then, Zhang's government had virtually disintegrated, all but three of his principal officials had either committed suicide or were executed.

=== Death ===
In 1636, the Manchu Hong Taiji had founded the Qing dynasty. The Qing army advanced through the Great Wall after the 1644 fall of the Ming dynasty to Li Zicheng. In 1646, the Qing sent out a force under the leadership of Haoge intending to attack Zhang's domain in Sichuan. In October 1646, Zhang abandoned Sichuan. He headed towards his homeland in Shaanxi, from whence the Qing army advanced. In January 1647, Zhang and the Qing forces met in Xichong where Zhang had set up camp. He was killed in the confrontation. According to one account, he was betrayed by one of his officers, a native of Sichuan named Liu Chin-chung (Liu Jinzhong) who resented his policy of terror in Sichuan. Zhang was alerted to his foes. He confronted them with only eight to ten men. Liu pointed Zhang out to the Qing when Zhang rushed out from his tent on learning of the betrayal. He was killed by a skilled Manchu archer. The Draft History of Qing has an entirely different account of his death and says he was killed by Oboi during a battle.

== Devastation of Sichuan ==
The events surrounding Zhang's rule and afterwards devastated Sichuan, where he was said to have "engaged in one of the most hair-raising genocides in imperial history". Lurid stories of his killings and flayings were given in various accounts. According to Shu Bi (蜀碧), an 18th-century account of the massacre, after every slaughter, the heads or skulls were collected and placed in several big piles, while the hands were placed in other big piles, and the ears and noses in more piles, so that Zhang could keep count of the killings. In one incident, he is said to have organized an imperial examination ostensibly to recruit scholars for his administration, only to have all the candidates, who numbered many thousands, killed. In another, to give thanks for his recovery after an illness, he was said to have cut off the feet of many women. The severed feet were heaped in two piles with those of his favorite concubine, whose feet were unusually small, placed on top. These two piles of feet were then doused in oil and set alight to become what he called "heavenly candles".

He was reported to have ordered further massacres before he abandoned Chengdu in advance of the Qing armies. The massacres, a subsequent famine and epidemic, attacks by tigers, as well as people fleeing from the turmoil and the Qing armies, resulted in a large-scale depopulation of Sichuan. The worst affected areas are believed to be Chengdu and its surrounding counties (mainly in Chengdu Plain), and places on the path of Zhang's retreat from Chengdu to Shaanxi.

=== Seven Kill Stele ===
A popular account of his life has it that he erected in Chengdu a stele, which came to be known as the Seven Kill Stele (七殺碑), with the following inscription:

天生萬物以養人
人無一善以報天
殺殺殺殺殺殺殺

Translation:

Heaven brings forth innumerable things to nurture man.
Man has nothing good with which to recompense Heaven.
Kill. Kill. Kill. Kill. Kill. Kill. Kill.

There are, however, considerable doubts that this account is accurate. In 1934, a stele thought to be this very one was found by a missionary – its reverse side contains an added inscription by a Southern Ming general commemorating Zhang's numerous victims whose bones he had collected and buried in 1646. While the first two lines of the poem on this stele are similar, the line with the seven kills is absent in this stele. Instead the actual line reads: "The spirits and gods are knowing, so reflect on this and examine yourselves" (鬼神明明，自思自量). Many therefore considered the story to be a distortion from the Qing era.

=== Deaths ===
The actual number of people killed by Zhang is not known and is disputed. The official history of the Ming dynasty, Ming Shi, records the figure of 600 million deaths due to Zhang's activities, an obvious exaggeration, the total population of China at that time being less than 150 million. According to an assessment by a modern historian, "the death toll is reputed to have been enormous, possibly one million out of a total provincial population of three million, before he was eventually killed by the Manchus." The combination of deaths from the massacres and other causes as well as flight of people from the province resulted in a sharp drop in the population of Sichuan. The population has been estimated to have dropped by as much as 75%, with fewer than a million people left in Sichuan, most of whom were clustered in the peripheral areas. The last Ming census figure for Sichuan in 1578 (more than 60 years before Zhang entered Sichuan) gave a population of 3,102,073. By 1661, only 16,096 adult males were registered in Sichuan; Chengdu was said to have become a virtual ghost town frequented by tigers. A later figure for Sichuan was from the 1720s, which is over 70 years after Zhang's death, long after the resettlement of Sichuan had begun. It recorded 634,802 households (that one estimate calculated to be around 2.5 million individuals).

Many, while acknowledging the massacres committed, do not believe that Zhang was responsible for the greater part of the population collapse in Sichuan, and thought that the greatest loss happened after his death due to the continuing turmoil, famine, and diseases. Some argued that while a great many died, Sichuan did not become virtually depopulated as recorded. Some modern Chinese historians such as Hu Zhaoxi considered him a proto-revolutionary, maintaining that accounts of the massacres were exaggerated, and many of the deaths were caused by others including the Qing, Ming and rebel forces, that his victims were Ming nobles, rich landlords, and other "counter-revolutionary" elements, and that his heinous reputation was the result of "Qing slanders" and "reactionary propaganda".

== Aftermath ==
Before he had abandoned Sichuan, Zhang divided his forces into four divisions, each led by one of his four generals (Li Dingguo, Sun Kewang, Liu Wenxiu, Ai Nengqi). These remnants of his army, as well as Ming loyalists, held out in Sichuan, Yunnan, and Guizhou after Zhang's death, and most of Sichuan did not come under control of the Qing until a dozen years or so later, and fighting only finally ended in eastern Sichuan in 1664.

=== Deification ===
It is said that when Zhang Xianzhong led the army through Zitong, he was entrusted by Wenchang Wang not to kill the people in the dream, so Zhang regarded the residents of Zitong as brothers of the same clan, and the residents of Zitong were not massacred. Modern Chinese social science researcher Yang Peide believed the Zhang's behavior is a political stunt. For thanks to Zhang's grace of not killing, the residents of Zitong established his statue in the Wenchang Temple of Zitong. In 1742, An Hongde, the head of Mianzhu County, directed that the statue be destroyed, but it was then rebuilt. In 1987, the local government erected a monument for the statue.

=== Resettlement of Sichuan ===
In order to fill up the depopulated regions of Sichuan, a massive resettlement program was initiated during the Qing dynasty, starting around 1670 or 1671 and lasting more than two centuries. Millions of people from Hubei, Fujian, Jiangxi, Guangdong, Shaanxi and other provinces were resettled in Sichuan. Some of the early immigrants were those who returned after fleeing Sichuan (including the ancestors of Chinese leader Deng Xiaoping), but some were also coerced. A large number of the migrants came from Huguang (now Hubei/Hunan), and the migration was therefore described by 19th century scholar Wei Yuan as "Huguang filling Sichuan". By the 1720s, 70–80% of the population of Sichuan was reportedly non-native, and as much as 85% a century later.

== Modern legacy ==
In 2021, inspired by the so-called "Auntology" and several consecutive random killings linked to social issues in China, through online diffusion and memetic adaptation, Zhang Xianzhong has been re-appropriated as a term to describe indiscriminate mass killings, evolving into a distinct internet subculture marked by irony, despair, and subversive critique, as well as an implied expectation of accelerationism. In the wake of the killings, the term Xianzhongxue, translating as "Xianzhong-ology", became an internet buzzword. Its use gained further traction after the Zhuhai vehicular attack, the Wuxi stabbing and the Suzhou bus stop stabbing in 2024, events which also prompted increased censorship targeting the term. Minetoshi Yasuda from Shūkan Bunshun observed that the term is frequently used by Chinese netizens, who are characterized by anti-establishment, otaku, and troll traits.
