= Macheng =

Macheng 麻城市
- County-level city
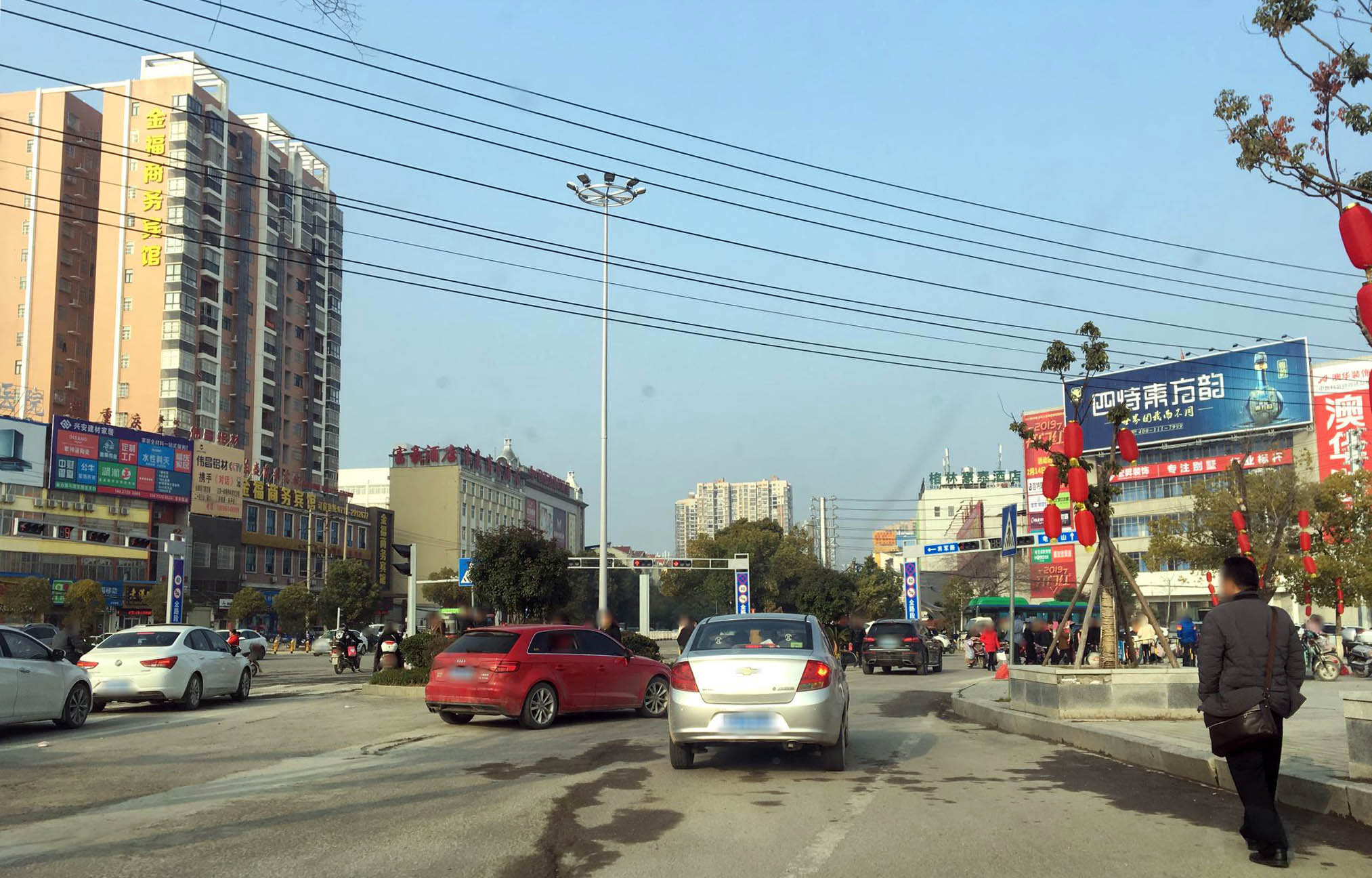
- Macheng urban area
- Nickname: Azalea city
- Location in Hubei
- Coordinates (Macheng government): 31°10′23″N 115°00′29″E
- Country: People's Republic of China
- Province: Hubei
- Prefecture-level city: Huanggang

Area
  - County-level city: 3,600 km^{2} (1,400 sq mi)
  - Urban: 251.27 km^{2} (97.02 sq mi)

Population (2020 census)
  - County-level city: 893,654
  - Density: 250/km^{2} (640/sq mi)
  - Urban: 435,076
- Time zone: UTC+8 (China Standard)
- Website: 麻城市政府门户网站 (Macheng City Government Web Portal) (in Simplified Chinese)

Macheng (Chinese: 麻城; pinyin: Máchéng) is a city in northeastern Hubei province, People's Republic of China, bordering the provinces of Henan to the north and Anhui to the northeast. It is a county-level city under the administration of Huanggang City and abuts the south side of the Dabie Mountains. The city's administrative area covers about 3,747 square kilometres (1,447 sq mi), and includes some 704 villages and small towns. Total population was 893,654 at the 2020 census.

== History ==
Macheng has a long history, dating back to the Spring and Autumn period as part of the state of Chu, and was the site of the historic Battle of Boju fought between Chu and Wu in 506 BC. It was named Macheng in 598 AD.

In 1927, a major peasant revolt erupted in Macheng, creating a strong base for the ensuing Communist revolution in 1949. More than 100,000 people joined Mao's Red Army under local Generals, Wang Shusheng and Chen Zaidao. A guerilla base in Macheng was eliminated in the Campaign to Suppress Bandits in Dabieshan.

Macheng played a key role during the Great Leap Forward. In an effort to increase crop yields, the local communist cadres began demolishing walls of old buildings, abandoned huts and farm stables where animals had urinated to provide nutrients for the soil. In January 1958, Macheng County was exalted by the provincial party secretary, Wang Renzhong. for reaching a rice yield of six tonnes per hectare. The People's Daily applauded the efforts in an op-ed and labelled it as a 'model commune' which attracted more than half a million cadres in 1958, including Zhou Enlai, Chen Yi and Li Xiannian. Spurred on by the positive coverage, overzealous local officials destroyed more than 50,000 houses in an effort to make more manure which spurred other neighboring counties and provinces to follow. As many as 30–40% of all houses in China were destroyed following this incident during the Great Leap Forward.

== Geography ==
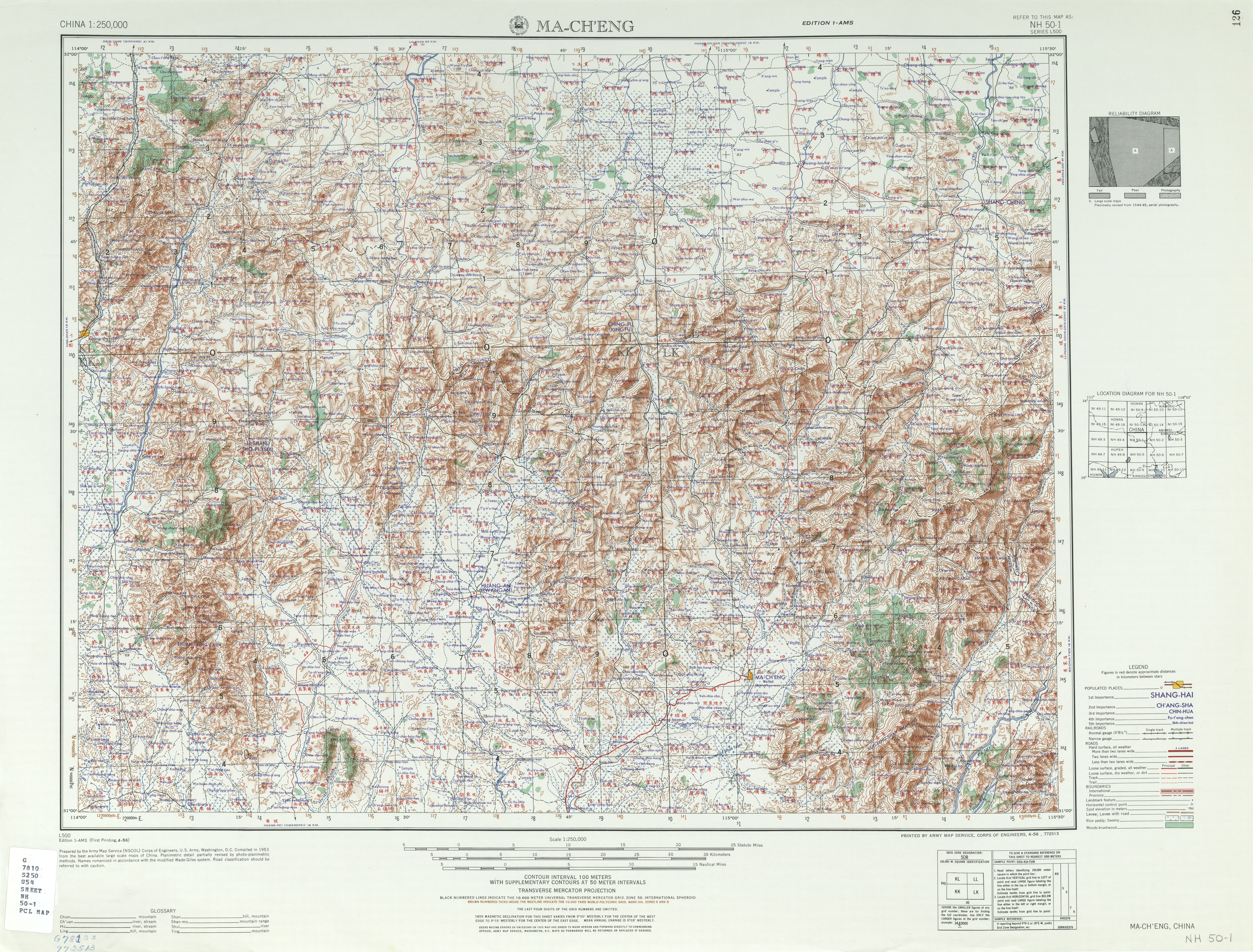
Map including Macheng (labeled as MA-CH'ENG Walled 麻城) (AMS, 1953)

=== Administrative Divisions ===
Macheng administers:

#	Name	Chinese (S)
Districts
1	Longchiqiao Subdistrict Dragon Pond Bridge	龙池桥街道
2	Gulou Subdistrict Drum tower	鼓楼街道
3	Nanhu Subdistrict South Lake	南湖街道
Towns
4	Zhongguanyi Town	中馆驿镇
5	Songbu Town	宋埠镇
6	Qiting Town	歧亭镇
7	Baiguo Town	白果镇
8	Fuzihe Town	夫子河镇
9	Yanjiahe Town	阎家河镇
10	Guishan Town	龟山镇
11	Yantianhe Town	盐田河镇
12	Zhangjiafan Town	张家畈镇
13	Muzidian Town	木子店镇
14	Sanhekou Town	三河口镇
15	Huangtugang Town	黄土岗镇
16	Futianhe Town	福田河镇
17	C/Shengmagang Town	乘马岗镇
18	Shunhe Town (Shunheji)	顺河镇 (顺河集镇)
Townships
19	Tiemengang Township	铁门岗乡
Other Areas
20	Macheng Economic Development Zone	麻城经济开发区

=== Geography of city ===
The county-level city of Macheng has a total land area of 3,600 km^{2} (1,400 sq mi). It is located in the northeastern portions of Hubei. Most of the higher elevation portions of the Dabie Mountains is on the northern portions of the city. It is bordered by Henan to the northwest and Anhui to the northeast respectively. The region where Macheng is located is considered as a subtropical area and the Dabie mountainous terrain is mainly to the north and northeast.

=== Climate ===
Macheng has a humid subtropical climate (Köppen climate classification: Cfa) with very hot summers and relatively cold winters.

Climate data for Macheng, elevation 74 m (243 ft), (1991–2020 normals, extremes 1981–present)
Month	Jan	Feb	Mar	Apr	May	Jun	Jul	Aug	Sep	Oct	Nov	Dec	Year
Record high °C (°F)	21.3 (70.3)	27.7 (81.9)	34.7 (94.5)	34.5 (94.1)	36.2 (97.2)	37.7 (99.9)	39.7 (103.5)	40.2 (104.4)	38.0 (100.4)	35.1 (95.2)	30.5 (86.9)	22.9 (73.2)	40.2 (104.4)
Mean daily maximum °C (°F)	8.8 (47.8)	11.9 (53.4)	16.7 (62.1)	23.0 (73.4)	27.7 (81.9)	30.6 (87.1)	33.2 (91.8)	33.2 (91.8)	29.4 (84.9)	23.9 (75.0)	17.6 (63.7)	11.2 (52.2)	22.3 (72.1)
Daily mean °C (°F)	3.9 (39.0)	6.8 (44.2)	11.3 (52.3)	17.5 (63.5)	22.4 (72.3)	26.0 (78.8)	28.8 (83.8)	28.2 (82.8)	24.0 (75.2)	18.2 (64.8)	11.7 (53.1)	5.9 (42.6)	17.1 (62.7)
Mean daily minimum °C (°F)	0.5 (32.9)	3.0 (37.4)	7.2 (45.0)	12.9 (55.2)	18.0 (64.4)	22.1 (71.8)	25.3 (77.5)	24.5 (76.1)	20.0 (68.0)	13.9 (57.0)	7.5 (45.5)	2.1 (35.8)	13.1 (55.5)
Record low °C (°F)	−12.7 (9.1)	−6.6 (20.1)	−4.3 (24.3)	1.2 (34.2)	7.6 (45.7)	11.9 (53.4)	17.7 (63.9)	16.7 (62.1)	10.7 (51.3)	1.8 (35.2)	−3.9 (25.0)	−14.8 (5.4)	−14.8 (5.4)
Average precipitation mm (inches)	41.8 (1.65)	55.9 (2.20)	84.0 (3.31)	108.3 (4.26)	146.3 (5.76)	222.0 (8.74)	264.5 (10.41)	131.3 (5.17)	68.8 (2.71)	62.2 (2.45)	49.2 (1.94)	26.8 (1.06)	1,261.1 (49.66)
Average precipitation days (≥ 0.1 mm)	9.1	9.4	11.6	10.5	11.5	11.4	11.5	9.8	8.0	8.5	8.0	6.8	116.1
Average snowy days	3.7	2.2	0.7	0	0	0	0	0	0	0	0.5	1.1	8.2
Average relative humidity (%)	72	72	72	71	72	77	77	76	73	71	72	70	73
Mean monthly sunshine hours	119.7	121.0	147.6	175.0	186.6	175.6	217.7	230.5	191.3	174.8	153.8	139.2	2,032.8
Percentage possible sunshine	37	38	40	45	44	42	51	57	52	50	49	44	46
Source: China Meteorological Administration

=== Hydrology ===
Two major rivers, Jushui and Bashui, flow through Macheng. Both of them originate in Dabie Mountains, and flow into the Yangtze.

== Economy ==
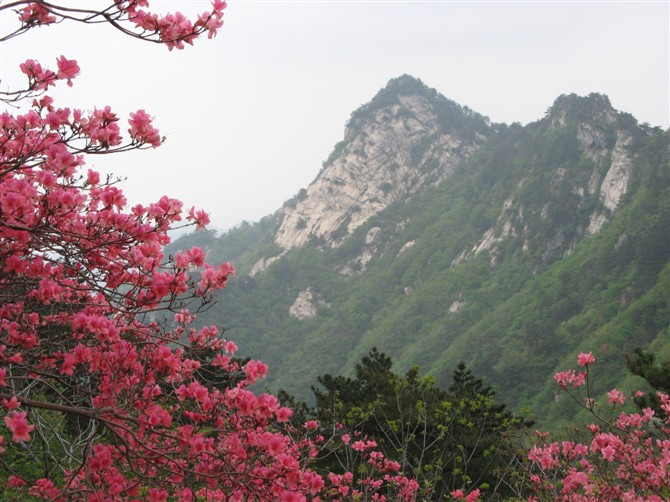
Mount Guifeng with Azalea blooms in Macheng

Macheng is rich in resources, with about 66,667 hectares (164,740 acres) under agricultural cultivation. Forests cover about 200,000 hectares (490,000 acres) and water covers about 30,000 hectares (74,000 acres). The main mineral reserves are basalt, marble, and silicon, with large deposits of jade, gold, silver (large deposits of gold and silver are not verified) and copper, among others. The main plant crops are Chinese chestnuts, chrysanthemums, and persimmon fruit. The area is also famous for mulberry bushes and related silkworm production.

== Transportation ==
There are two railway stations in Macheng. Macheng railway station is on the Beijing–Kowloon railway between Beijing and Hong Kong. Macheng North railway station is on the Hefei–Wuhan railway.

== Education ==
- Macheng NO.1 high school

== Villages ==
- Xiangqishan Village
