= Campaign to Suppress Bandits in Central and Southern China =

Military campaign in China, 1949 to 1953

- Part of the Chinese Civil War
Date	April 1949 – June 1953
Location	Central and Southern China
Result	Communist victory

Belligerents
National Revolutionary Army	China

Commanders and leaders
Various KMT leaders and guerrilla commanders	Lin Biao; Liu Bocheng; He Long; Deng Xiaoping

Strength
1,160,000+	110,000+

Casualties and losses
1,160,000+	?

The Campaign to Suppress Bandits in Central and Southern China (中南剿匪) was a counter-guerrilla / counterinsurgency campaign the communists fought against the Nationalist guerrillas that mostly consisted of anti-Communist irregular forces and Nationalist regular troops left behind after the Nationalist government withdrew from mainland China. The campaign was fought during the Chinese Civil War in the post-World War II era in six Chinese provinces: Henan, Hubei, Hunan, Jiangxi, Guangdong and Guangxi, and resulted in a Communist victory.

== Campaign ==
The Communists planned their campaign in three stages, with the first lasting from May to November 1949. Henan, Hubei, Hunan, Jiangxi, Guangxi and Guangdong Military Districts mobilized available regular and militia forces and launched waves of offensives against bandits; by the end of the year, over 334,600 bandits had been annihilated. After a brief and dormant period, however, the bandits/guerrillas counterattacked in the spring of 1950. The Communist high command of the Central and Southern Military Region held a conference in March 1950 to discuss the next step and decided it would take three months to eradicate the bandits. Over 40,000 troops were allotted to the Hunan Military District to eradicate bandits in western Hunan, Taifu (太浮) Mountains in Changde and Dragon Mountain in Shaoyang, and by the end of June 1950 over 40,000 bandits had been killed. An equal number were killed in the same period in Pearl River Delta and on the coastal islands in Guangdong. Meanwhile, eight regiments of Guangxi Military District managed to kill over 30,000 bandits in southeastern Guangxi.

In July 1950 the bandits/guerrillas became overly confident due to the outbreak of the Korean War, believing that the Communist regime would collapse because it was not a match for the much more powerful US military. Consequently, they decided to launch a massive offensive. The Communist high command of Central and Southern Military Region held a second conference and decided to reinforce Guangxi and Guangdong, concentrating on western and northern Guangdong. In western Hunan two commands in the north and south would be formed to better coordinate the campaigns aimed at eradicating bandits in the border region of Hubei, Sichuan, Guizhou and Guangxi provinces. By the end of May 1951 over 500,000 bandits had been eradicated. This marked the end of conventional warfare, which the bandits/guerrillas could no longer launch and they also could no longer mass sufficient strength to launch any strikes that posed a real threat to the communist regime. By the beginning of June 1950 the campaign turned into purely counter-guerrilla warfare. The Communists improved upon their military success by sending over 30,000 cadres to the countryside to support land reform, and managed to win the support of most of the peasantry there. The Communists further changed their tactics by forming over 3,000 counter-guerrilla teams and fought the bandits/guerrillas with guerrilla warfare, and after a year over 76,000 bandits were further eradicated.

On June 1, 1952, the Communists adjusted their tactics once more due to the progress made earlier, and the concentration turned into counterinsurgency warfare, with the responsibility transferred to local police forces. However, the Chinese police force at the time, the Public Security Army (Gong An Jun, 公安军) was a branch of the regular army. By April 1953 another 17,000 bandits were eradicated, and in June 1953 all tasks were transferred to police forces when the Communists declared that the campaign ended with the eradication of over 1.16 million bandits in central and southern China.

== Outcome ==
Although sharing the common anti-communist goal, the nationalist guerrilla and insurgency warfare was largely handicapped by the enlistment of bandits, many of whom had fought and killed nationalist troops earlier in the eradication / pacification campaign, and compounded by the additional differences within the nationalist guerrilla, the nationalist guerrilla and insurgency warfare against its communist enemy failed. For the communists, in addition to the complete eradication of the bandits, another benefit of the campaign was obtaining a valuable source of tough soldiers: most bandits were captured and surrendered with a significant portion of them later joined People's Volunteer Army to fight in the Korean War, and facing the overwhelming superior firepower of UN, their performance was considered “heroic” and “brave” by the communists. However, due to obvious political reasons, their banditry past was carefully left out in the communist propaganda and it was not until in the late 1990s was the truth finally allowed to be publicized.

== See also ==
- Outline of the Chinese Civil War
- National Revolutionary Army
- History of the People's Liberation Army
- Chinese Civil War
