= Tiantangzhai =

Mountain in China

Coordinates: 31°06′18″N 115°46′19″E

Tiāntángzhài (Chinese: 天堂寨) is the second highest peak of the Dabie Mountains located on the border between Hubei and Anhui provinces in the People's Republic of China. Straddling Hubei's Luotian County and Huanggang City along with Jinzhai County in Anhui, the mountain rises to a height of 1,729.13 metres (5,673.0 ft) above sea level. It forms the watershed between the Huai and Yangtze Rivers and is also known as the "Number one pass in the southeastern Yangtze River region" (吴楚东南第一关).

During the Tang and Song dynasties Tiantangzhai was known as "Yun Shan" (云山, Cloud Mountain). In the Yuan and Ming dynasties it became "Duoyun Shan" (多云山, Mountain of Many Clouds). The present name dates from the Qing dynasty.

== Tourism ==
There are three national forest parks in the vicinity of the mountain: Dabie Mountain National Forest Park in Luotian County, Tiantangtai National Forest Park in Jinzhai County, and Wujia Mountain National Forest Park in Yingshang County, Anhui Province.

In 1987, Tiantangzhai became a provincial level scenic area and in 1992 the State Forestry Administration approved the establishment of Tiantangtai International Forest Park. The Chinese State Council promoted the area to national scenic area in 1998. In August 2008, the Land & Resources Bureau approved the creation of Dabie Mountain State Geological Park (大别山国家地质公园). In 2007 the whole area became a National 4A Tourism Area.

== Flora and fauna ==
Tiantangzhai is home to more than 1,000 plant and animal species including many types of oak and cherry-apple trees as well as protected plants such as the Chinese plum yew and Chinese tulip tree. There are 18 rare animal species such as the leopard, small Indian civet, and Chinese giant salamander.
