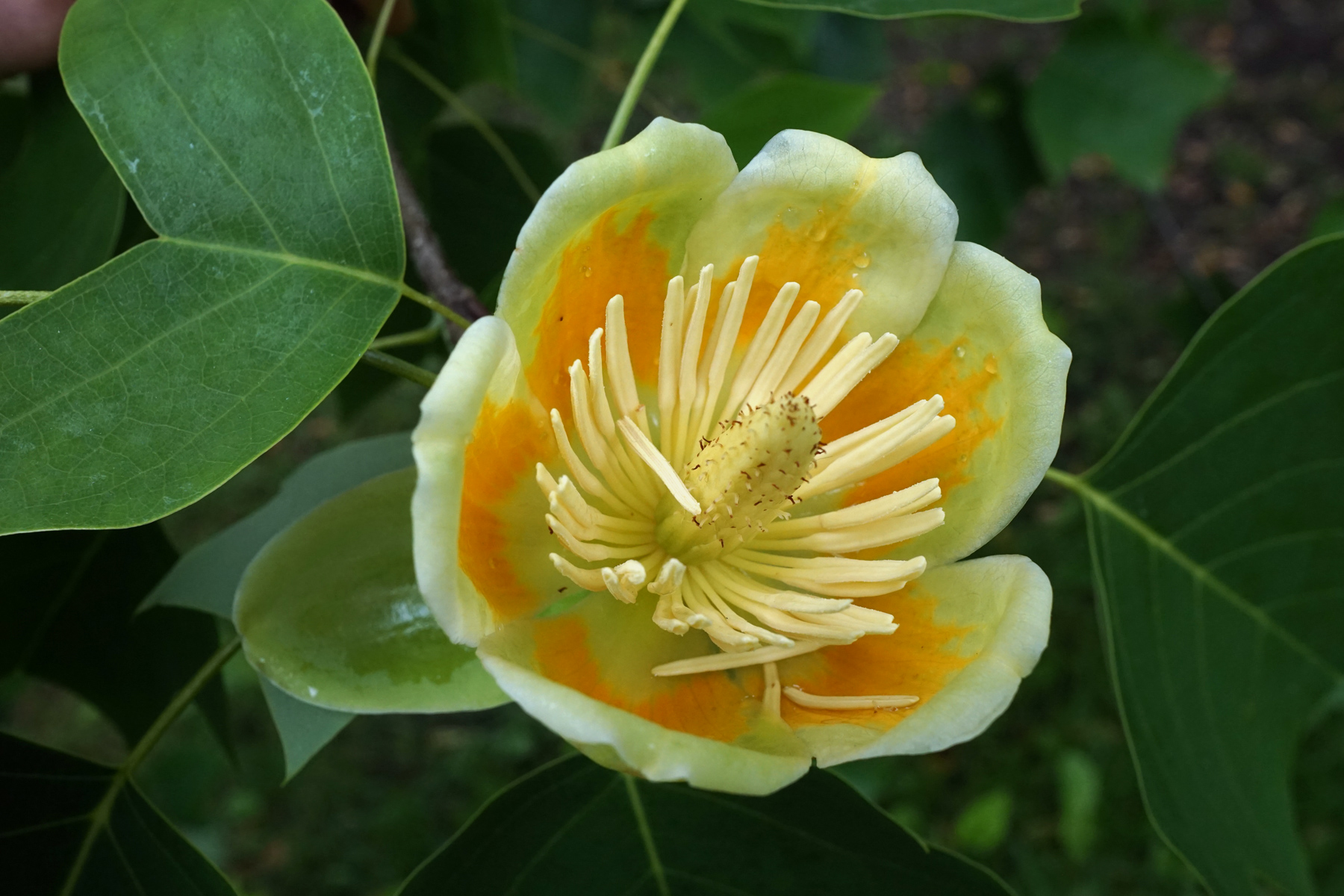

Scientific classification
- Kingdom: Plantae
- Clade: Tracheophytes
- Clade: Angiosperms
- Clade: Magnoliids
- Order: Magnoliales
- Family: Magnoliaceae
- Genus: Liriodendron
- Species: L. × sinoamericanum

Binomial name
- Liriodendron × sinoamericanum P.C.Yieh ex C.B.Shang & Zhang R.Wang

= Liriodendron × sinoamericanum =

Hybrid of American and Chinese tulip tree

Liriodendron × sinoamericanum is an artificial hybrid of Liriodendron chinense and Liriodendron tulipifera in the family Magnoliaceae.

== Description ==
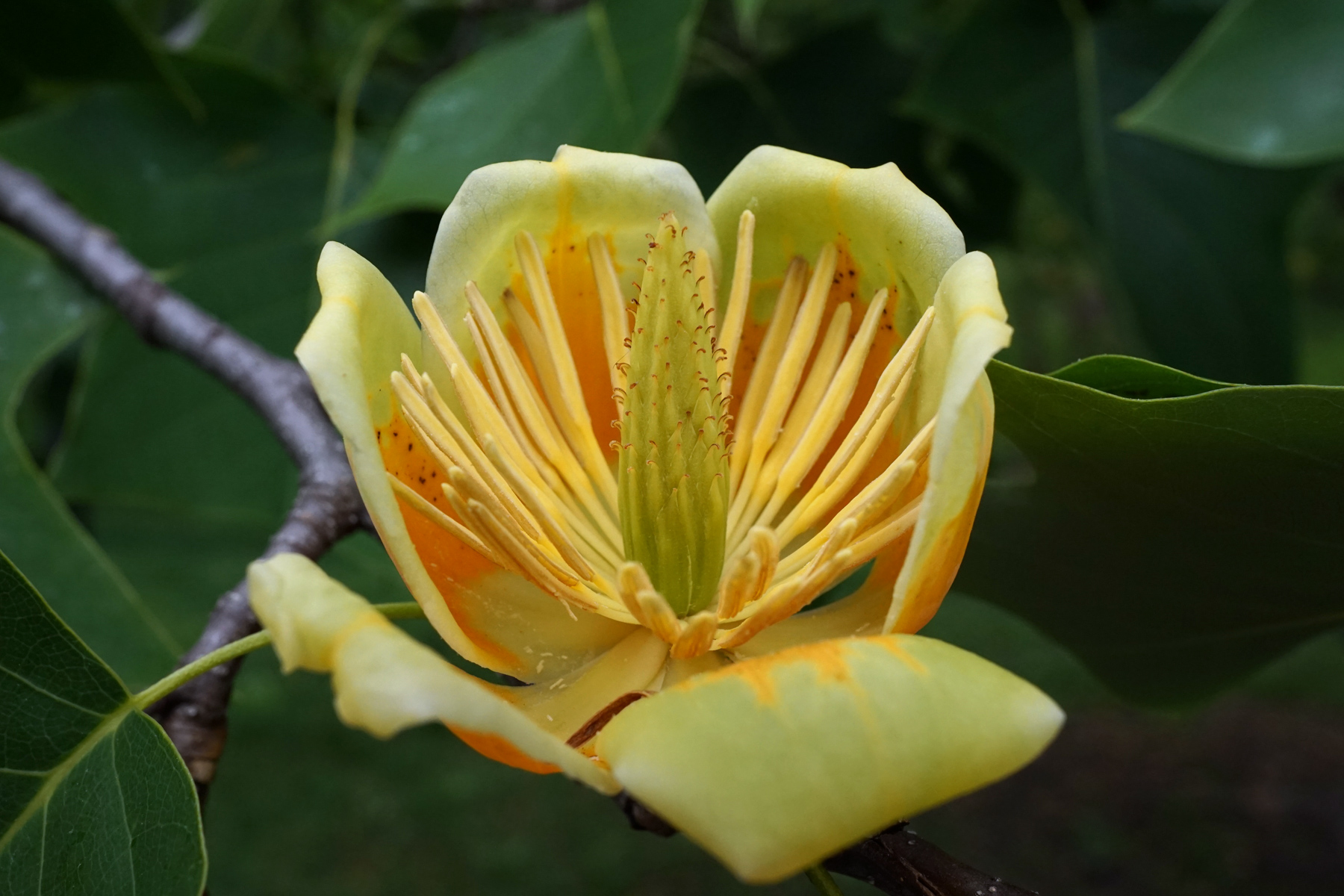
Liriodendron × sinoamericanum flower

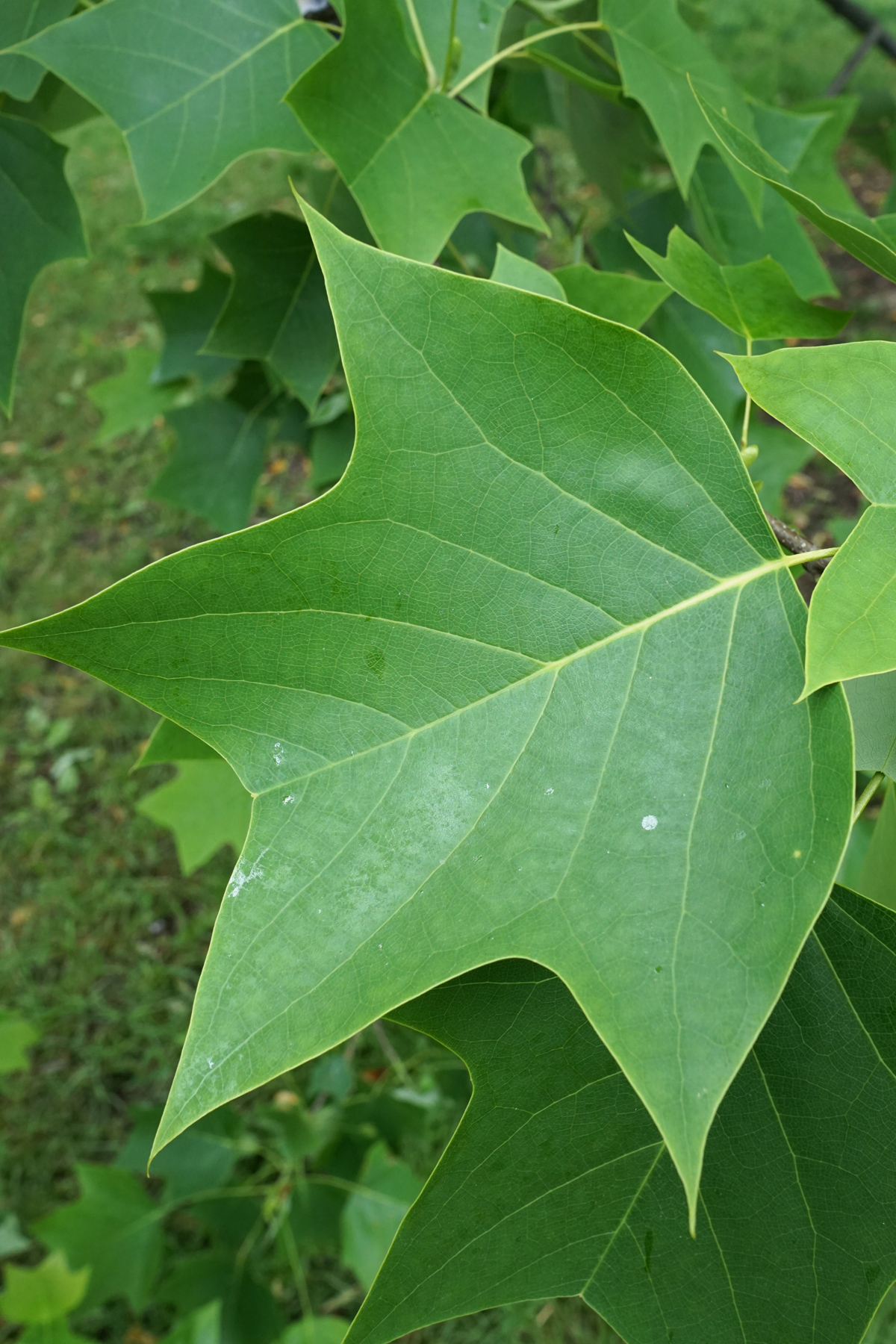
Leaf

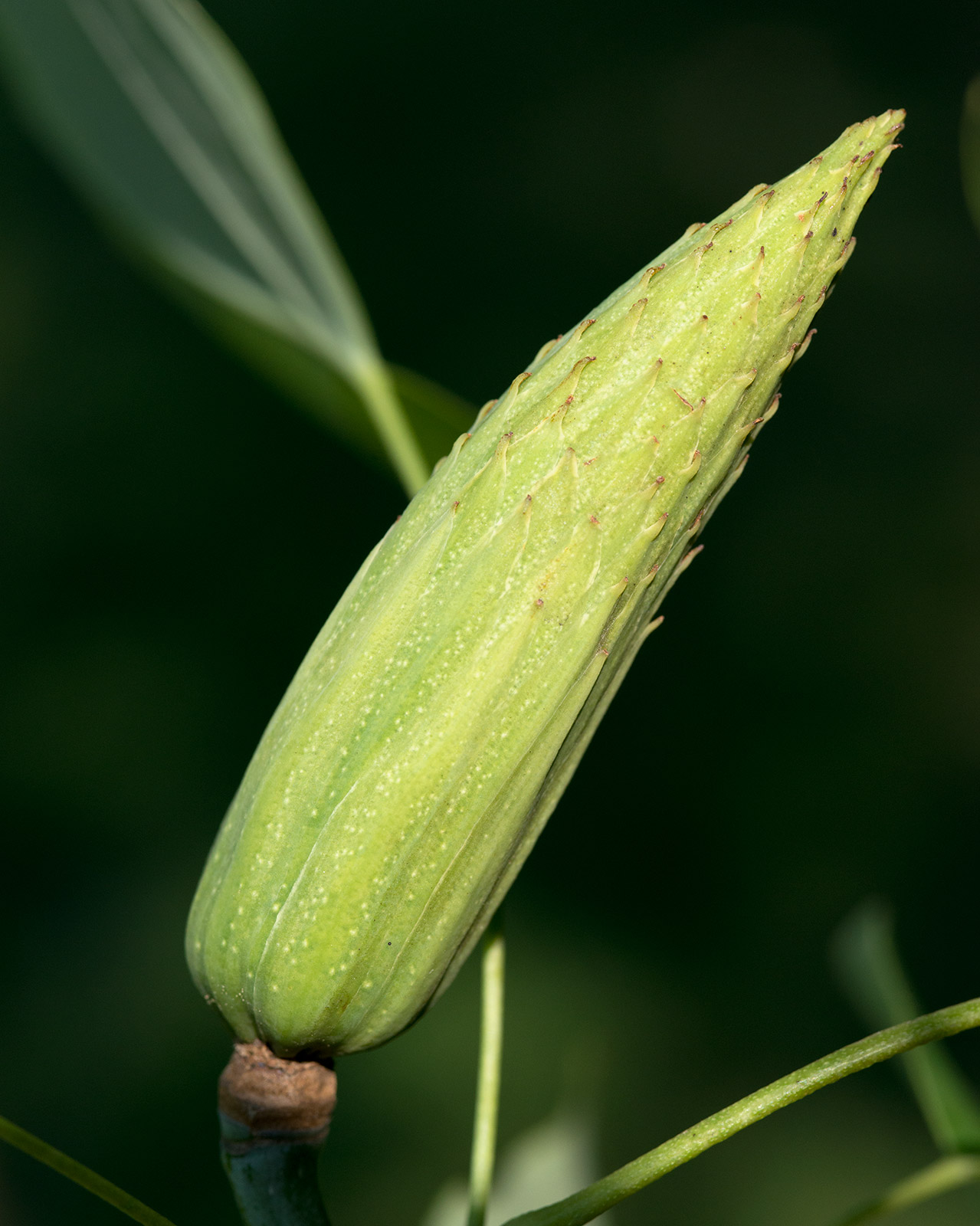
Fruit

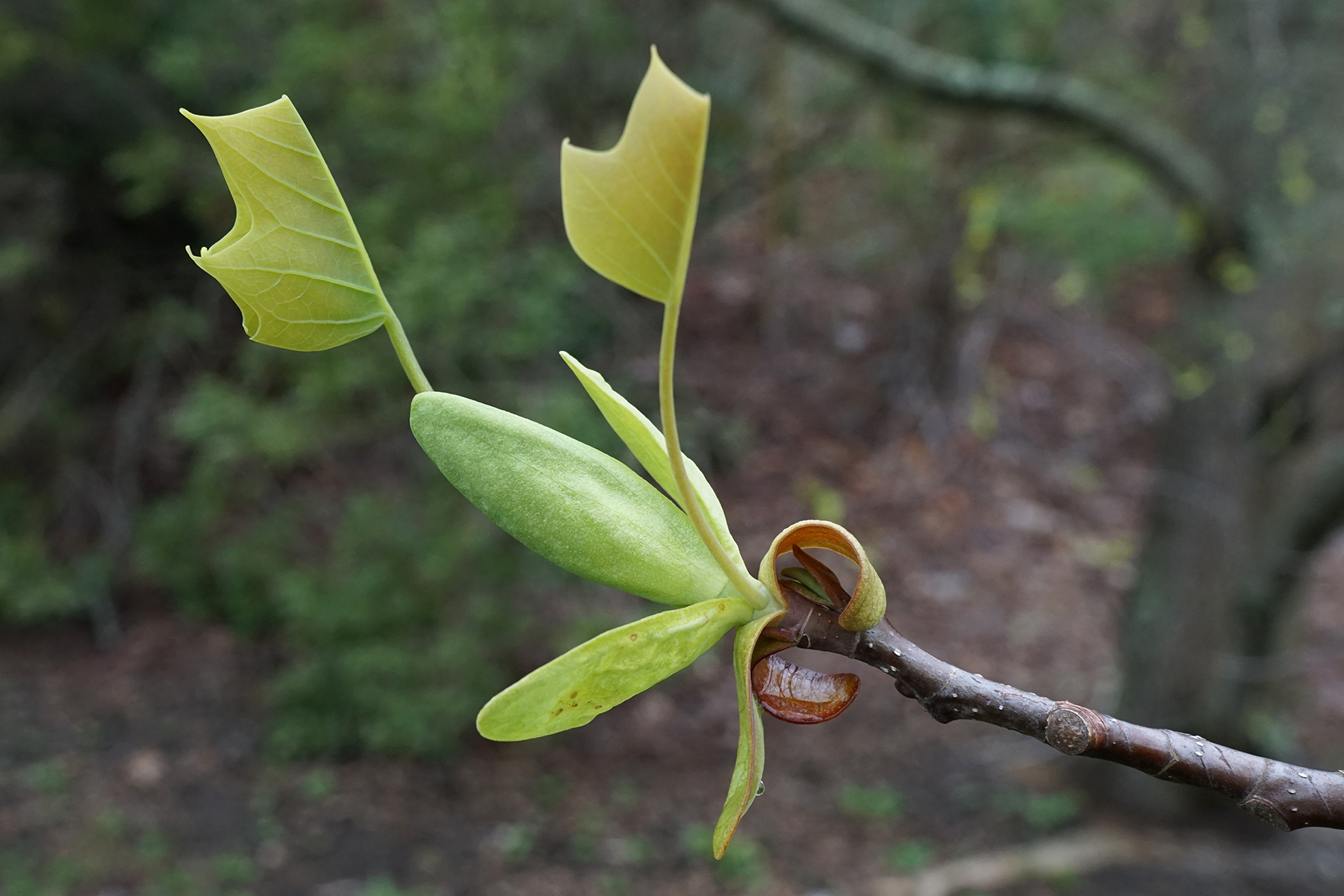
Liriodendron × sinoamericanum twig with leaves

Parent species of L. × sinoamericanum

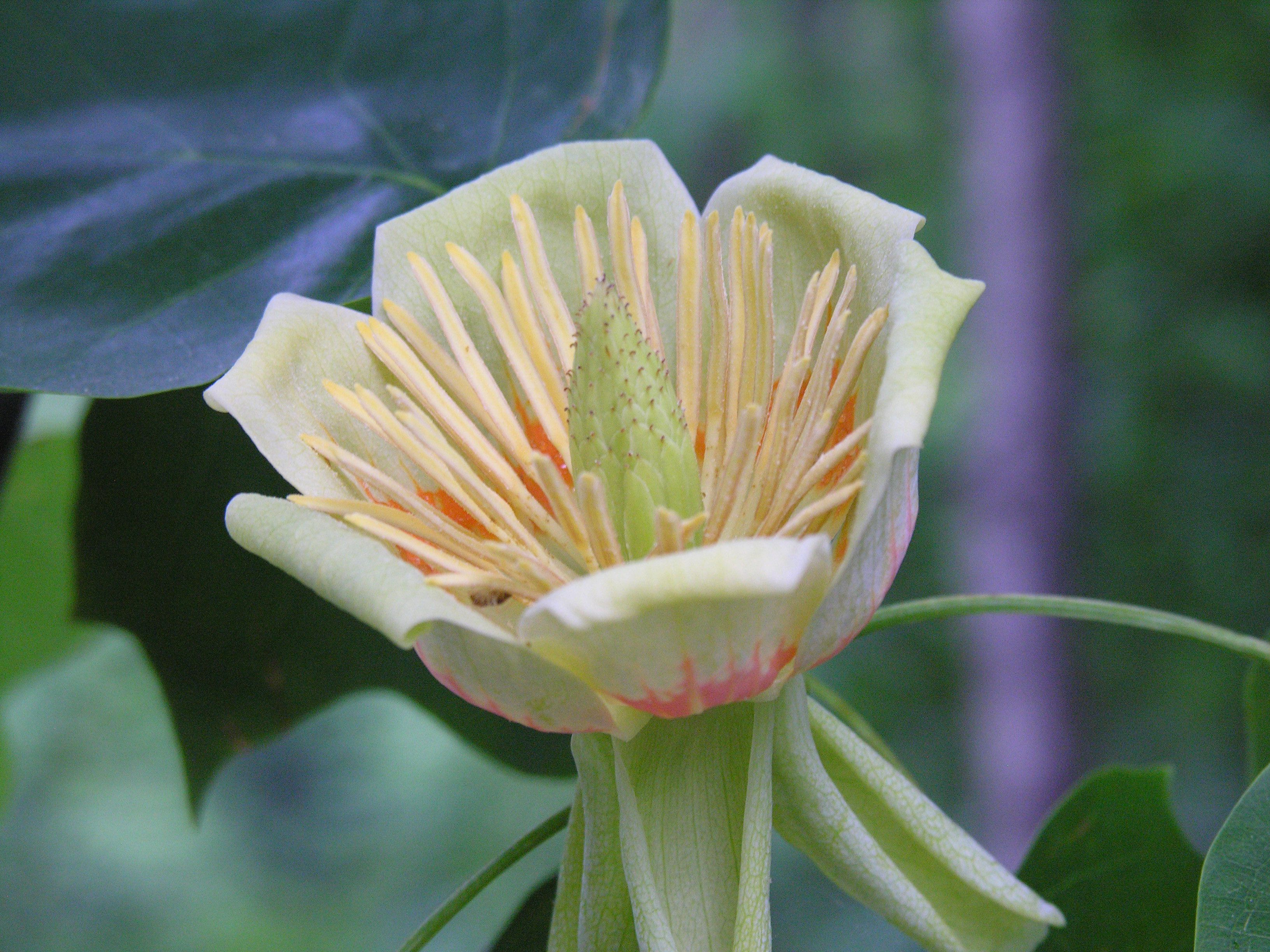
Liriodendron tulipifera

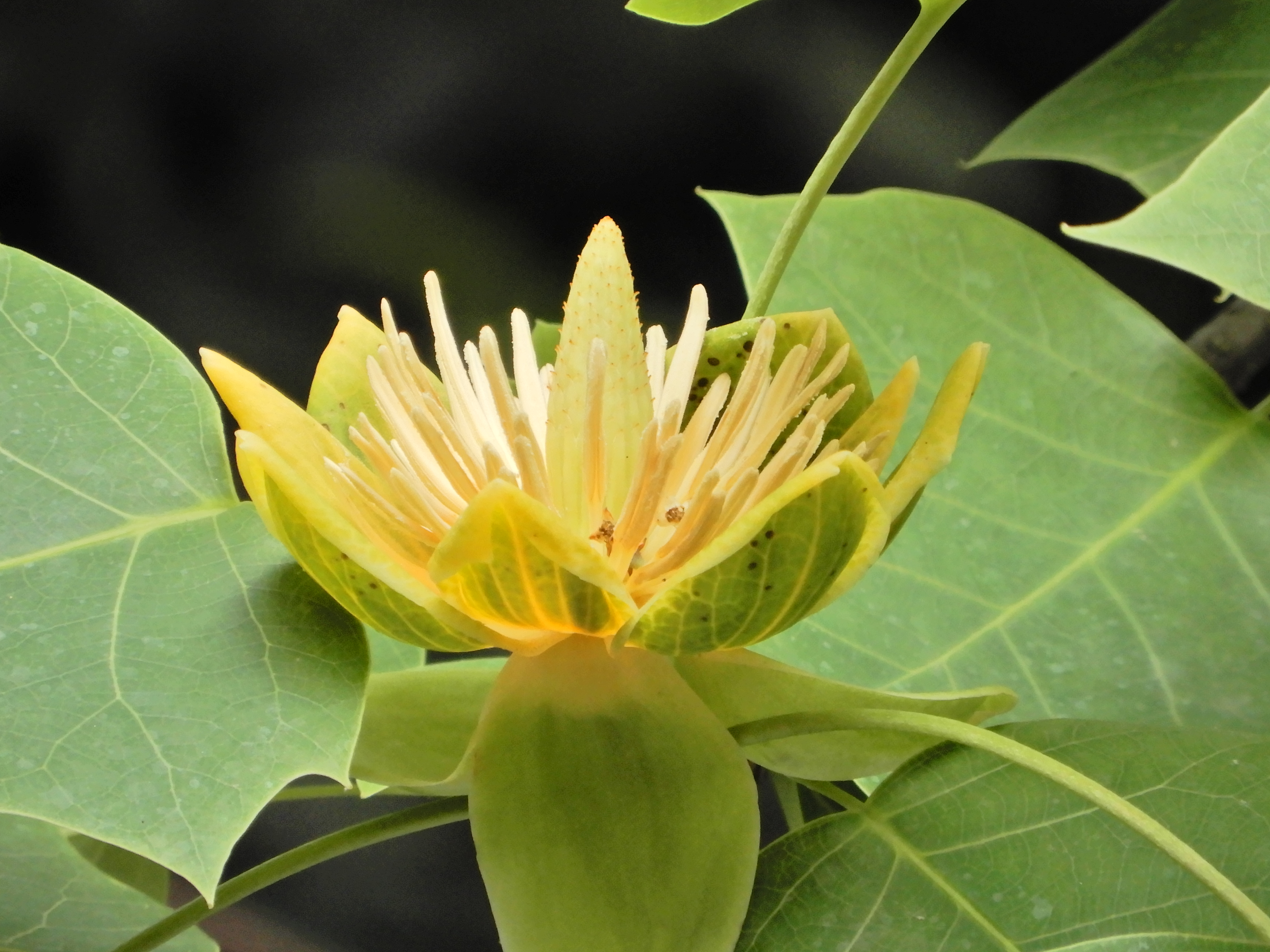
Liriodendron chinense

=== Vegetative characteristics ===
Liriodendron × sinoamericanum is a large, 30 m tall (or taller), deciduous tree with grey-brown bark. The leaf is 6–20 cm long, and 6–23 cm wide. The petiole is 5–18 cm long.

=== Generative characteristics ===
The bisexual, cup-shaped, nectariferous flowers have nine tepals. The three outer tepals are green, while the inner six tepals are orange.

=== Cytology ===
Tetraploid plants have been created.

== Taxonomy ==
It was described by Chih Bei Shang and Zhang Rong Wang based on previous work by Pei Chong Yieh in 2012. The type specimen was collected by Z. R.Wang. It was a cultivated tree in the campus of the Nanjing Forestry University.

=== Etymology ===
The hybrid name sinoamericanum from sino- meaning Chinese and -americanum meaning American means chinese-american.

== Conservation ==
In China, Liriodendron × sinoamericanum may pose a threat to the endangered species Liriodendron chinense, due to hybridisation.

== Cultivation ==
It can be grown in well-drained soils, but it does not grow well in poorly drained soils. Due to heterosis, it grows more vigorously than the parent species. It is widely cultivated in China, but it hasn't been commercialised elsewhere.

== Use ==
It is suitable for producing paper and furniture.
