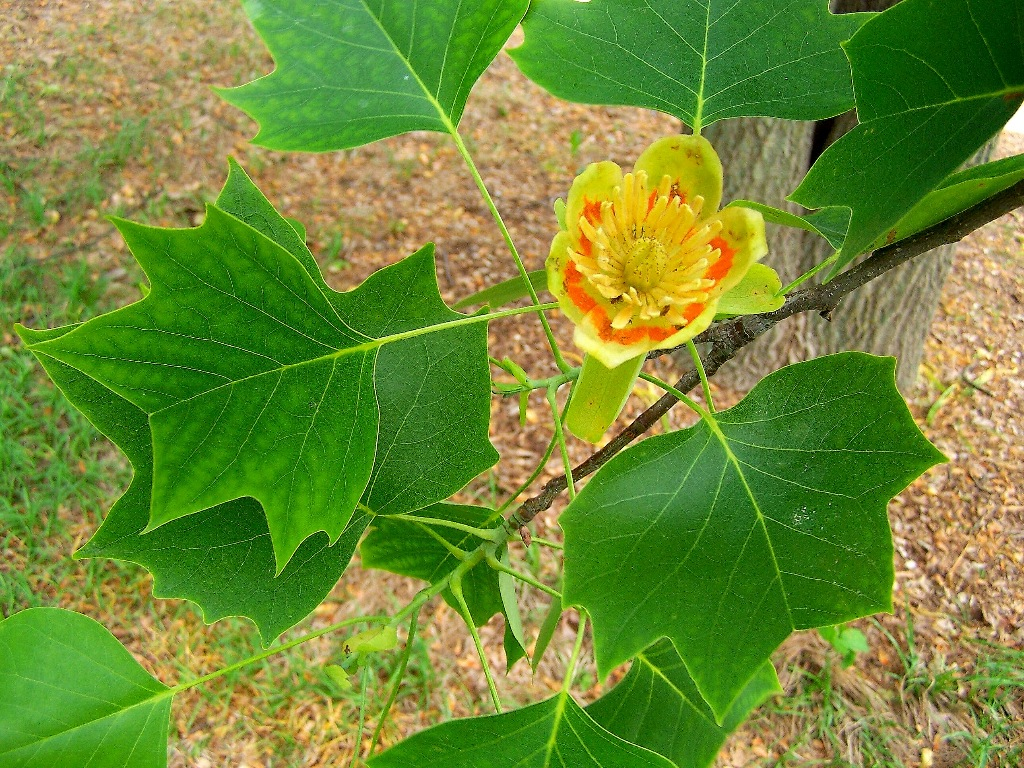
- Liriodendron tulipifera foliage and flower. Morton Arboretum acc. 500-67*21

Scientific classification
- Kingdom: Plantae
- Clade: Tracheophytes
- Clade: Angiosperms
- Clade: Magnoliids
- Order: Magnoliales
- Family: Magnoliaceae
- Genus: Liriodendron; L.

Type species
- Liriodendron tulipifera L.

Species
- See here

Synonyms
- Tulipifera Mill.

= Liriodendron =

Liriodendron Temporal range: 99.7–0 Ma Late Cretaceous - present

Genus of trees

Liriodendron (/ˌlaɪriəˈdɛndrən, ˌlɪr-, -ioʊ-/) is a genus of two species of characteristically large trees, deciduous over most of their populations, in the magnolia family (Magnoliaceae).

These trees are widely known by the common name tulip tree or tuliptree for their large flowers superficially resembling tulips. It is sometimes referred to as tulip poplar or yellow poplar, and the wood simply as "poplar", although not closely related to the true poplars. Other common names include canoewood, saddle-leaf tree, and white wood.

The two extant species are Liriodendron tulipifera, native to eastern North America, and Liriodendron chinense, native to China and Vietnam. Both species often grow to great size; the North American species may reach as much as 58.5 m (192 ft) in height. The North American species is commonly used horticulturally, the Chinese species is increasing in cultivation, and hybrids have been produced between these two allopatrically distributed species.

Various extinct species of Liriodendron have been described from the fossil record.

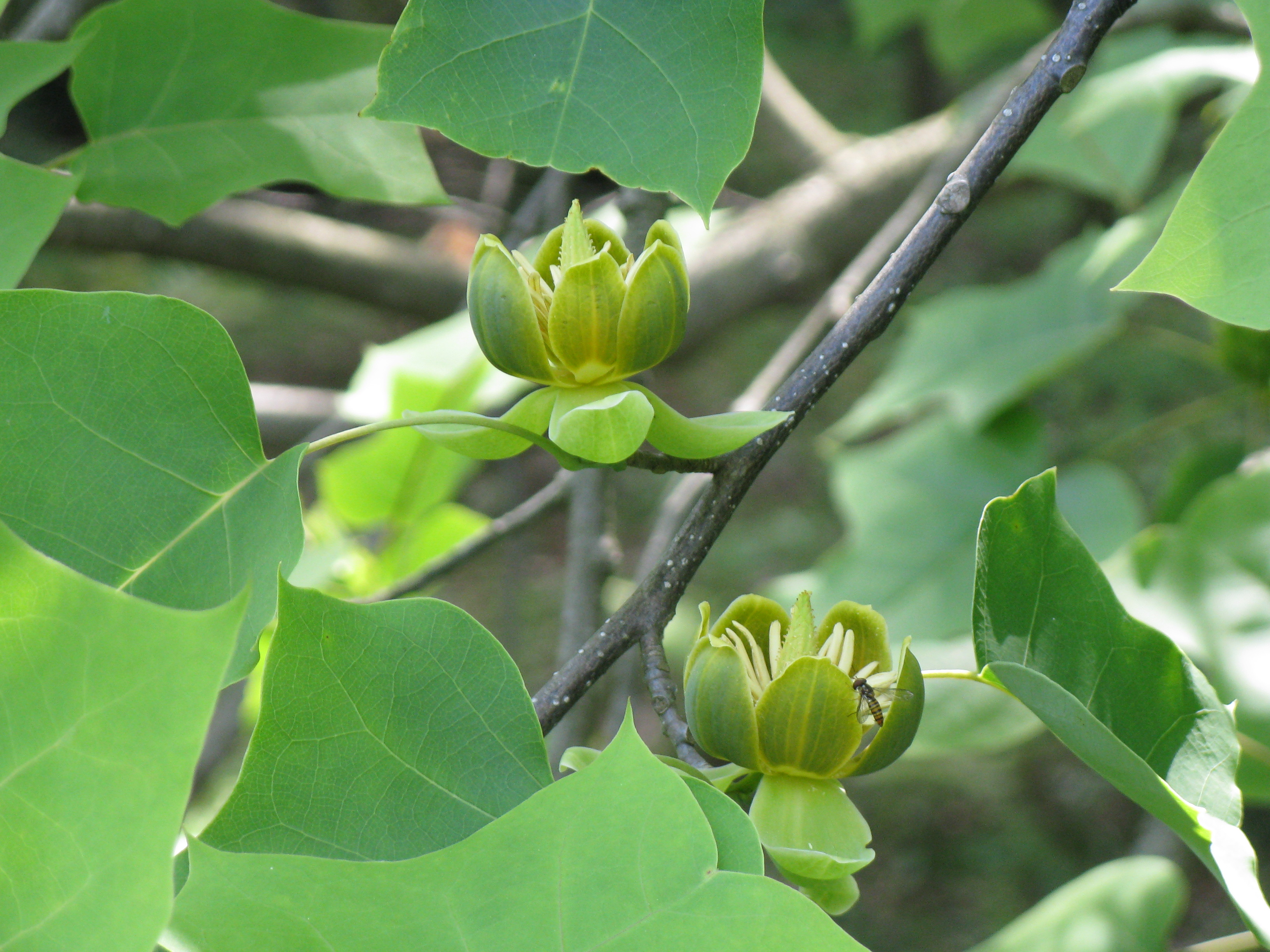
Liriodendron chinense twig with flowers. Notice that the orange pigment characteristic of L. tulipifera petals is absent.

== Description ==
Liriodendron trees are easily recognized by their leaves, which are distinctive, having four lobes in most cases and a cross-cut notched or straight apex. Leaf size varies from 8–22 cm long and 6–25 cm wide. They are deciduous in the vast majority of cases for both species; however, each species has a semi-deciduous variety at the southern limit of its range in Florida and Yunnan respectively. The tulip tree is often a large tree, 18–60 m high and 60–120 cm in diameter. The stoutest well-authenticated Tulip tree was the Liberty Tree in Maryland which was 21.5 feet (6.6 meters) in circumference. It died in 1999. The tree is known to reach the height of 191.8 feet (58.5 meters), in groves where they compete for sunlight, somewhat less if growing in an open field. Its trunk is usually columnar, with a long, branch-free bole forming a compact, rather than open, conical crown of slender branches. It has deep roots that spread widely.

Leaves are slightly larger in L. chinense, compared to L. tulipifera, but with considerable overlap between the species; the petiole is 4–18 cm long. Leaves on young trees tend to be more deeply lobed and larger in size than those on mature trees. In autumn, the leaves turn yellow, or brown and yellow. Both species grow rapidly in rich, moist soils of temperate climates. They hybridize easily, producing L. x sinoamericanum cultivars.

Flowers are 3–10 cm in diameter and have nine tepals — three green outer sepals and six inner petals which are yellow-green, with an orange flare at the base in L. tulipifera and L. x sinoamericanum. They start forming after around 15 years and are superficially similar to a tulip in shape, hence the tree's name. Flowers of L. tulipifera have a faint cucumber odor. The stamens and pistils are arranged spirally around a central spike or gynaecium; the stamens fall off, and the pistils become the samaras. The fruit is a cone-like aggregate of samaras 4–9 cm long, each of which has a roughly tetrahedral seed with one edge attached to the central conical spike and the other edge attached to the wing.

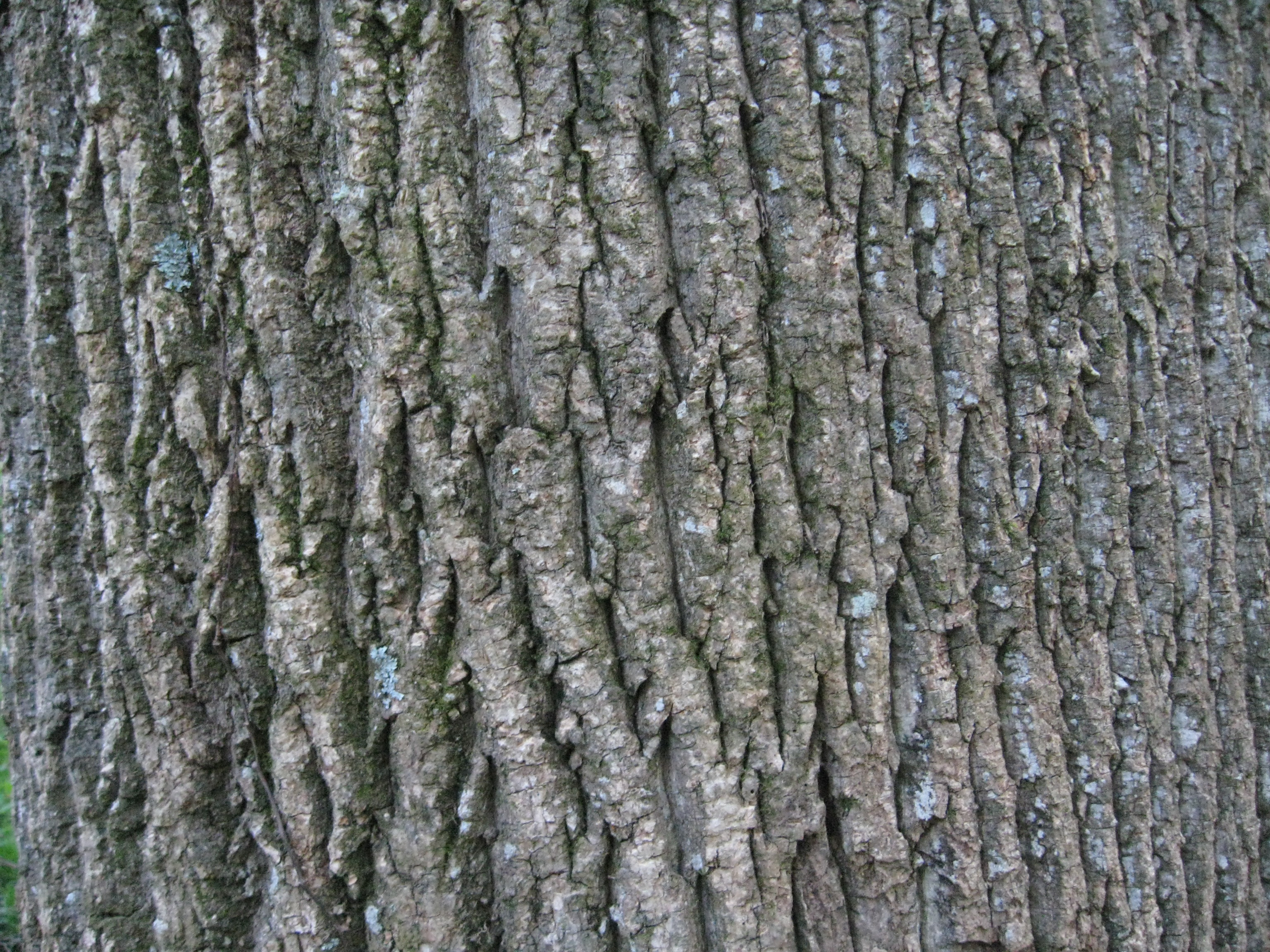
Tulip tree bark

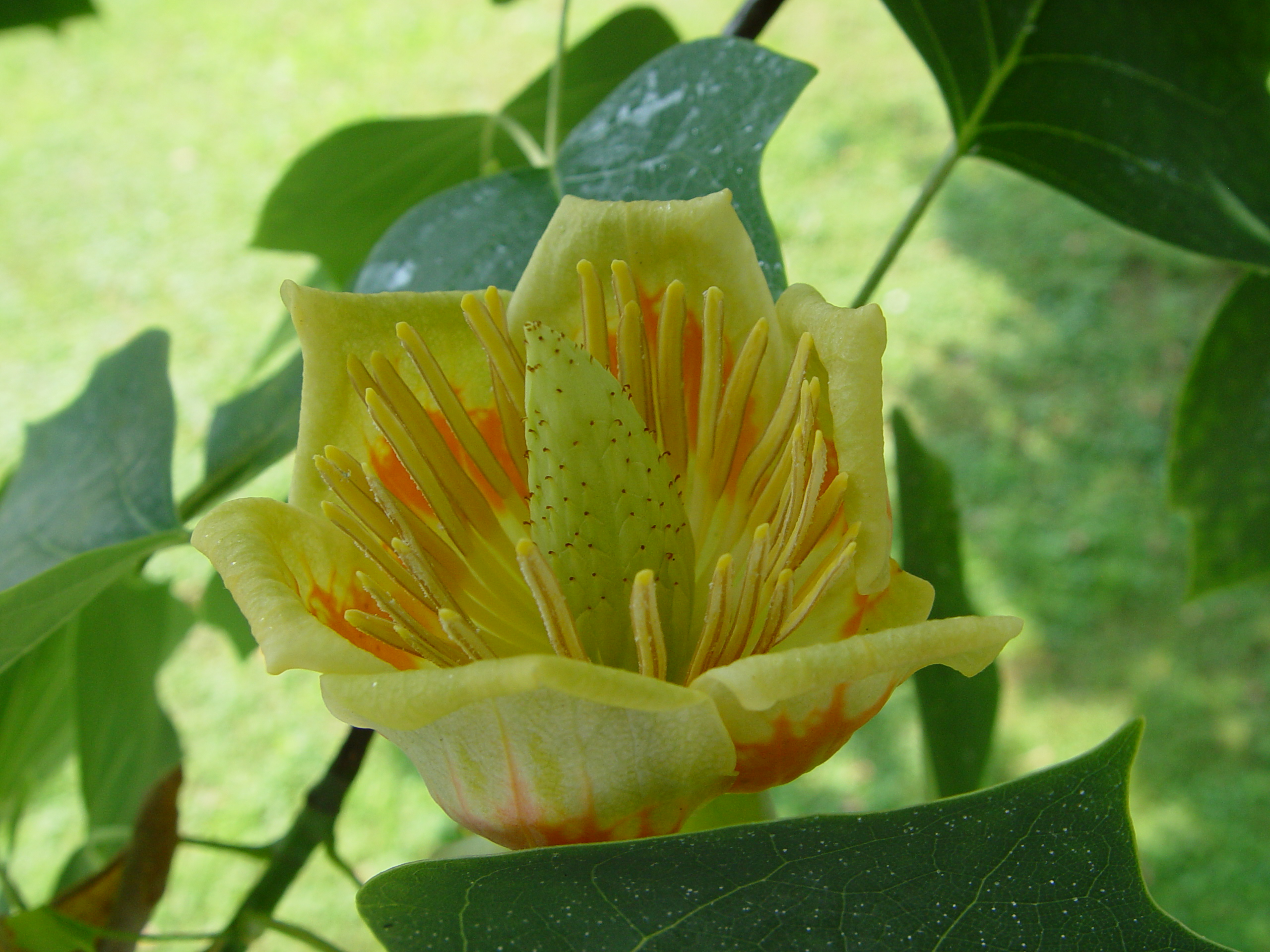
Tulip tree flower

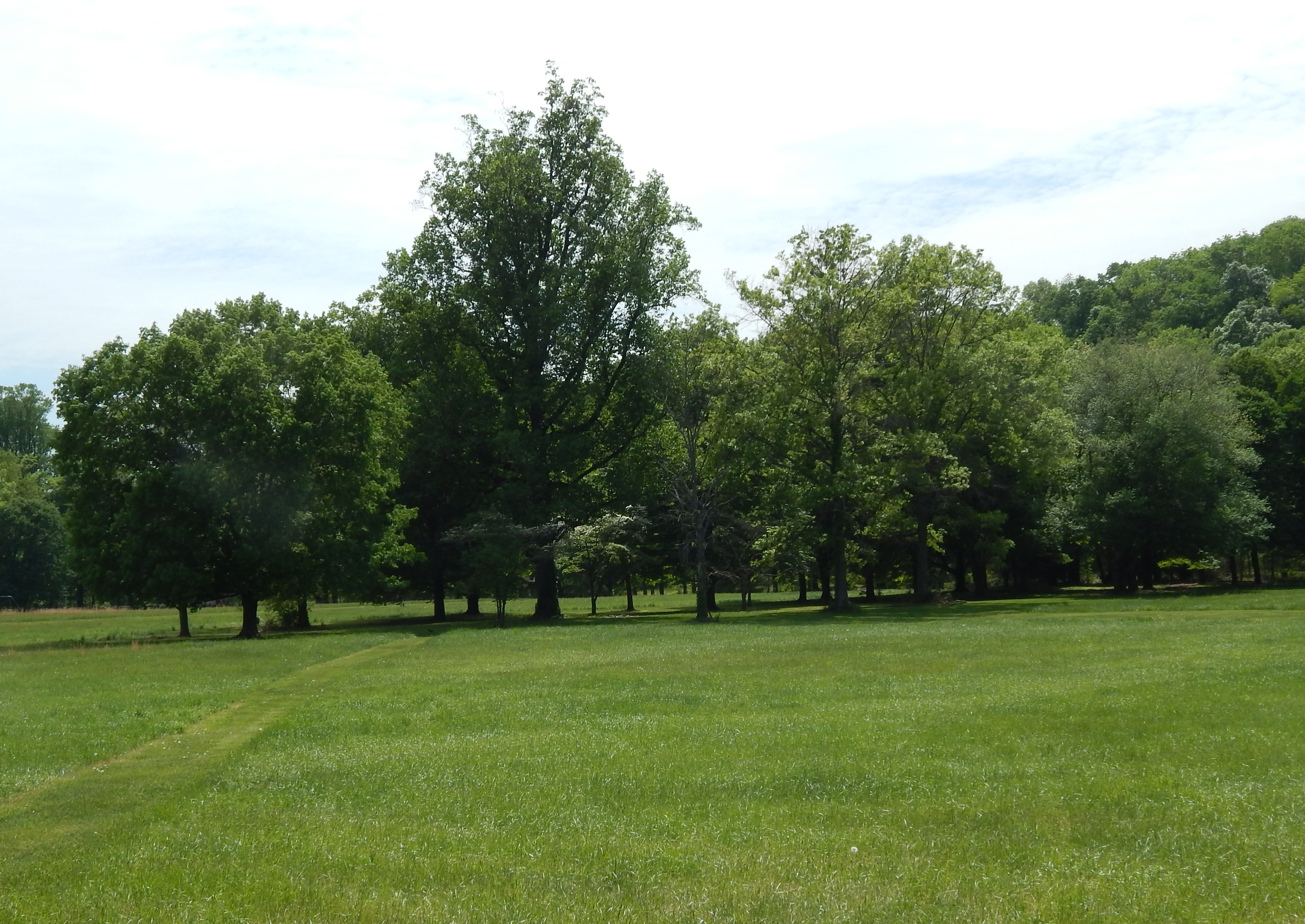
Tulip trees can be very large. This 130-footer in Pennsylvania with a 5-foot trunk dwarfs a group of mature oaks and maples.

=== Cytology ===
The chromosome count of Liriodendron chinense is 2n = 38.

== Taxonomy ==
It was described by Carl Linnaeus in 1753 with Liriodendron tulipifera L. as the type species.

=== Species ===
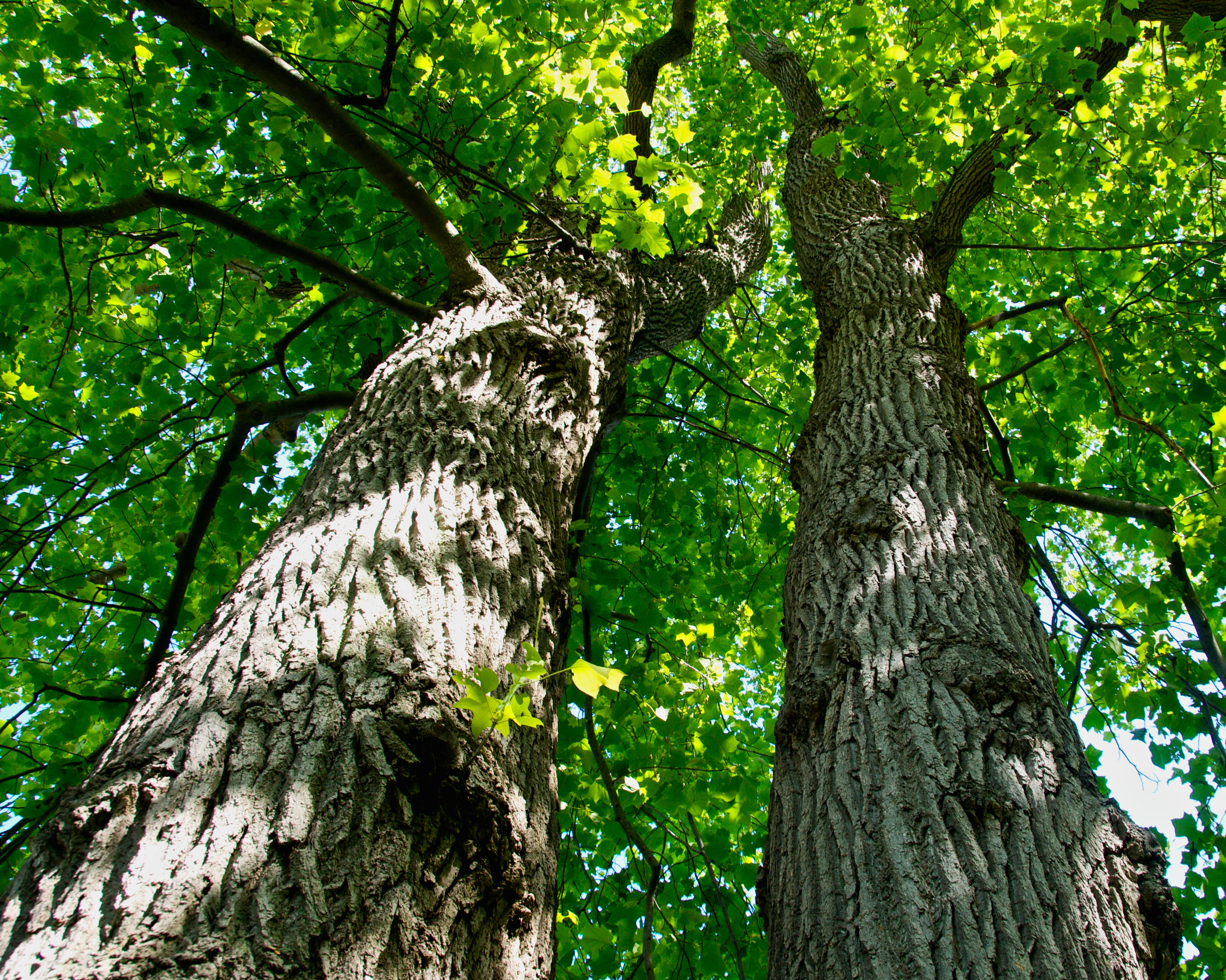
L. tulipifera at Hingham Center Cemetery, Hingham, Massachusetts

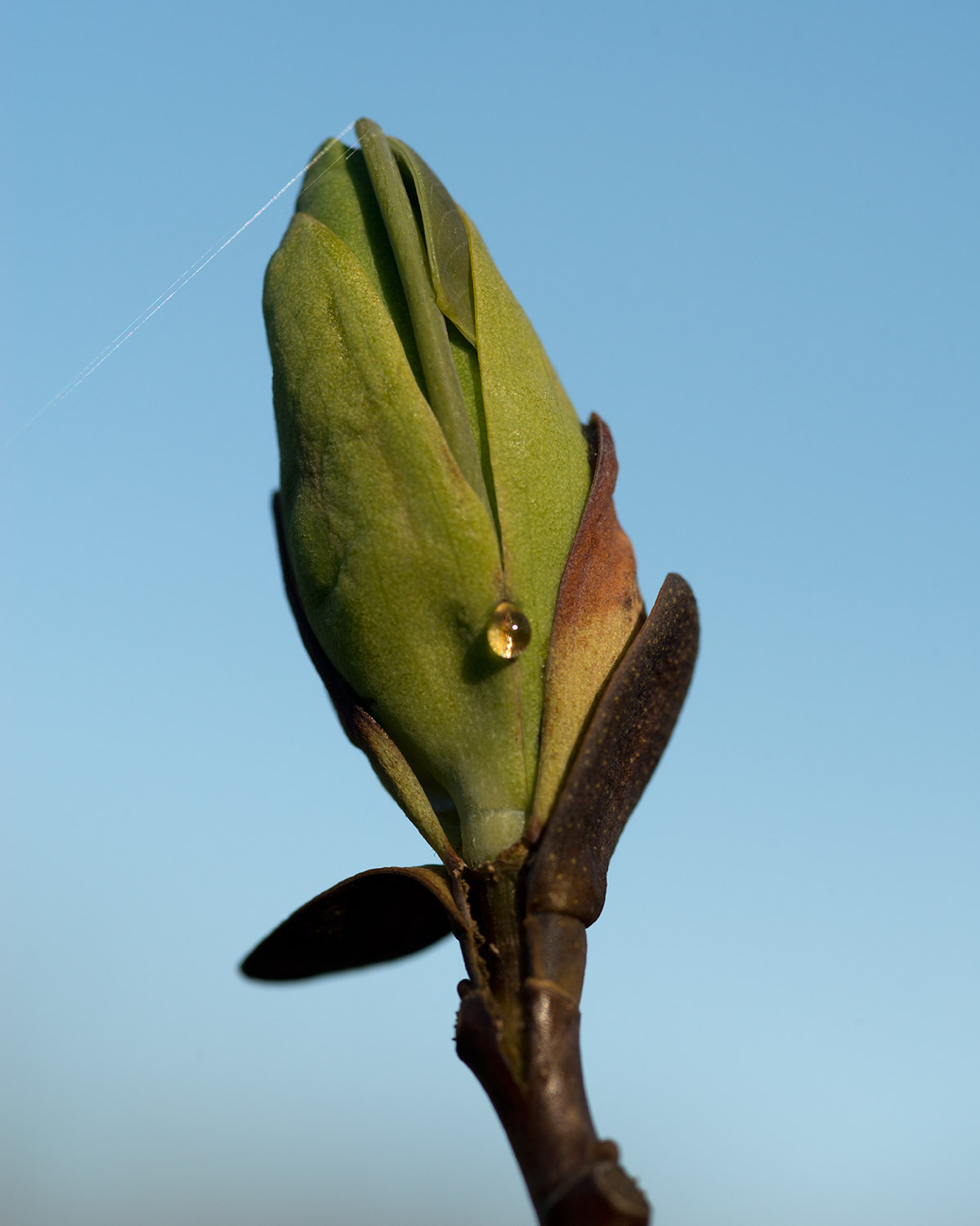
Bud of Liriodendron × sinoamericanum

- †Liriodendron balticum P.I. Dorof.
- Liriodendron chinense (Hemsl.) Sarg.
- Liriodendron tulipifera L.
- Liriodendron × sinoamericanum P.C.Yieh ex C.B.Shang & Zhang R.Wang – an artificial hybrid of L. chinense and L. tulipifera
- †Liriodendron giganteum

=== Etymology ===
The generic name Liriodendron is derived from lirio- meaning lily and -dendron meaning tree.

== Distribution ==
Liriodendron trees are also easily recognized by their general shape, with the higher branches sweeping together in one direction, and they are also recognizable by their height, as the taller ones usually protrude above the canopy of oaks, maples, and other trees—more markedly with the American species. Appalachian cove forests often contain several tulip trees of height and girth not seen in other species of eastern hardwoods.

In the Appalachian cove forests, trees 150 to 165 ft in height are common, and trees from 166 to nearly 180 ft are also found. More Liriodendron over 170 ft in height have been measured by the Eastern Native Tree Society than for any other eastern species. The current tallest tulip tree on record has reached 191.9 ft, the tallest native angiosperm tree known in North America. The tulip tree is rivaled in eastern forests only by white pine, loblolly pine, and eastern hemlock. Reports of tulip trees over 200 ft have been made, but none of the measurements has been confirmed by the Eastern Native Tree Society. Most reflect measurement errors attributable to not accurately locating the highest crown point relative to the base of the tree—a common error made by the users employing only clinometers/hypsometers when measuring height.

Maximum circumferences for the species are between 24 and 30 ft at breast height, although a few historical specimens may have been slightly larger. The Great Smoky Mountains National Park has the greatest population of tulip trees 20 ft and over in circumference. The largest-volume tulip tree known anywhere is the Sag Branch Giant, which has a trunk and limb volume approaching 4,000 ft^{3} (110 m^{3}).

== Paleo history ==
Liriodendrons have been reported as fossils from the Late Cretaceous and early Tertiary of North America and central Asia. They are known widely as Tertiary-age fossils in Europe and well outside their present range in Asia and North America, showing a once-circumpolar northern distribution. Like many "Arcto-Tertiary" genera, Liriodendron apparently became extinct in Europe due to the east-west orientation of its mountains that blocked southward migration during the large-scale glaciation and aridity of climate during glacial phases.

The genus name should not be confused with an extinct genus known only through fossils. That is Lepidodendron, which entails an important group of long-extinct pteridophytes in the phylum Lycopodiophyta that are well known Paleozoic coal-age fossils).

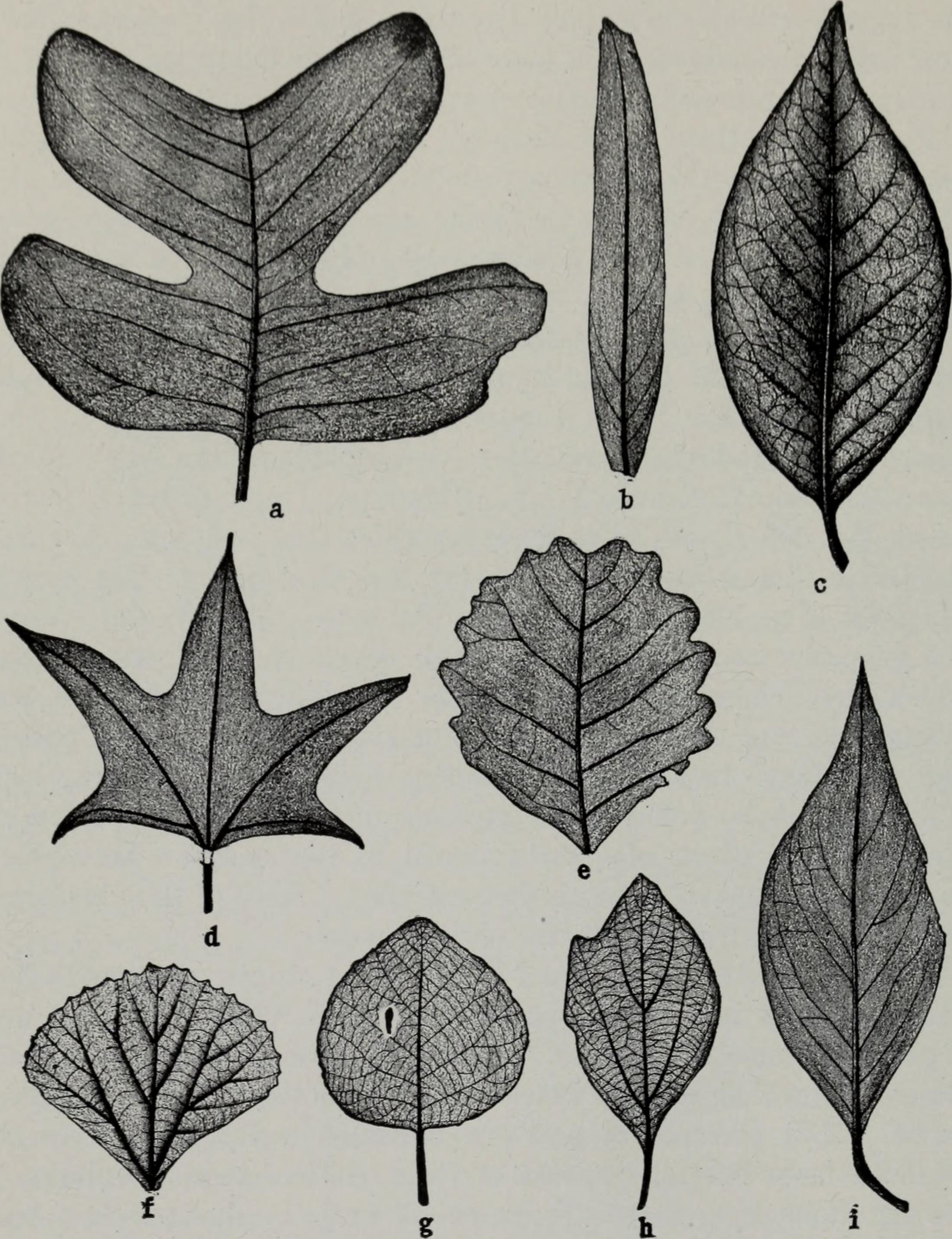
Liriodendron giganteum (a), an extinct Late Cretaceous species.

== Cultivation and use ==
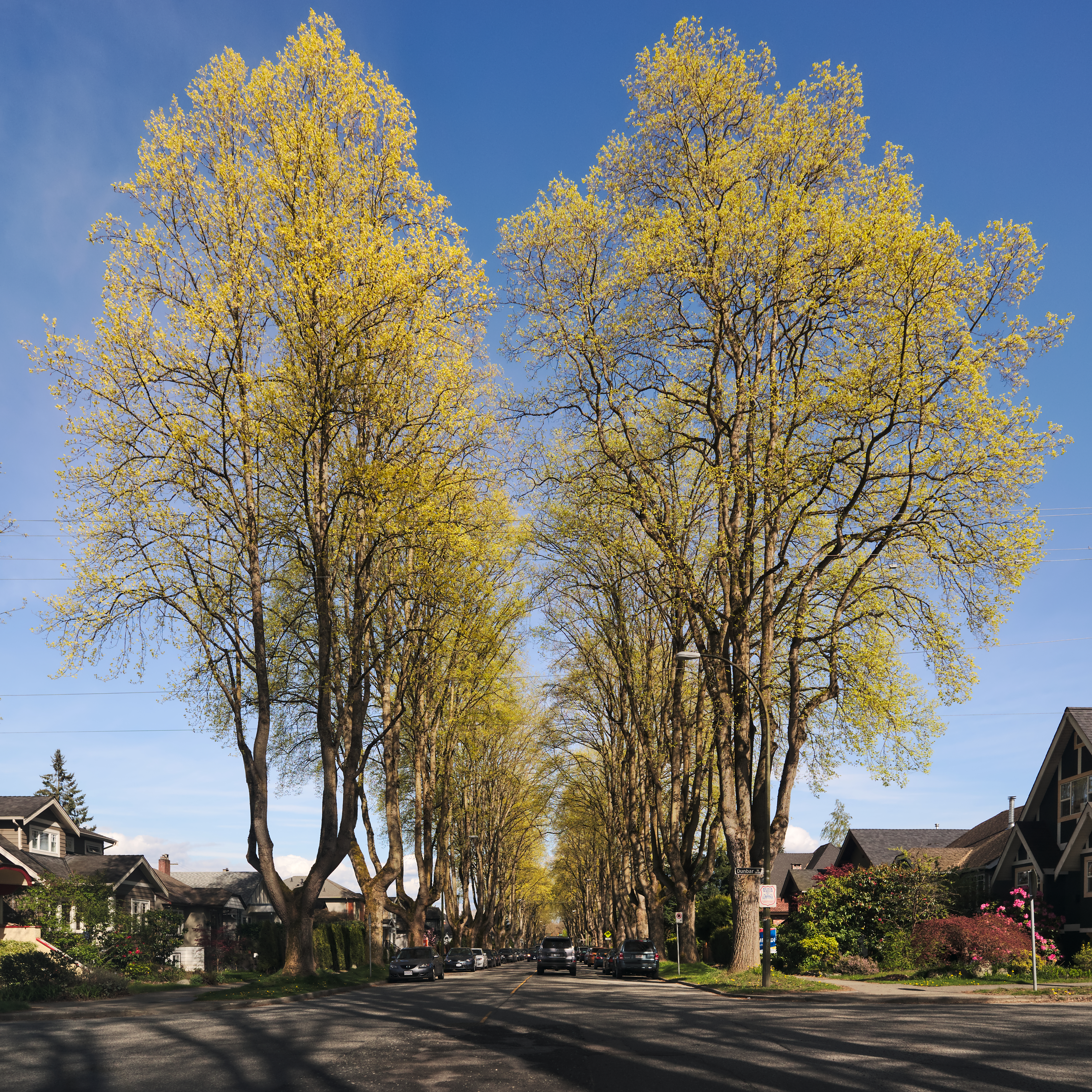
Tulip trees serving an ornamental role in Vancouver.

Liriodendron trees prefer a temperate climate, sun or part shade, and deep, fertile, well-drained and slightly acidic soil. Propagation is by seed or grafting. Plants grown from seed may take more than eight years to flower. Grafted plants flower depending on the age of the scion plant.

The wood of the North American species (called poplar or tulipwood) is fine grained and stable. It is easy to work and commonly used for cabinet and furniture framing, i.e. internal structural members and subsurfaces for veneering. Additionally, much inexpensive furniture, described for sales purposes simply as "hardwood", is in fact primarily stained poplar. In the literature of American furniture manufacturers from the first half of the 20th century, it is often referred to as "gum wood". The wood is only moderately rot-resistant and is not commonly used in shipbuilding, but has found some recent use in light-craft construction. The wood is readily available, and when air dried, has a density around 24 lb/cu ft (0.38 g/cm^{3}).

The name canoewood probably refers to the tree's use for construction of dugout canoes by eastern Native Americans, for which its fine grain and large trunk size is eminently suited.

Tulip tree leaves are eaten by the caterpillars of some Lepidoptera, for example the eastern tiger swallowtail (Papilio glaucus).
