= Dabie Mountains =

Mountain range in China

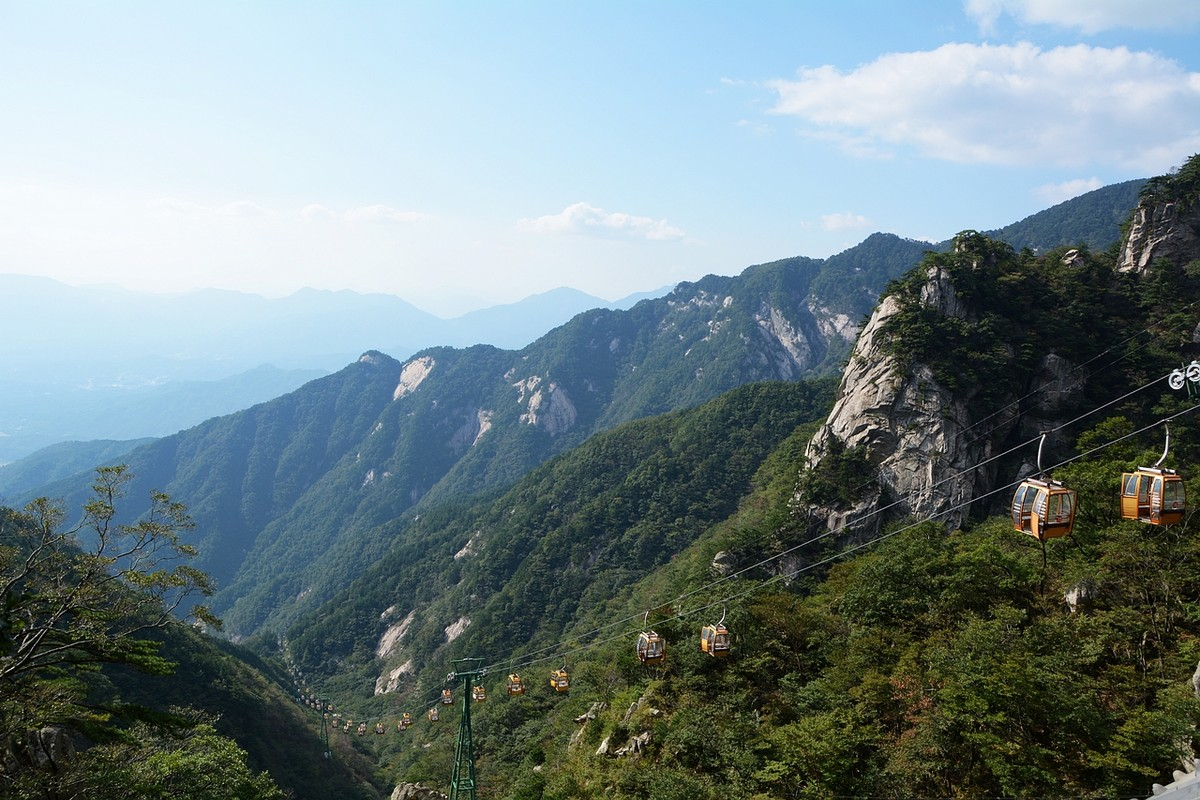
- Tiantangzhai in the Dabie Mountains

Highest point
- Elevation: 1,777 meters (5,830 ft)
- Coordinates: 31°15′N 115°00′E

Geography
- Location within China
- Location: China

The Dabie Mountains (traditional Chinese: 大別山; simplified Chinese: 大别山; pinyin: Dàbié Shān) are a major mountain range located in central China. Running northwest-to-southeast, they form the main watershed between the Huai and Yangtze rivers. The range also marks the boundary between Hubei Province (near Tingqian town) and its neighbors of Henan (to the north) and Anhui (to the east). During the late 1920s and early 1930s, the Dabie Mountains were a stronghold of the Chinese Communist Party and the location of the Eyuwan Soviet.

The western part of the Dabie Mountains has a low elevation of only 1,000–1,300 feet (300–400 meters), though there are a few peaks rising to 3,000 feet (910 meters). The eastern part is higher, averaging more than 3,300 feet (1,000 meters). The highest peak is Baimajian at 1,777 meters (5,830 feet), with several others topping 5,000 feet (1,500 meters) including the 1,729.13 meters (5,673.0 ft) high Tiantangzhai.

== Landscape ==
The range is heavily forested (about 85% coverage) and yields valuable bamboo as well as oak, particularly cork oak, making it China's chief cork-producing area. The region is median income in China, and subsistence agriculture is the heart of its economy with rice and tea predominating.

The main transportation route across the higher range is from Macheng in Hubei to Huangchuan in Henan, through the Huai River valley. The main rail and road crossings go north from provincial capital Wuhan, through the lower elevations.

In 2009, the high-speed Hewu Passenger Railway opened, connecting Hefei and Wuhan along a short and direct route. It uses numerous tunnels when crossing the mountain range.

Other notable major railways lines that passes through the Dabie Mountains include the Beijing-Guangzhou high-speed railway that connects Beijing and Guangzhou via Wuhan. Numerous tunnels are used when crossing the mountain range between Zhumadian and Wuhan.

== Geology ==
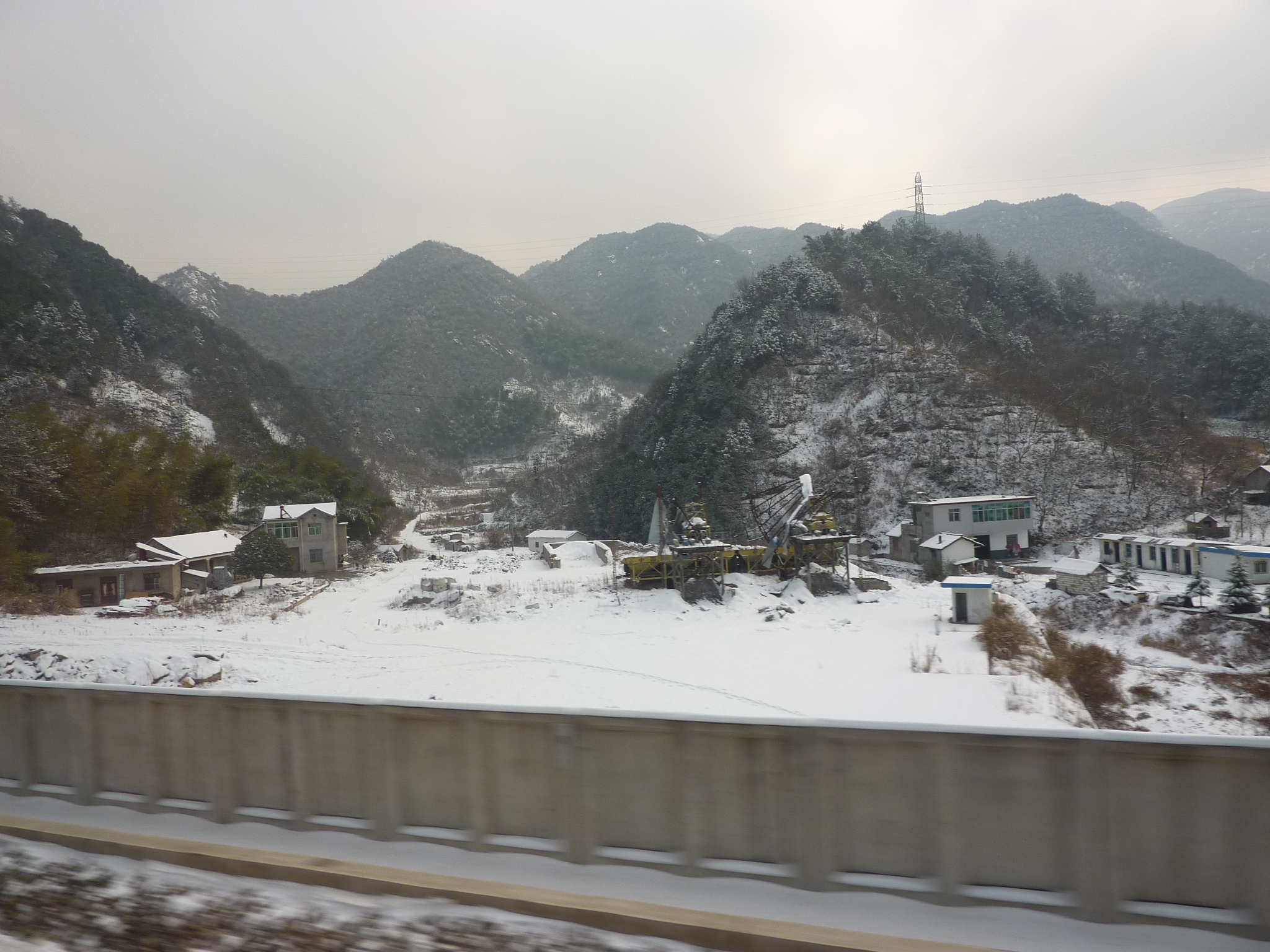
Dabie Mountains in Jinzhai County, Anhui as seen from the Hewu Railway.

Geologically, the Dabie Mountains are characterized by the occurrence of eclogite-facies ultrahigh-pressure metamorphic rocks. Geographically, the range is a complex, stressed structure, making it and the surrounding area subject to earthquakes. In late 2005, a 5.7 magnitude earthquake centered in the northwest corner of Jiangxi province, just south of Jiujiang on the Yangtze killed at least 15 people, injured hundreds, and left several thousand people homeless. It caused tremors in Qichun County in Hubei province and beyond, even reaching as far as the provincial capital of Wuhan.

== International Forest Park ==
This scenic park centered on Tiantangzhai is a key tourist attraction in the highest part of the Dabie mountain range. Total area of the park is 300 square kilometers. Located in Hubei province's Luotian County and close to the border with Anhui Province, the park is about 68 kilometers from Luotian town, 140 kilometers from Macheng, 150 kilometers from Huangshi, and 210 kilometers from the Hubei provincial capital, Wuhan.

== Works cited ==
- 陈云增. "大别山" [Dabie Shan]. 中国大百科全书 [Encyclopedia of China] (in Chinese) (3rd ed.).
