= Nanxi, Anhui =

Nanxi 南溪镇
- Town
- Location in China
- Coordinates: 31°30′37″N 115°38′05″E
- Country: People's Republic of China
- Province: Anhui
- Prefecture-level city: Lu'an
- County: Jinzhai County
- Time zone: UTC+8 (China Standard)

Nanxi (Chinese: 南溪; pinyin: Nánxī) is a town in Jinzhai County, Anhui province, China. As of 2020, it administers Nanxi Street Neighborhood and the following 11 villages:

- Nanxi Village
- Yushan Village (余山村)
- Wuwan Village (吴湾村)
- Dingbu Village (丁埠村)
- Hengfan Village (横畈村)
- Menqian Village (门前村)
- Caofan Village (曹畈村)
- Mahe Village (麻河村)
- Shizhai Village (石寨村)
- Nanwan Village (南湾村)
- Huayuan Village (花园村)

== See also ==
- List of township-level divisions of Anhui
