= Jinzhai County =

Jinzhai 金寨县
- County
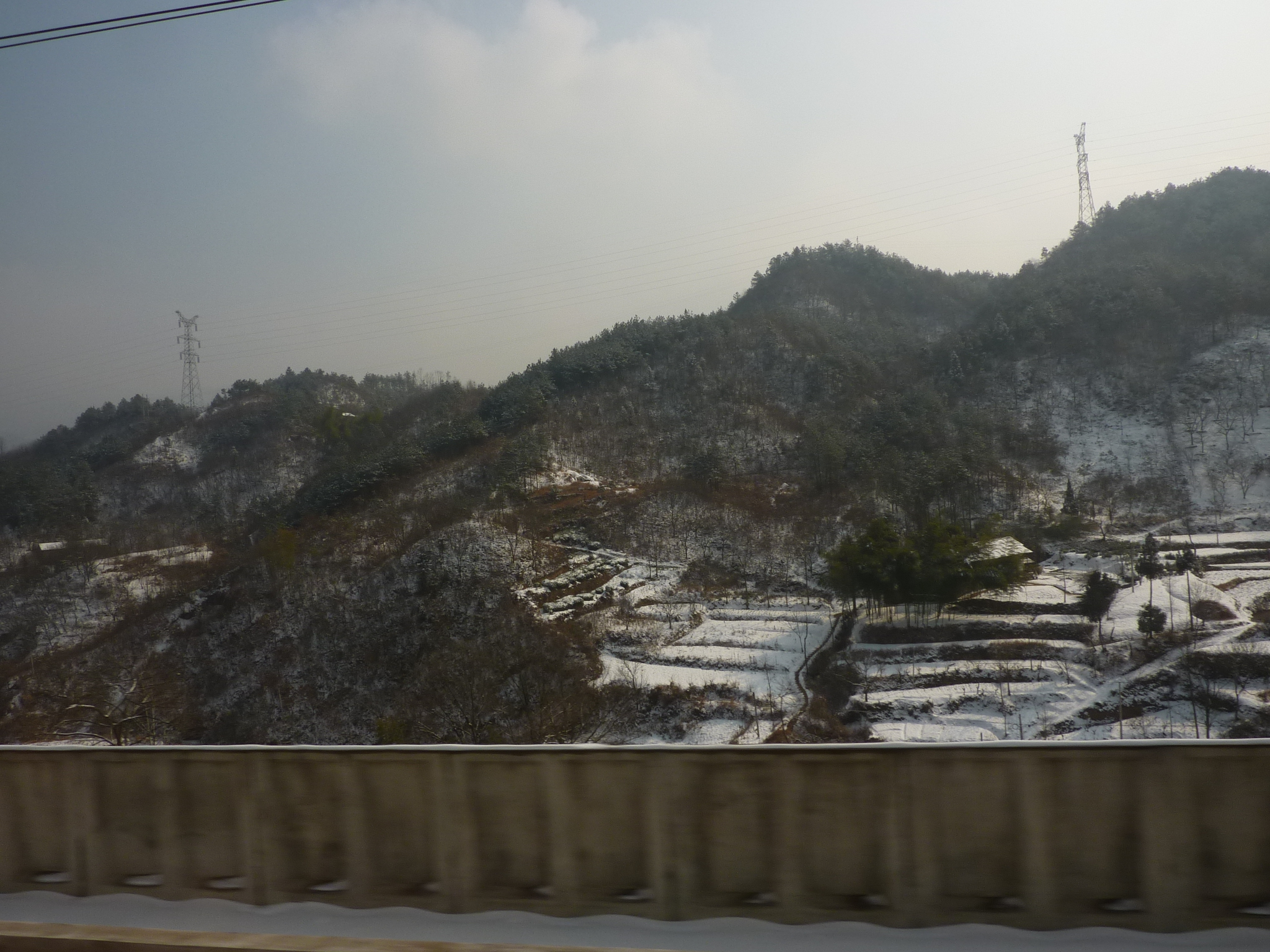
- Dabie Mountains landscape in Jinzhai, seen from the Hewu Railway

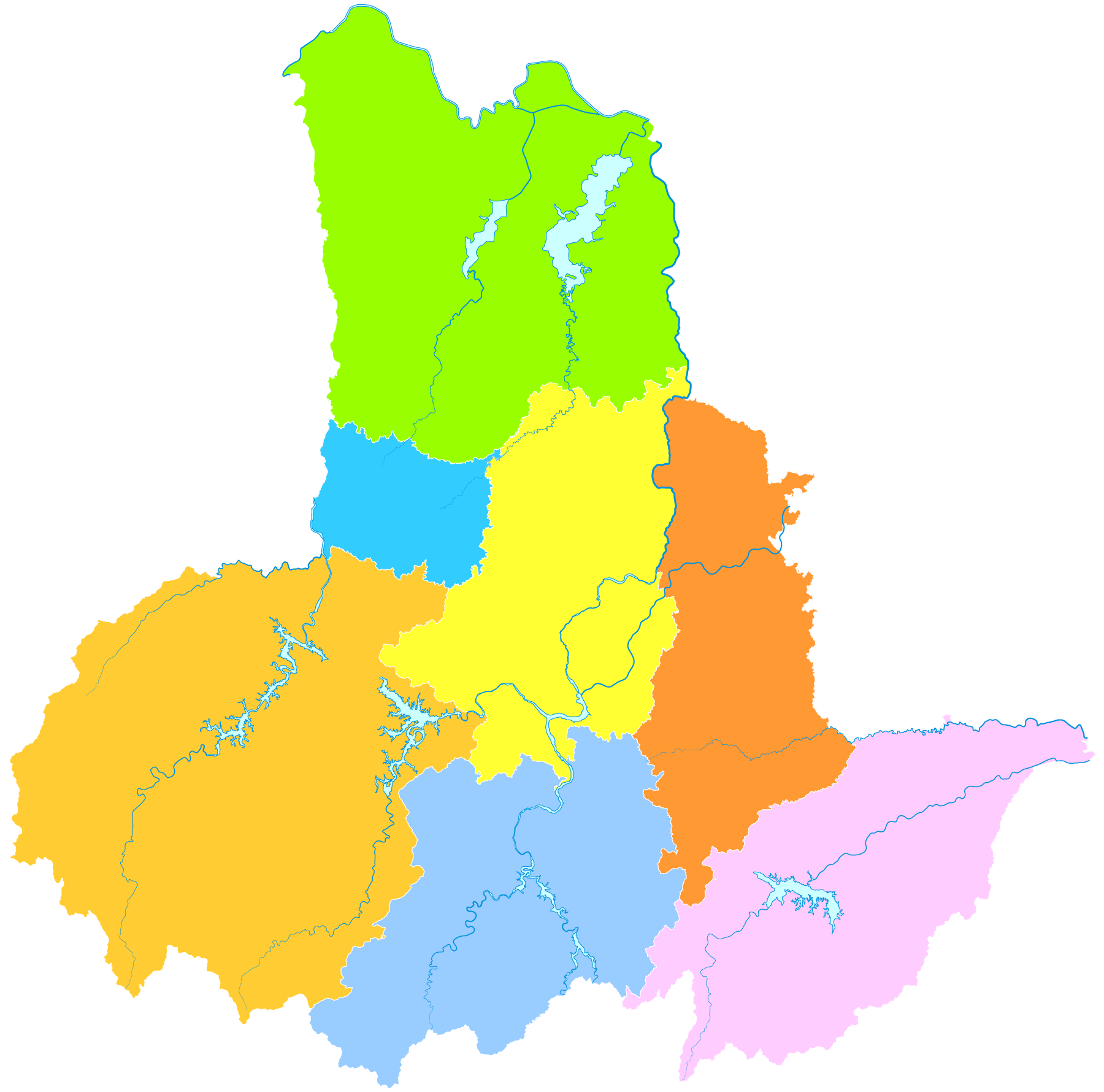
- Jinzhai is the westernmost division in this map of Lu'an

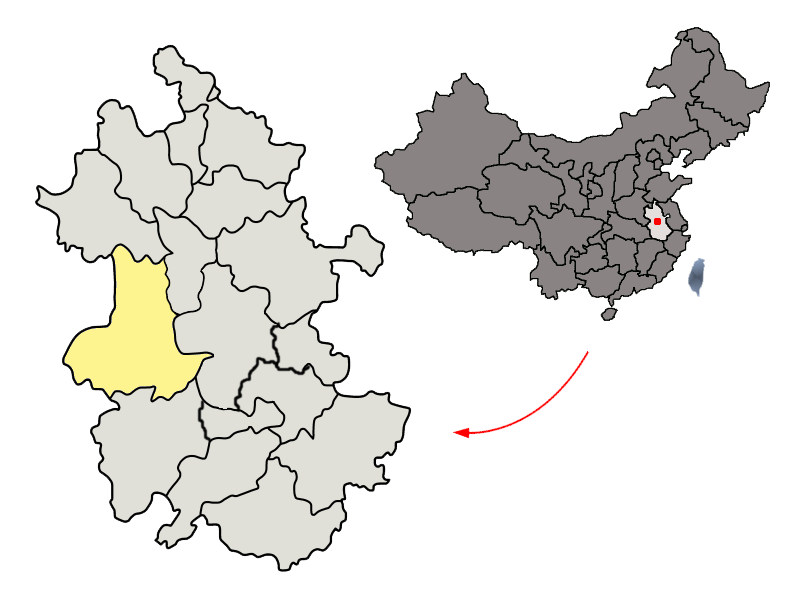
- Lu'an in Anhui
- Coordinates: 31°43′37″N 115°56′02″E
- Country: People's Republic of China
- Province: Anhui
- Prefecture-level city: Lu'an

Area
  - Total: 3,814 km^{2} (1,473 sq mi)

Population (2018)
  - Total: 683,500
  - Density: 179.2/km^{2} (464.1/sq mi)
- Time zone: UTC+8 (China Standard)
- Postal code: 237300

Jinzhai County (simplified Chinese: 金寨县; traditional Chinese: 金寨縣; pinyin: Jīnzhài Xiàn), previously Lihuang County (simplified Chinese: 立煌县; traditional Chinese: 立煌縣, named after Wei Lihuang), is a county in the west of Anhui Province, People's Republic of China, bordering the provinces of Henan to the northwest and Hubei to the southwest. It is under the jurisdiction of the prefecture-level city of Lu'an, and has a population of 640,000 and an area of 3,667 square kilometres (1,416 sq mi). The government of Jinzhai County was in Meishan Town before 2006 when it relocated to nearby Jiangdian Town. The county has jurisdiction over nine towns and ten townships.

Jinzhai County is known as "the cradle of generals" (将军摇篮; 將軍搖籃) as 59 men from the area have reached that rank in the People's Liberation Army (PLA).

== Geography ==
Jinzhai County lies on the joint border of Anhui, Henan and Hubei Provinces. Its mountainous terrain attracts tourists for its rugged beauty with the highest mountain, Tiantangzhai rising to a height of 1,729.13 metres (5,673.0 ft).

The county is served by the Hewu Railway.

== Climate ==
Climate data for Jinzhai, elevation 95 m (312 ft), (1991–2020 normals, extremes 1981–2010)
Month	Jan	Feb	Mar	Apr	May	Jun	Jul	Aug	Sep	Oct	Nov	Dec	Year
Record high °C (°F)	22.8 (73.0)	28.9 (84.0)	33.8 (92.8)	34.8 (94.6)	37.0 (98.6)	38.8 (101.8)	41.6 (106.9)	40.1 (104.2)	38.3 (100.9)	34.9 (94.8)	30.2 (86.4)	25.1 (77.2)	41.6 (106.9)
Mean daily maximum °C (°F)	7.8 (46.0)	10.7 (51.3)	16.2 (61.2)	22.7 (72.9)	27.1 (80.8)	30.0 (86.0)	32.6 (90.7)	31.4 (88.5)	27.5 (81.5)	22.5 (72.5)	16.5 (61.7)	10.4 (50.7)	21.3 (70.3)
Daily mean °C (°F)	3.3 (37.9)	5.8 (42.4)	10.7 (51.3)	16.8 (62.2)	21.6 (70.9)	25.1 (77.2)	28.0 (82.4)	26.9 (80.4)	22.5 (72.5)	17.1 (62.8)	11.2 (52.2)	5.6 (42.1)	16.2 (61.2)
Mean daily minimum °C (°F)	0.4 (32.7)	2.4 (36.3)	6.7 (44.1)	12.3 (54.1)	17.4 (63.3)	21.3 (70.3)	24.6 (76.3)	23.8 (74.8)	19.3 (66.7)	13.6 (56.5)	7.7 (45.9)	2.4 (36.3)	12.7 (54.8)
Record low °C (°F)	−9.3 (15.3)	−9.1 (15.6)	−3.0 (26.6)	0.0 (32.0)	7.4 (45.3)	11.4 (52.5)	17.8 (64.0)	15.6 (60.1)	10.8 (51.4)	2.4 (36.3)	−5.0 (23.0)	−8.6 (16.5)	−9.3 (15.3)
Average precipitation mm (inches)	56.7 (2.23)	62.7 (2.47)	98.5 (3.88)	103.8 (4.09)	126.5 (4.98)	205.4 (8.09)	256.6 (10.10)	216.7 (8.53)	104.4 (4.11)	76.9 (3.03)	63.3 (2.49)	36.7 (1.44)	1,408.2 (55.44)
Average precipitation days (≥ 0.1 mm)	9.4	10.2	11.7	10.9	12.4	12.2	14.2	14.7	10.7	9.7	8.9	7.8	132.8
Average snowy days	5.3	3.3	1.3	0.1	0	0	0	0	0	0	0.5	2.0	12.5
Average relative humidity (%)	72	73	69	68	72	77	78	81	79	76	73	70	74
Mean monthly sunshine hours	121.0	117.6	149.9	179.7	186.0	172.2	193.7	179.0	156.6	156.7	144.2	135.2	1,891.8
Percentage possible sunshine	38	37	40	46	44	41	45	44	43	45	46	43	43
Source: China Meteorological Administration

== Administrative divisions ==
In the present, Jinzhai County has 11 towns and 12 townships.

11 Towns

- Meishan (梅山镇)
- Shuanghe (双河镇)
- Nanxi (南溪镇)
- Gubei (古碑镇)
- Qingshan (青山镇)
- Tiantangzhai (天堂寨镇)
- Wujiadian (吴家店镇)
- Mabu (麻埠镇)
- Tangjiahui (汤家汇镇)
- Banzhuyuan (斑竹园镇)
- Yanzihe (燕子河镇)

12 Townships

- Baitafan (白塔畈乡)
- Youfangdian (油坊店乡)
- Huaishuwan (槐树湾乡)
- Huashi (花石乡)
- Shahe (沙河乡)
- Taoling (桃岭乡)
- Tiechong (铁冲乡)
- Changling (长岭乡)
- Zhangchong (张冲乡)
- Guanmiao (关庙乡)
- Guoziyuan (果子园乡)
- Quanjun (全军乡)
