= Luotian County =

Luotian County 罗田县 Lotien
- County
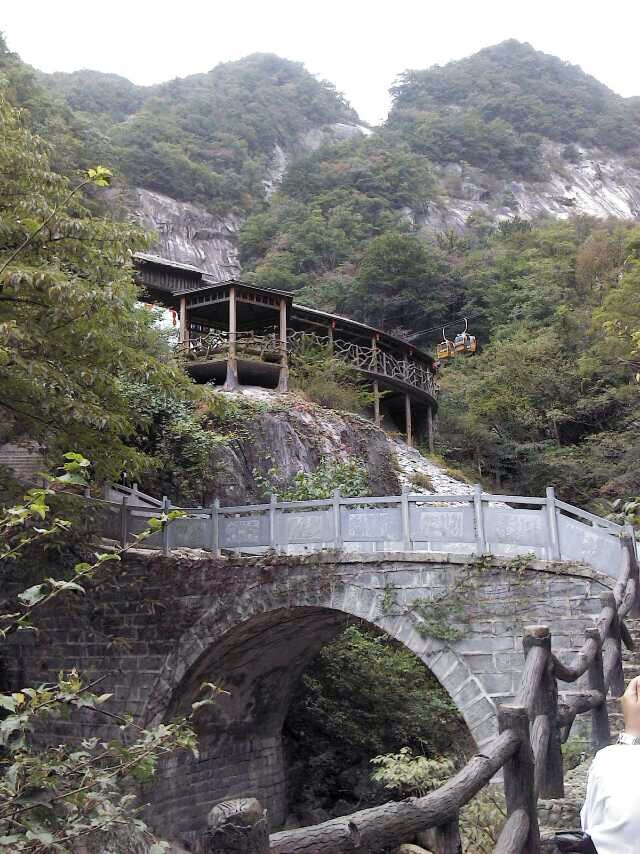
- Tiantangzhai Forest Park

- Location of the seat in Hubei
- Coordinates: 30°47′03″N 115°23′57″E
- Country: People's Republic of China
- Province: Hubei
- Prefecture-level city: Huanggang

Area
  - Total: 2,144 km^{2} (828 sq mi)

Population (2020)
  - Total: 473,195
  - Density: 220.7/km^{2} (571.6/sq mi)
- Time zone: UTC+8 (China Standard)
- Postal code: 438600
- Website: 罗田县政府门户网站 (Luotian County Government Web Portal) (in Simplified Chinese)

Luotian County (simplified Chinese: 罗田县; traditional Chinese: 羅田縣; pinyin: Luótián Xiàn) is a county that is located in the northeast of Hubei province, China and it is under the administration of Huanggang City. The county is on the south side of the Dabie Mountains with the highest peak, Tiantangzhai (1,729 m or 5,673 ft), situated in the northeastern part of the county. Luotian county covers an area of 2,144 square kilometres (828 sq mi) and had a population of about 500,000 in 2020. The Dabie Mountains attract thousands of tourists from all over the province every year and the most popular tourist sites include Tiantangzhai National Forest Park, Bodaofeng National Forest Park, and Sanlifan Hot Spring.

== Geography ==
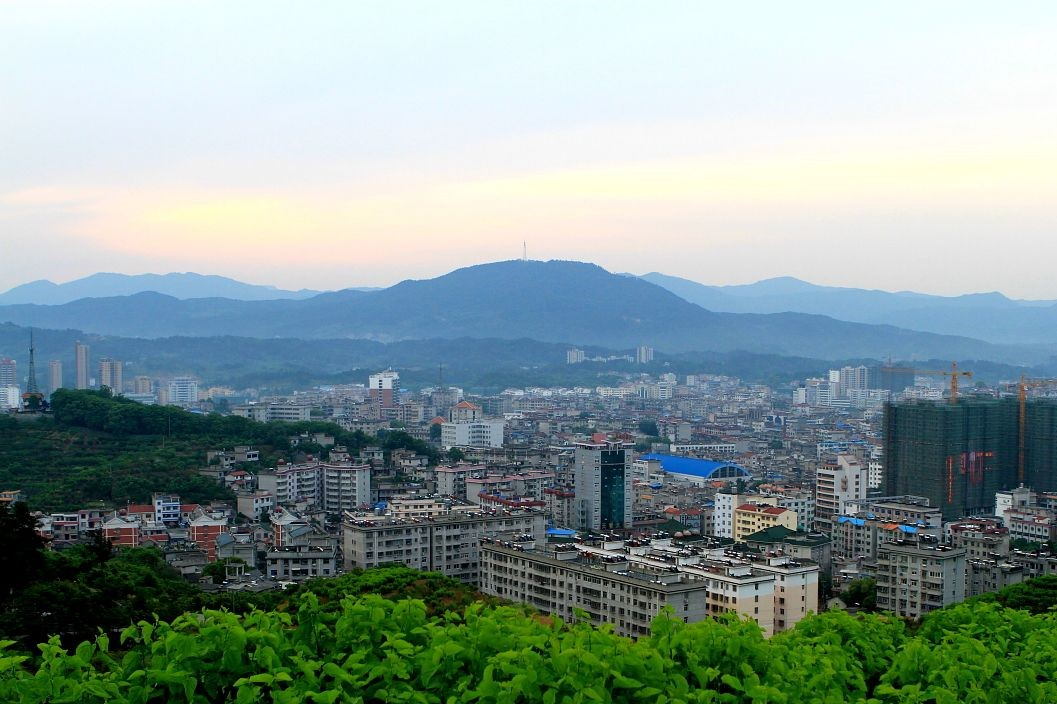
Fengshan town, county seat of Luotian

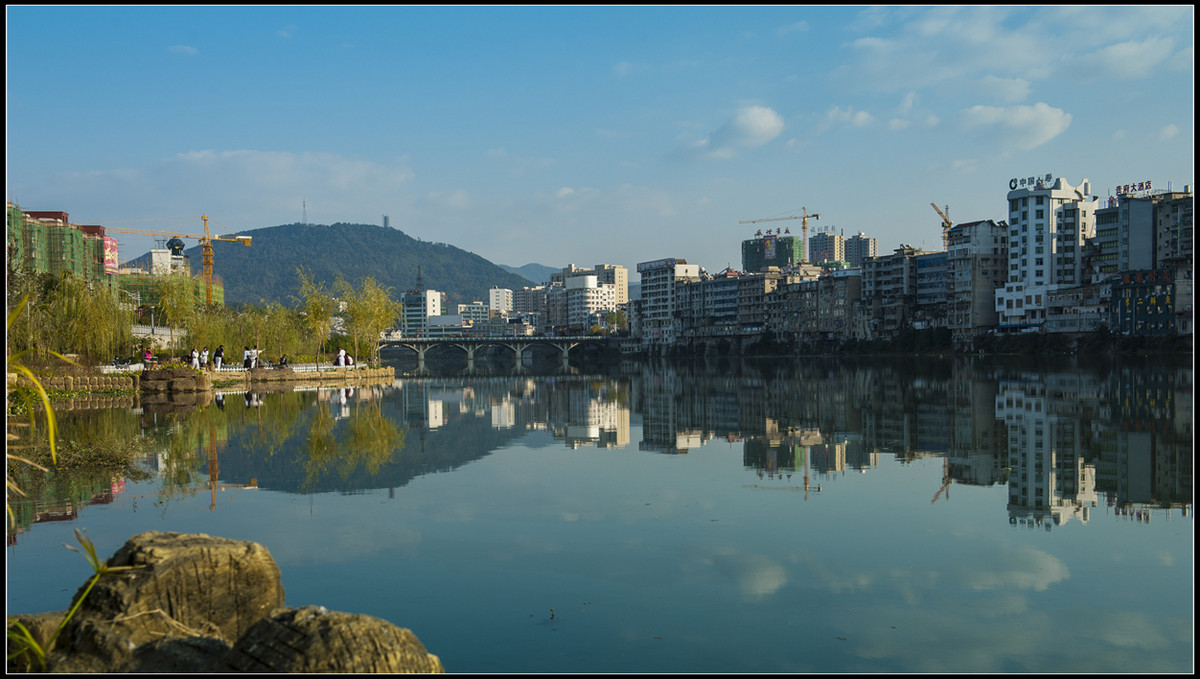
Yishui River in downtown Luotian

Luotian is located in the northeast of Hubei Province and it is separated from Anhui Province by the Dabie mountains in the north. Most of its area is mountainous and 70% of the land is covered by forests. Five rivers originate from the Dabie mountains and flow to the southwest. They converge into the Ba River and then into the Yangtze River.

Luotian County has a subtropical monsoon climate with wet winters and rainy summers. The average annual temperature is about 16.4 °C and the average annual rainfall of the county is 1330 mm. Luotian is rich in water resources with several reservoirs such as: Tiantang reservoir in the north and Bailian reservoir in the south of the county.

The neighboring counties are: Yingshan County to the east, Xishui County to the south, Tuanfeng County to the west and Ma Cheng to the northwest. Huangzhou district (city seat of Huanggang) is 70 km (43 mi) to the southwest and the provincial capital, Wuhan is about 105 km (65 mi) to the west.

=== Administrative divisions ===
Luotian County administers:

#	Name	Chinese (S)
Towns
1	Fengshan	凤山镇
2	Luotuo'ao	骆驼坳镇
3	Dahe'an	大河岸镇
4	Jiuzihe	九资河镇
5	Shengli Victory	胜利镇
6	Hepu	河铺镇
7	Sanlifan	三里畈镇
8	Kuanghe	匡河镇
9	Baimiaohe	白庙河镇
10	Daqi	大崎镇
Townships
11	Bailianhe White Lotus River	白莲河乡
12	Pinghu	平湖乡

== Climate ==
Climate data for Luotian, elevation 123 m (404 ft), (1991–2020 normals, extremes 1981–present)
Month	Jan	Feb	Mar	Apr	May	Jun	Jul	Aug	Sep	Oct	Nov	Dec	Year
Record high °C (°F)	22.0 (71.6)	27.9 (82.2)	34.8 (94.6)	34.1 (93.4)	36.2 (97.2)	37.9 (100.2)	39.7 (103.5)	40.2 (104.4)	38.8 (101.8)	35.9 (96.6)	30.5 (86.9)	23.9 (75.0)	40.2 (104.4)
Mean daily maximum °C (°F)	9.3 (48.7)	12.2 (54.0)	16.7 (62.1)	23.1 (73.6)	27.6 (81.7)	30.2 (86.4)	33.1 (91.6)	33.2 (91.8)	29.7 (85.5)	24.2 (75.6)	18.1 (64.6)	11.8 (53.2)	22.4 (72.4)
Daily mean °C (°F)	4.2 (39.6)	6.9 (44.4)	11.2 (52.2)	17.2 (63.0)	22.0 (71.6)	25.4 (77.7)	28.3 (82.9)	27.8 (82.0)	23.8 (74.8)	17.9 (64.2)	11.7 (53.1)	6.0 (42.8)	16.9 (62.4)
Mean daily minimum °C (°F)	0.7 (33.3)	3.0 (37.4)	7.0 (44.6)	12.6 (54.7)	17.5 (63.5)	21.5 (70.7)	24.5 (76.1)	23.9 (75.0)	19.6 (67.3)	13.6 (56.5)	7.5 (45.5)	2.0 (35.6)	12.8 (55.0)
Record low °C (°F)	−9.3 (15.3)	−6.6 (20.1)	−5.1 (22.8)	1.8 (35.2)	6.5 (43.7)	11.8 (53.2)	17.2 (63.0)	16.0 (60.8)	9.1 (48.4)	1.1 (34.0)	−4.3 (24.3)	−11.6 (11.1)	−11.6 (11.1)
Average precipitation mm (inches)	52.3 (2.06)	64.9 (2.56)	97.9 (3.85)	138.4 (5.45)	158.3 (6.23)	223.3 (8.79)	251.9 (9.92)	121.6 (4.79)	82.0 (3.23)	62.5 (2.46)	50.7 (2.00)	31.5 (1.24)	1,335.3 (52.58)
Average precipitation days (≥ 0.1 mm)	10.2	10.0	12.9	11.7	12.5	13.2	12.8	11.8	8.3	8.3	9.2	7.1	128
Average snowy days	3.3	1.8	0.7	0	0	0	0	0	0	0	0.2	1.0	7
Average relative humidity (%)	76	75	74	74	76	81	80	79	76	75	76	73	76
Mean monthly sunshine hours	99.5	97.9	122.3	150.9	162.1	146.9	191.8	197.9	162.8	154.5	135.9	123.9	1,746.4
Percentage possible sunshine	31	31	33	39	38	35	45	49	44	44	43	39	39
Source: China Meteorological Administration

== History ==
In the year of 523, (Southern and Northern dynasties of China), Luotian County was first founded in the Liang dynasty.

In 621, (Tang dynasty) the county was incorporated into Lan Xi County.

In 1093, (Song dynasty) Luotian County was refounded and belonged to Qichun prefecture.

During the Yuan dynasty, the county was occupied by Mongolia and revoked. Later it was re-established in 1275.

During the Ming dynasty, the jurisdiction of the county was changed from Qichun to Huangzhou prefecture.

During the Qing dynasty, the county is under the administration of Huangzhou prefecture.

During the Republic of China, Luotian is under the administration of Eastern Hubei prefecture.

In March 1949, the county was liberated and since then under the administration of Huanggang prefecture.

In 1995, the Huanggang prefecture was changed into prefecture-level city.

== Economy ==
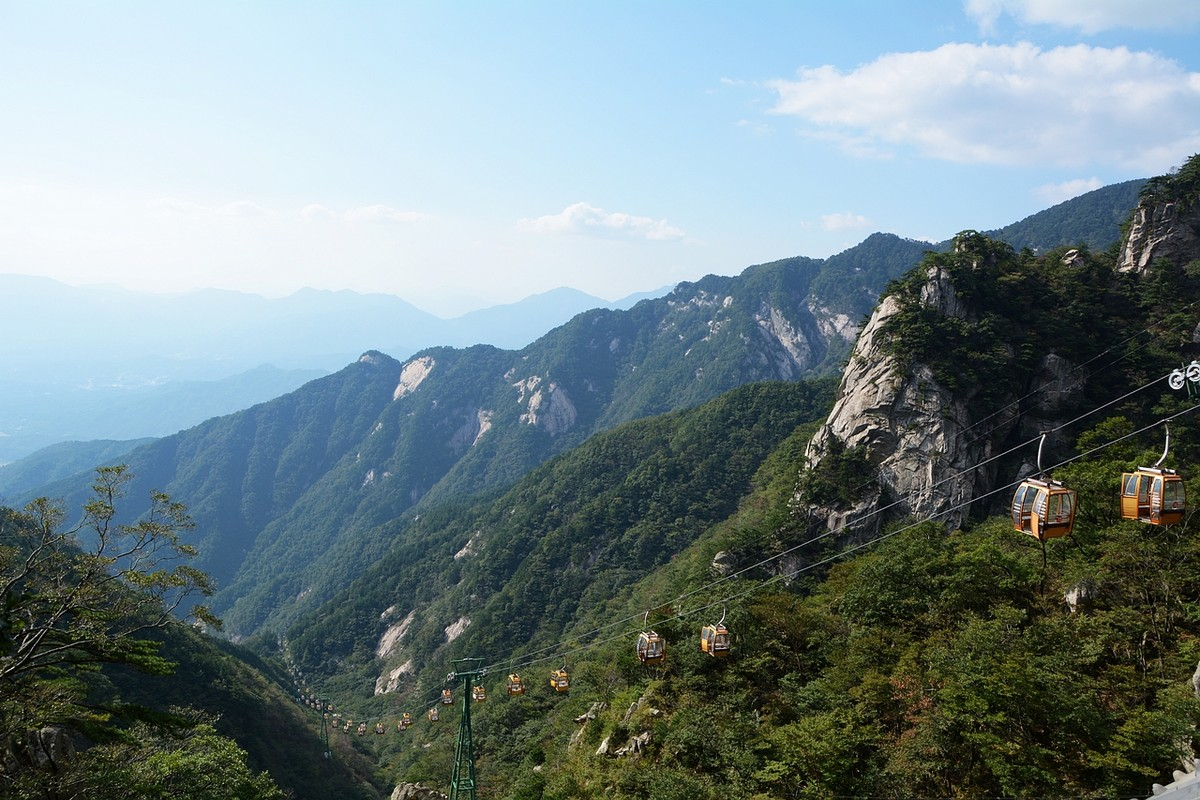
Tiantangzhai National Forest Park

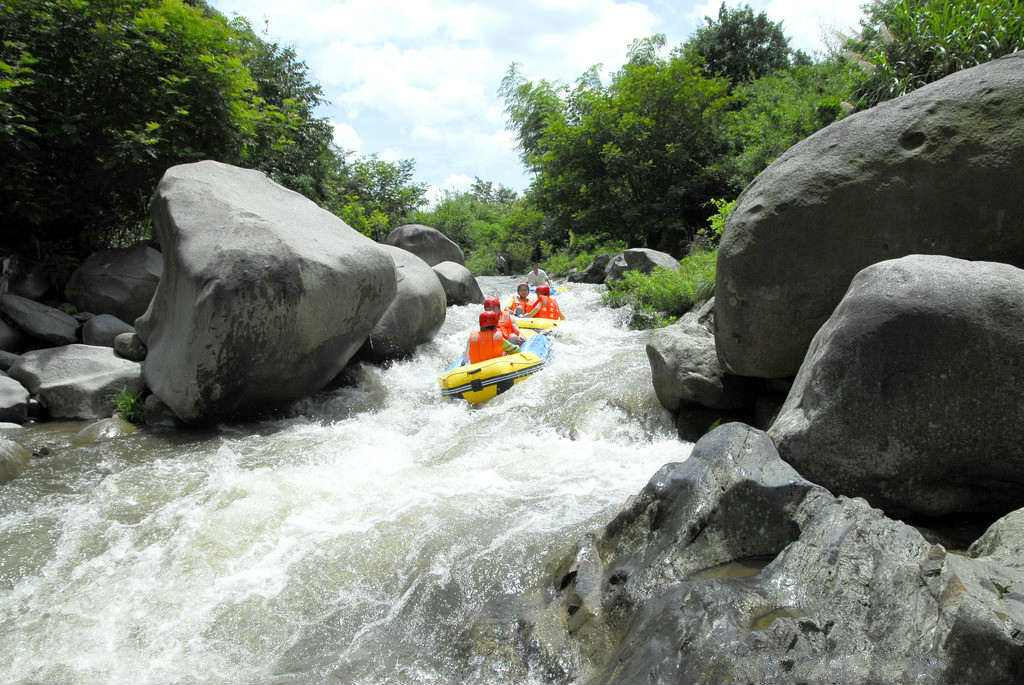
Rafting on the river of Jinshi

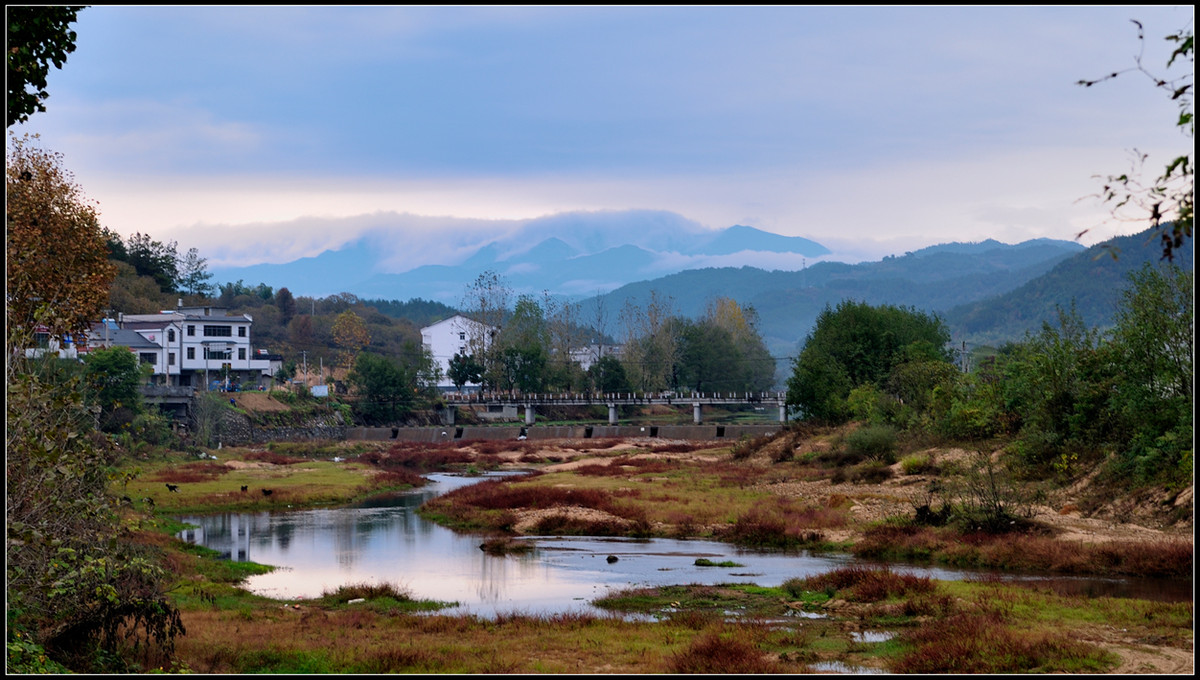
A village in the town of Jiuzihe

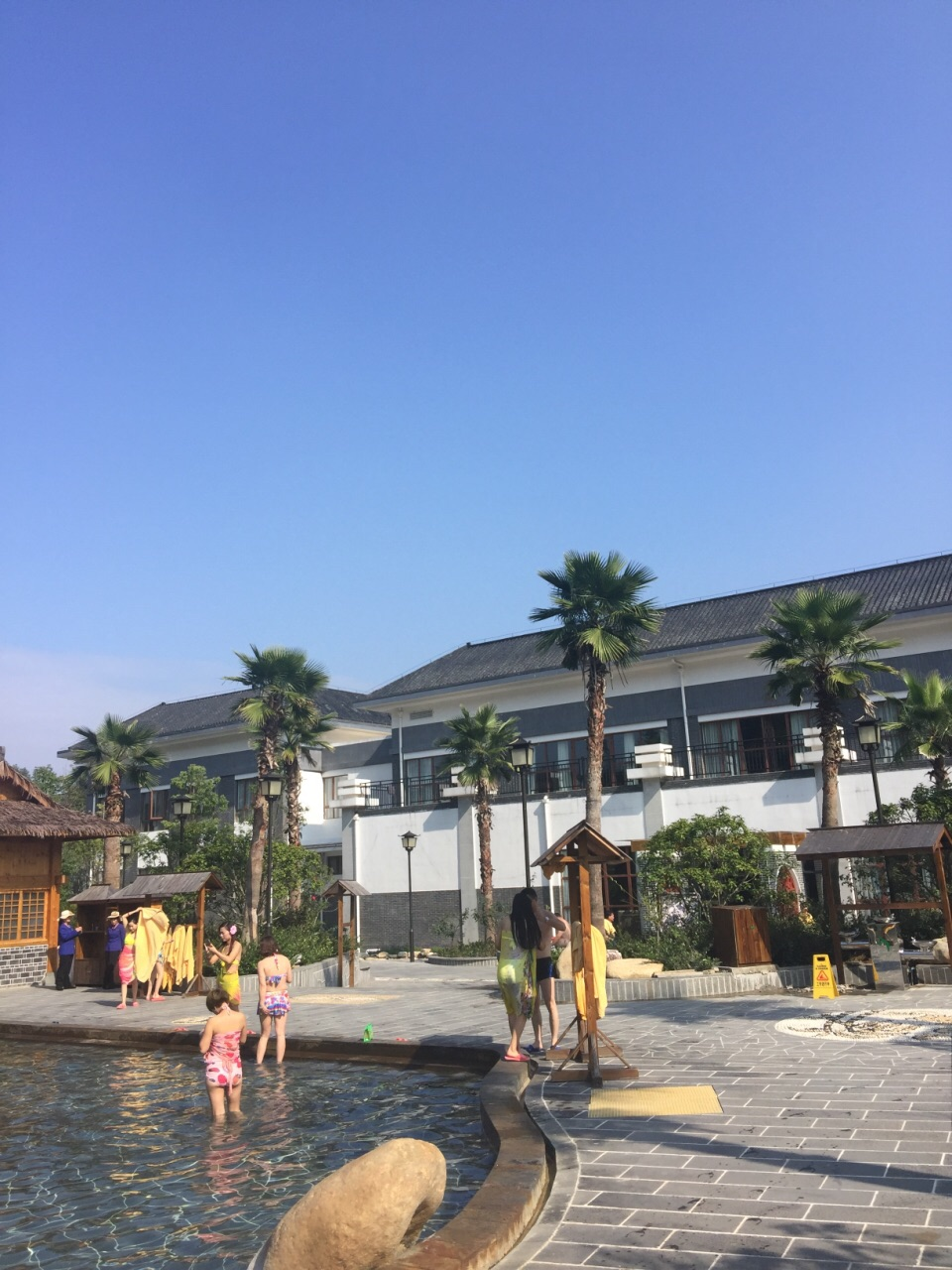
Hot spring in Sanlifan

The main industry of Luotian County is agriculture and it is well known for its production of chestnut and persimmon. According to a national report on chestnut plantation, Luotian produced 65,000 tonnes of chestnuts in the year of 2013 and it was considered as the biggest producer of chestnuts in China. The annual production of chestnut in Luotian is worth about 500 million RMB.

Other industries of Luotian include pharmaceuticals, food processing, electrical machinery, auto parts manufacturing, production of fertilizers and tourism. It is necessary to indicate that tourist industry in Luotian has been developing very fast in recent years and the most popular tourist sites include: Tiantangzhai National Forest Park, Bodaofeng National Forest Park, Sanlifan Hot Spring and Jinshi River Rafting, etc.

The mount of Tiantangzhai (1729m) is located in the town of Jiuzihe, and as one of the highest peaks in the Dabie Mountains, affords a good view. The temperature in Tiantangzhai during summer stays around 25 degree Celsius, 10 degree lower than in Huanggang or Wuhan. The forest and weather in Tiantangzhai attracts thousands of tourists annually for outdoor activities.

In addition to Tiantangzhai, the hot spring in the town of Sanlifan has become a major attraction. Sanlifan has produced geothermal energy and mineral water of high quality for more than 150 years and the temperature of the hot spring may reach 90 degree Celsius. The spring of Sanlifan contains a variety of trace elements beneficial to the human body, such as zinc, strontium, metasilicic acid and so on.

== Transportation ==
- Although in a mountainous area, transportation of Luotian is good, with numerous roads and highways.
- China National Highway 318
- The Wuhan-Yingshan highway links Luotian to Wuhan, the provincial capital in about 2 hours and Wuhan airport is 110 kilometers to the west.
- Huangzhou port on the Yangtze river is about 70 km (43 mi) away to the southwest.
- For the north–south transportation, Macheng-Wuxue highway.

== Notable inhabitants ==
- Xu Shouhui (徐壽輝) (1320–1360) who was a rebel leader in the late Yuan dynasty (1279–1368) who proclaimed himself emperor.
- Wan Mizhai (1499–1582), was a famous doctor in the Ming dynasty.
- Yu Sansheng (1802–1866), one of the founders of the Peking opera.
