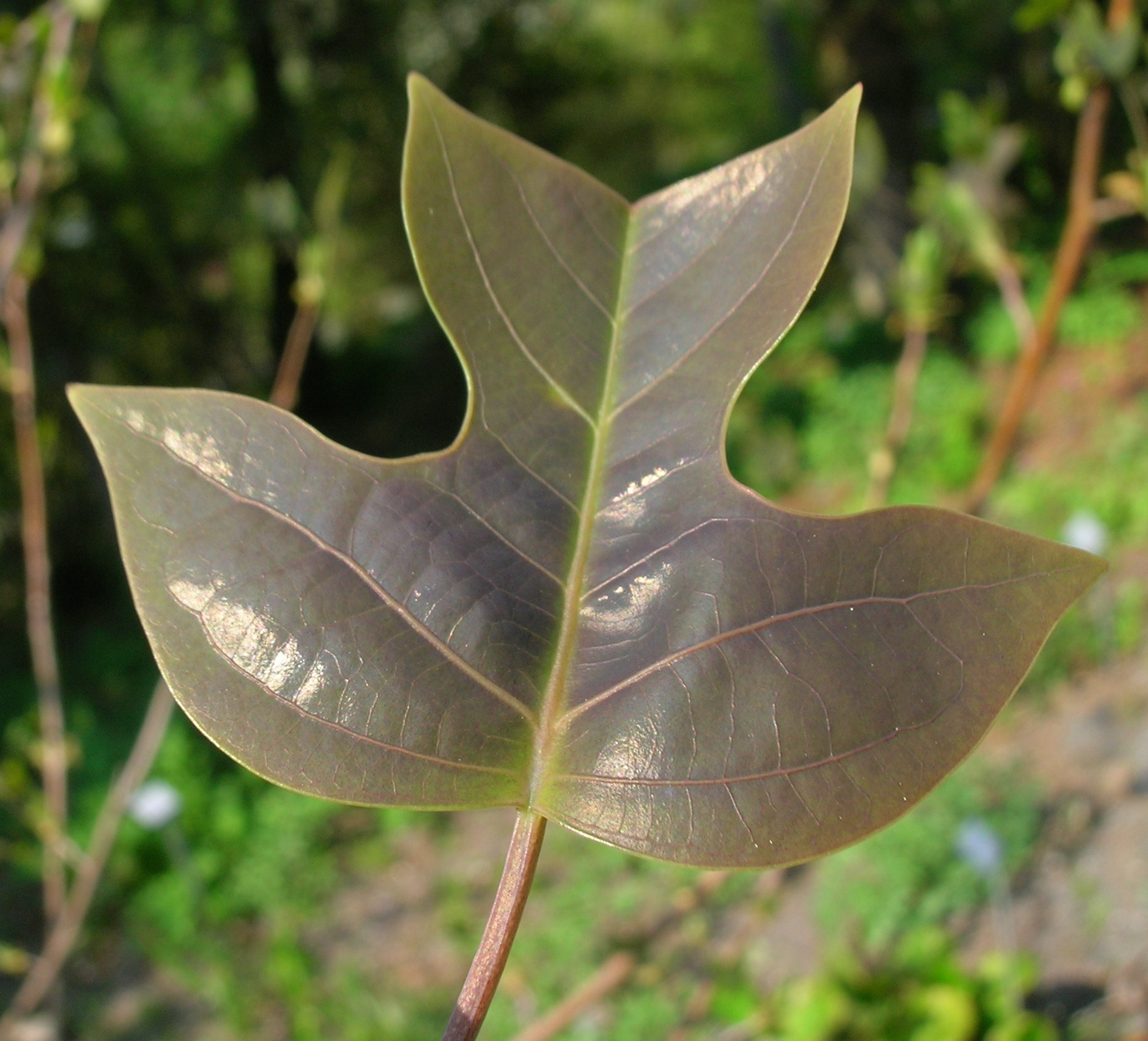

Conservation status
- Near Threatened (IUCN 3.1)

Scientific classification
- Kingdom: Plantae
- Clade: Tracheophytes
- Clade: Angiosperms
- Clade: Magnoliids
- Order: Magnoliales
- Family: Magnoliaceae
- Genus: Liriodendron
- Species: L. chinense

Binomial name
- Liriodendron chinense (Hemsl.) Sarg.

Synonyms
- Liriodendron tulipifera var. chinense Hemsl.; Liriodendron tulipifera var. sinense Diels

= Liriodendron chinense =

Species of tree

Liriodendron chinense (commonly known as the Chinese tulip poplar, Chinese tulip tree or Chinese whitewood) is Asia's native species in the genus Liriodendron. This native of central and southern China grows in the provinces of Anhui, Guangxi, Jiangsu, Fujian, Guizhou, Hubei, Hunan, Jiangxi, Shaanxi, Zhejiang, Sichuan and Yunnan, and also locally in northern Vietnam. Protected populations occur in the Tianmushan National Reserve , Huangshan , Wuyi Shan , and Badagongshan Nature Reserve .

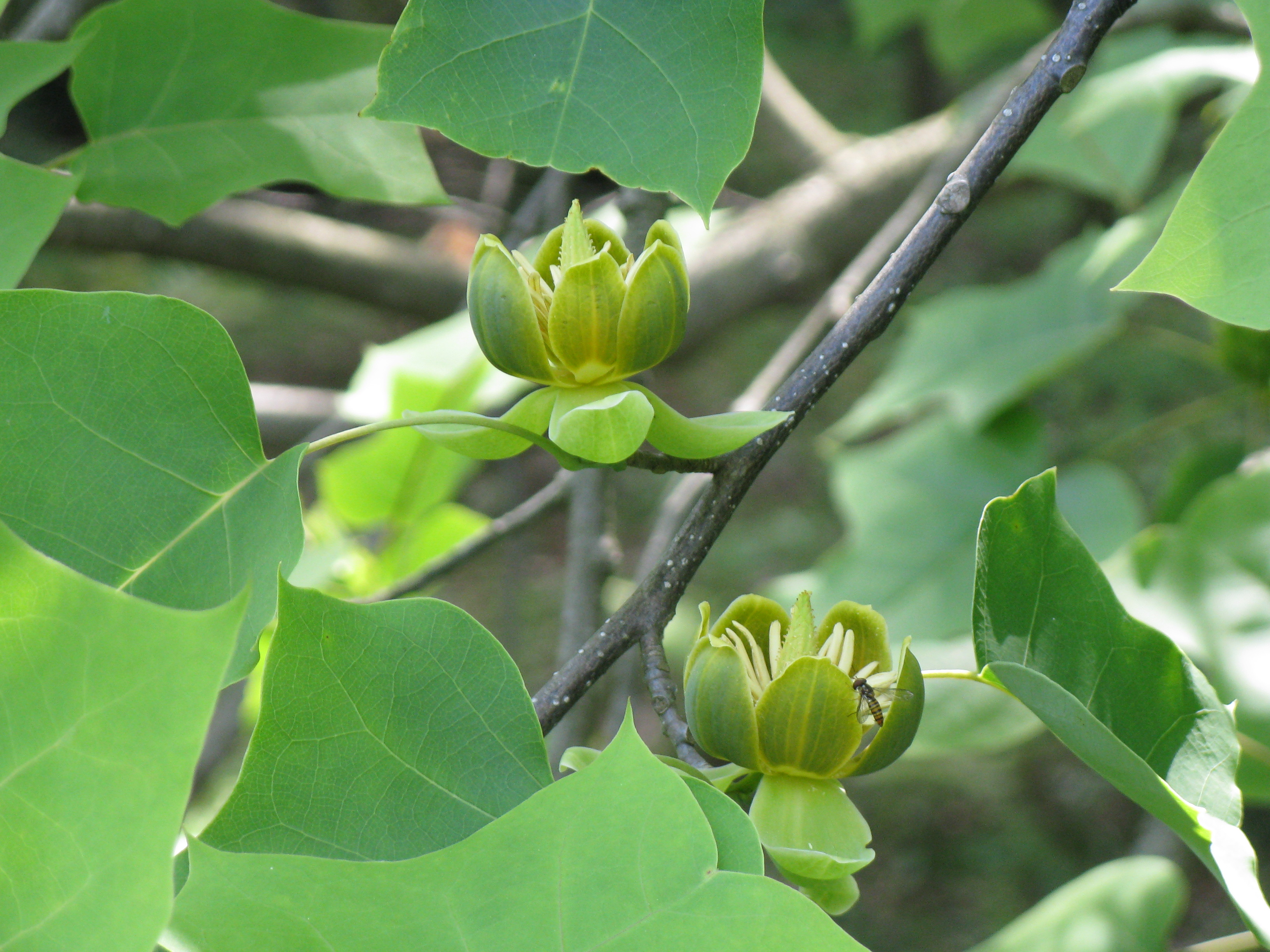
Liriodendron chinense twig with flowers

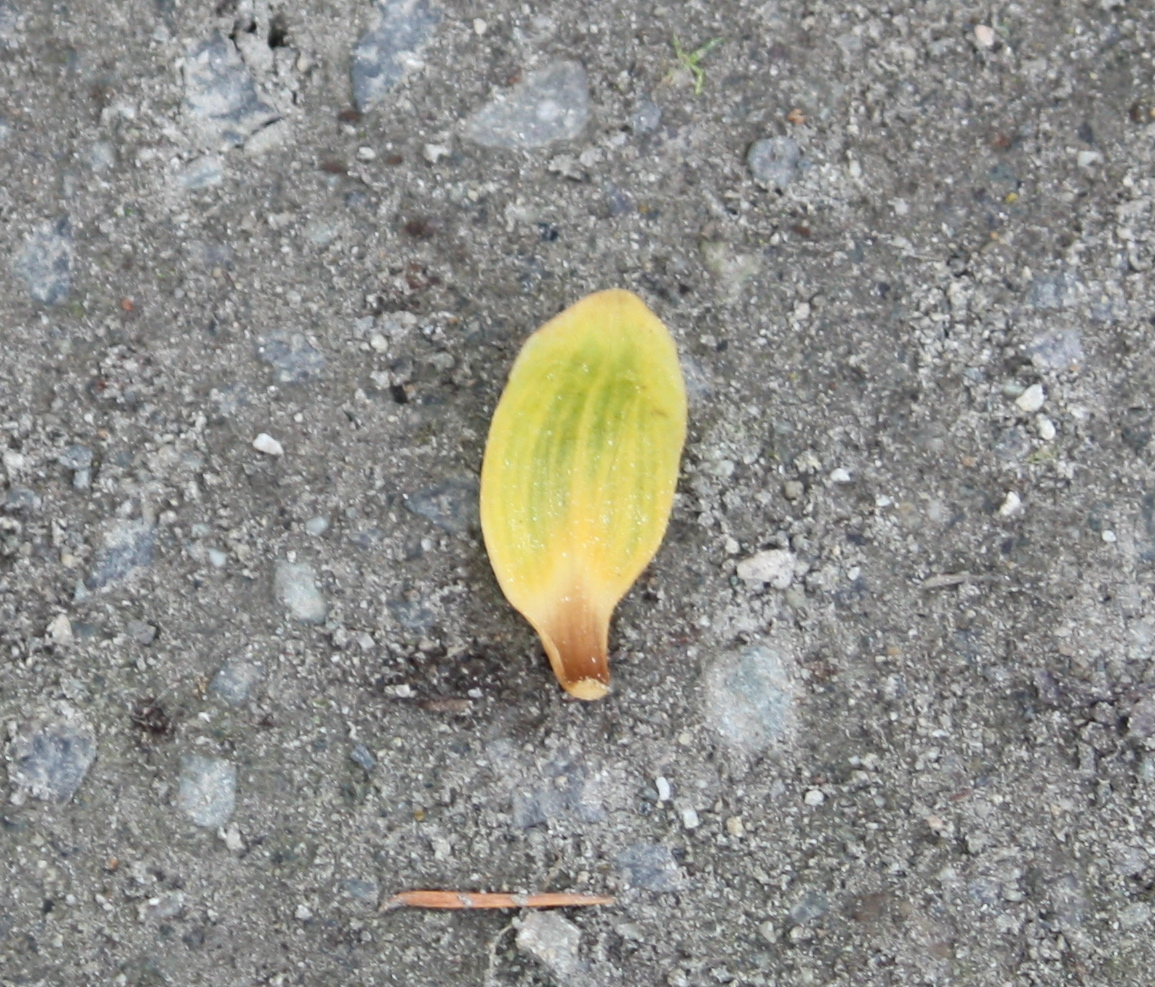
Petal from Liriodendron chinense flower at Finnerty Gardens, University of Victoria

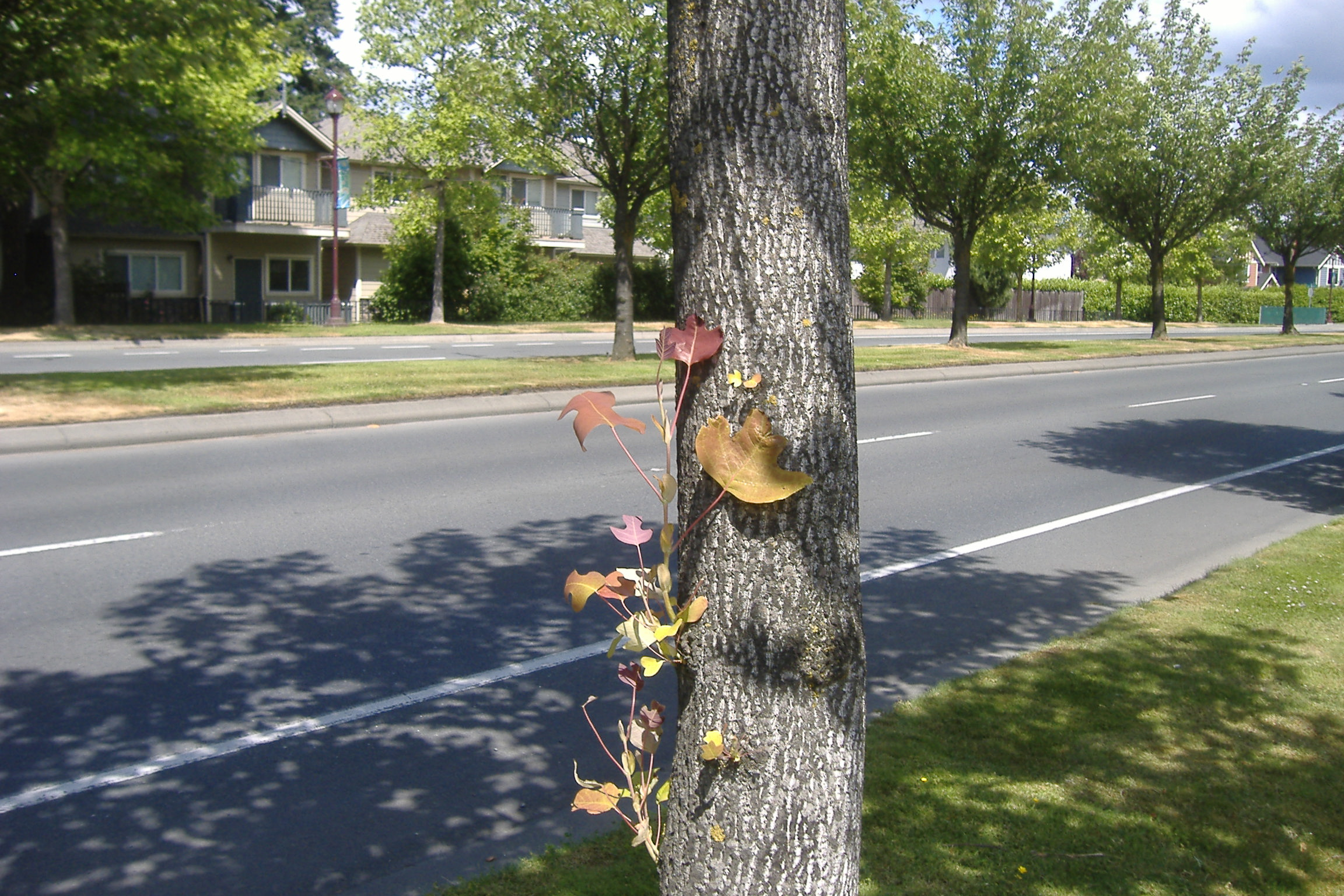
Trunk of L. chinense with epicormic shoots at Langford, British Columbia, showing a purplish tint often seen in juvenile foliage of this species.

== Description ==
Liriodendron chinense is very similar to the American species, Liriodendron tulipifera, differing in the often slightly larger and more deeply lobed leaves, and in the shorter inner petals in the flowers, which lack the orange pigment of L. tulipifera. The Chinese tulip tree reaches about 40 metres (130 ft) tall. Most of its populations are deciduous, with a semi-evergreen population identified at Mengla, Yunnan.

== Cultivation ==
It is not as hardy as the American species, but is cultivated on other continents as an ornamental tree. It is grown in England (where there are many at Kew Gardens), Ireland, Belgium, the Netherlands, and Germany. In North America, it grows as far north as Boston, Massachusetts, in the east, and Vancouver, British Columbia, in the west. It is a street tree at the University of Victoria and along the Veterans' Memorial Parkway in Langford, British Columbia. A plantation of it is at the National Arboretum in Canberra. In cultivation it grows as fast as the American tulip tree. A cultivar (J.C.Raulston) with leaves larger and darker than typical has been developed in North Carolina.

In the United Kingdom L. chinense has gained the Royal Horticultural Society's Award of Garden Merit.
