= 1687 in China =

- Decades: 1660s; 1670s; 1680s; 1690s; 1700s
- See also: Other events of 1687; History of China • Timeline • Years

Events from the year 1687 in China.

== Incumbents ==
- Kangxi Emperor (26th year)

== Events ==
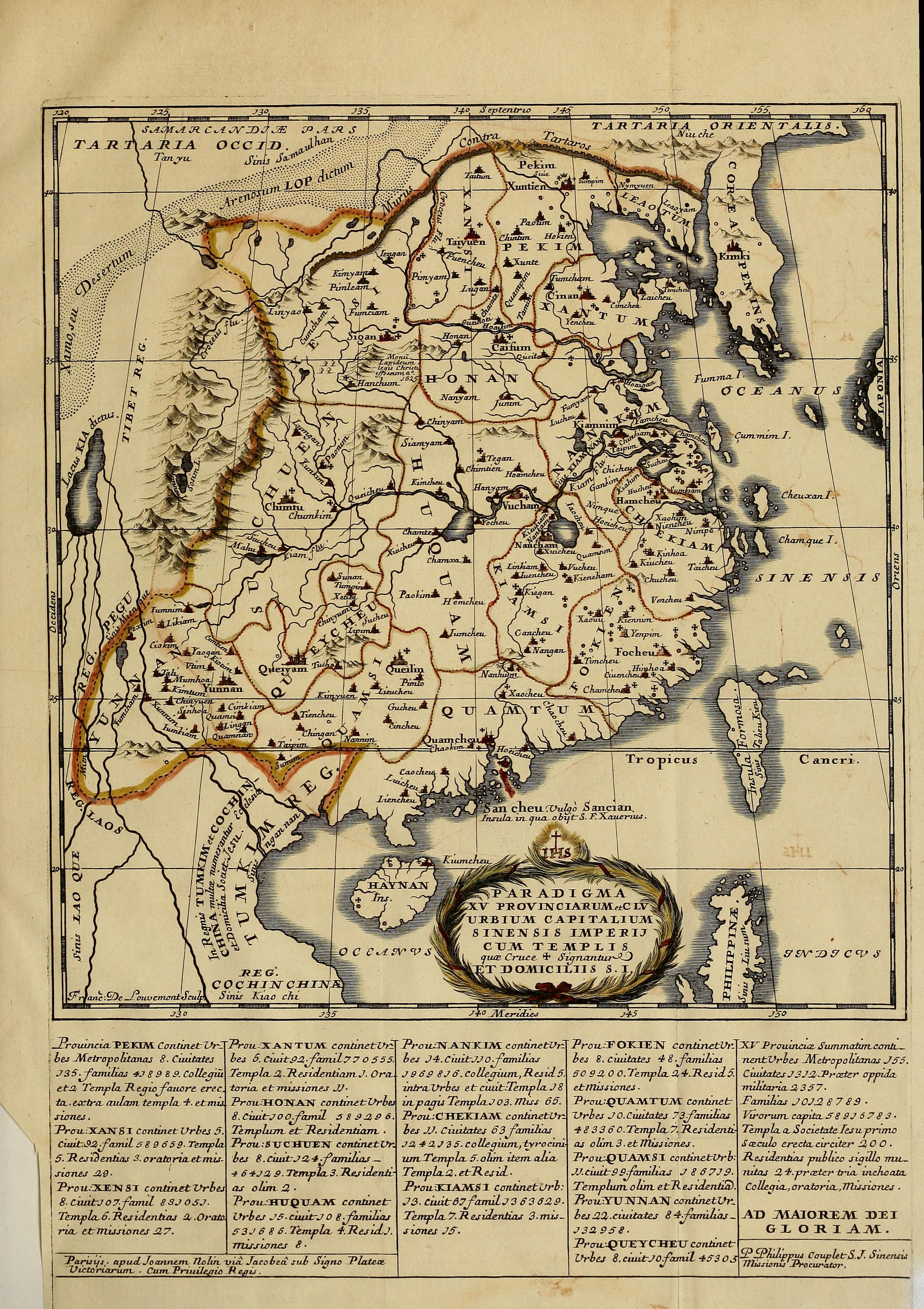
A map of the 200-odd Jesuit churches and missions established across China c. 1687.

- Five French Jesuits arrive in Beijing and later help the emperor in the Bureau of Astronomy and in the field of medicine
- The imperial court promulgates a plan requiring garrison officers to ascertain that candidates (whether Manchu, Mongol, or Chinese) were in some degree proficient in horsemanship and archery before being admitted to the entry-level imperial examinations
- Sino-Russian border conflicts

== Births ==
- Li Wei (1687?–1738) a native of Xuzhou, Jiangsu and instrumental in carrying out Yongzheng's nationwide reforms in his role in various regional governing positions.

== Deaths ==
- Frederick Coyett (揆一); born in Stockholm c. 1615, buried in Amsterdam on 17 October 1687, was a Swedish nobleman and the last colonial governor for the Dutch colony of Formosa
- Geng Juzhong (耿聚忠; 1650–1687) was the third son of Geng Jimao, brother of Revolt of the Three Feudatories participant Geng Jingzhong and court member of the Qing dynasty. He was a Third Class Viscount (三等子)
