= Geng (surname) =

Geng (耿)
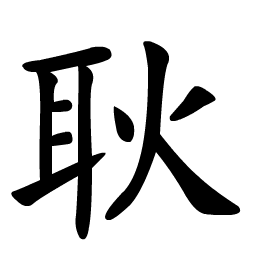
- Pronunciation: Gěng (Mandarin)
- Language: Chinese

Origin
- Language: Old Chinese

Other names
- Variant form: Keng

Geng is the Mandarin pinyin romanization of the Chinese surname written 耿 in Chinese character. It is romanized as Keng in Wade–Giles. Geng is listed 350th in the Song dynasty classic text Hundred Family Surnames. As of 2008, it is the 139th most common surname in China, shared by 990,000 people.

== Notable people ==
- Geng Chun (耿纯; died 37 AD), Eastern Han dynasty general, one of the Yuntai 28 generals
- Geng Yan (3–58), another of the Yuntai 28 generals
- Geng Guo (耿國; died 58), Eastern Han general, brother of Geng Yan
- Geng Bing (耿秉; died 91), Eastern Han general, son of Geng Guo
- Geng Shu (耿舒; 1st century), Eastern Han general
- Geng Gong (耿恭), Eastern Han general, nephew of Geng Yan
- Jian Yong (3rd century), original surname Geng, advisor of Liu Bei
- Geng Quanbin (耿全斌; 10th century), Northern Song dynasty general
- Geng Shuyi (耿淑仪; 983–1064), consort of Emperor Shengzong of Liao
- Geng Jing (耿京; died 1162), Jin dynasty rebel leader
- Geng Zaicheng (耿再成; died 1362), rebel leader under Zhu Yuanzhang, Duke of Si
- Geng Bingwen (1334–1403), Ming dynasty general, Marquis of Changxing
- Geng Xuan (耿璿), son of Geng Bingwen, executed by the Yongle Emperor
- Geng Jiuchou (耿九畴; died 1460), Ming dynasty Minister of Justice
- Geng Yu (耿裕; 1430–1496), Ming dynasty Minister of Rites, son of Geng Jiuchou
- Geng Dingxiang (耿定向; 1524–1597), Ming dynasty Minister of Revenue
- Geng Dingli (耿定力; 1541–?), Vice Minister of War, brother of Geng Dingxiang
- Geng Zhongming (1604–1649), King/Prince of Jingnan of the Qing dynasty
- Geng Jimao (died 1671), King/Prince of Jingnan, son of Geng Zhongming
- Geng Jingzhong (died 1682), King/Prince of Jingnan, son of Geng Jimao, executed after rebelling against the Qing
- Geng Juzhong (Chinese: 耿聚忠; 1650 – 1687) was the third son of Geng Jimao, brother of Revolt of the Three Feudatories participant Geng Jingzhong and court member of the Qing dynasty. He was a Third Class Viscount (三等子)
- Geng Bozhao (耿伯钊; 1883–1957), Republic of China revolutionary and politician
- Keng Yi-Li (1897–1975), Chinese botanist
- Geng Jizhi (耿济之; 1899–1947), Republic of China diplomat and translator
- Geng Biao (1909–2000), PRC Defense Minister and Vice Premier
- Geng Quanli (耿全礼; born 1937), People's Liberation Army major general
- Geng Lianfeng (耿莲凤; born 1944), singer
- Geng Huichang (born 1951), Minister of State Security
- Geng Yanbo (born 1958), former mayor of Datong and Taiyuan
- Geng Lijuan (born 1963), Chinese-Canadian female table tennis player, four-time world champion
- Geng Le (耿乐; born 1974), actor
- Keng Po-hsuan (born 1984), Taiwanese baseball player
- Geng Xiaoling (耿曉靈; born 1984), Hong Kong female wushu athlete
- Geng Xiaofeng (born 1987), football player
- Geng Wenqiang (born 1995), skeleton racer
- Geng Shuai (born 1987 Chinese: 耿帥), dubbed the China's Useless Edison, Chinese village craftsman whose fame has grown online because of his odd and often unnecessary inventions
- Geng Xuanyi (born 2017) World-class Rubik's cube speedsolver
