= 1689 in China =

- Decades: 1660s; 1670s; 1680s; 1690s; 1700s
- See also: Other events of 1689; History of China • Timeline • Years

Events from the year 1689 in China.

== Incumbents ==
- Kangxi Emperor (28th year)

== Events ==
- Sino-Russian border conflicts
  - Resolved with the signing of the Treaty of Nerchinsk, the first treaty between Russia (Tsardom of Russia) and China (Great Qing Empire). The Russians gave up the area north of the Amur River as far as the Stanovoy Range and kept the area between the Argun River and Lake Baikal.

== Births ==
- Jiao Bingzhen (Chinese: 焦秉貞, 1689–1726) was a native of Jining, Shandong who became a noted painter and astronomer. He is noteworthy as one of the first Qing dynasty painters to be influenced by the West

== Deaths ==
- Zhang Dai (張岱; pinyin: Zhāng Dài, courtesy name: Zhongzhi (宗子), pseudonym: Tao'an (陶庵)) (1597–1684) a Ming Dynasty Chinese writer, historian, essayist, a biographer of his own privileged aristocratic family. His bibliographical collection Dream Memories of Tao'an, a is considered a masterpiece of late Ming dynasty xiaopin and a key reference of the tangible culture assets of his time.
- Yolo (岳樂; 1625–1689), Abatai's fourth son, held the title Prince An of the Second Rank from 1651 to 1654
