= Dafo Temple (Guangzhou) =

Buddhist temple in Guangzhou, China

- 大佛寺
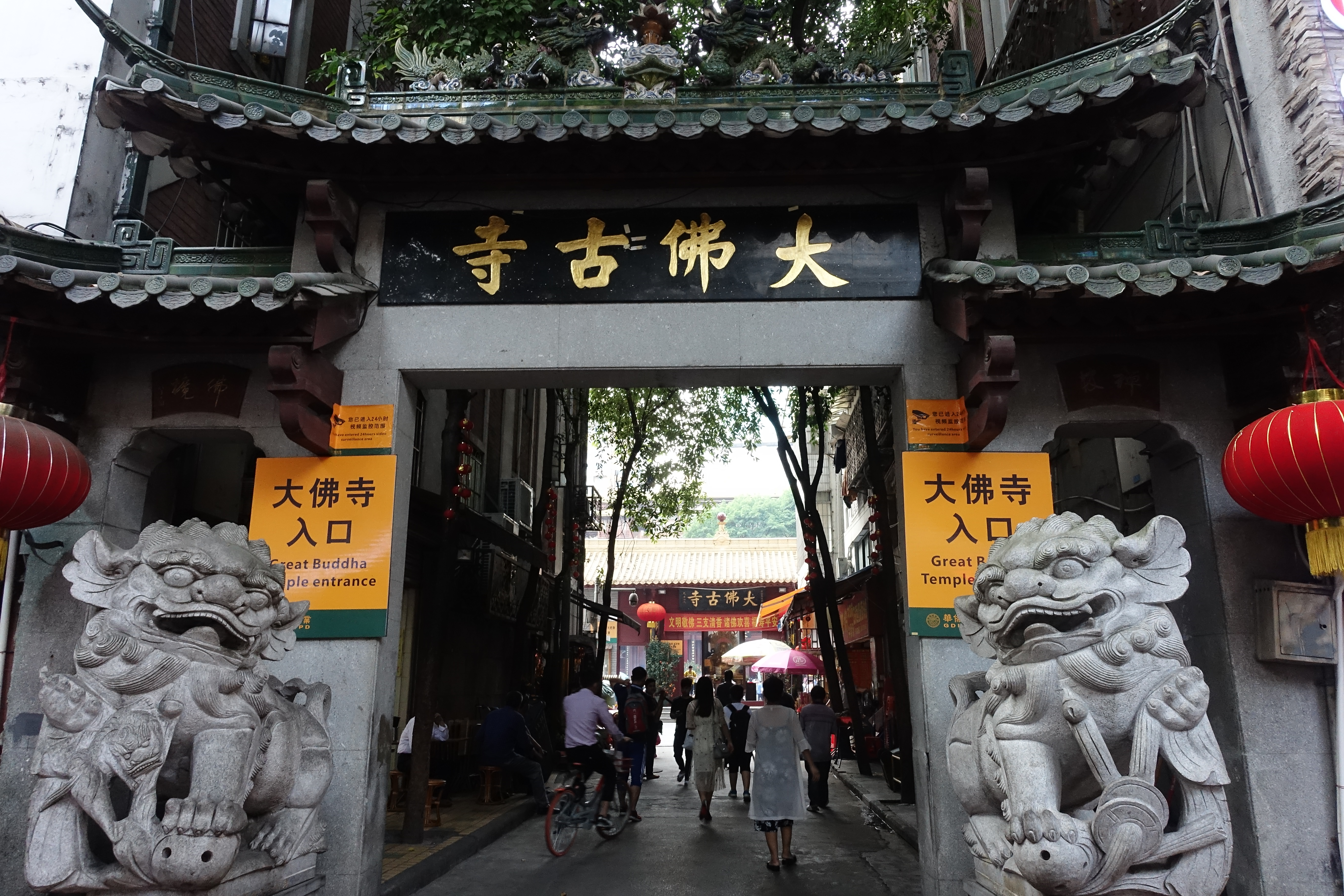
- The shanmen at Dafo Temple

- Location within Guangdong Location within China

Religion
- Affiliation: Buddhism
- Sect: Chan
- District: Yuexiu District
- Prefecture: Guangzhou
- Province: Guangdong

Location
- Country: China
- Prefecture: Guangzhou
- Coordinates: 23°07′44″N 113°16′27″E

Architecture
- Founder: Liu Yan
- Established: Southern Han dynasty (907–971)

Website
- www.dafosi.org

The Dafo Temple (Chinese: 大佛寺; pinyin: Dàfó Sì; literally Grand Buddha Temple) is a Buddhist temple in Guangzhou, Guangdong, China. Located in Yuexiu District, Dafo Temple is a grand temple with a history of more than one thousand years and was built by Emperor Liu Yan in the Southern Han dynasty (917–971). It has been praised as one of the "Five Largest Temples of Guangzhou" in history. Later it was destroyed and rebuilt many times. In the late Ming dynasty, the temple was declining day by day and was devastated by the war while Shang Kexi and Geng Jimao conquered Guangdong in 1649. During the reign of the Kangxi Emperor in 1663, the temple was rebuilt and expanded by Shang Kexi continuously. According to the national policy of free religious belief, the temple was approved by the Guangzhou Municipal People's Government to be restored as a Buddhist temple in 1981. Then Master Guangming, vice-president of the Guangzhou Buddhist Association, served as abbot; he tried to revitalize Dafo Temple and restore the style of the large temple. On August 9, 1993, Dafo Temple was put on the list as a Municipality Protected Historic Site by the Guangzhou Municipal People's Government.

== History ==
=== Imperial China ===
With a history of over 1,200 years, Dafo Temple was first erected in the Southern Han dynasty (917–971) with the name of Xinzang Temple (新藏寺) by the emperor Liu Yan, who was a devout Buddhist believer and built 28 Buddhist temples in his empire, which represented the lunar mansions.

In the Song dynasty (917–1271), half-ruined, hardly a building untouched, Dafo Temple became a desolate place.

In the Yuan dynasty (1271–1368), the temple was rebuilt at the site with the name of Futian'an (福田庵).

In the Ming dynasty (1368–1911), Futian'an was renamed Longzang Temple (龙藏寺) and extended continuously. In the late Ming dynasty, the Jiajing Emperor preferred Taoism and advocated Taoism in his lifetime, with a policy of suppressing Buddhism. Dafo Temple was turned into a government building of Xun'an Yushi (巡按御史).

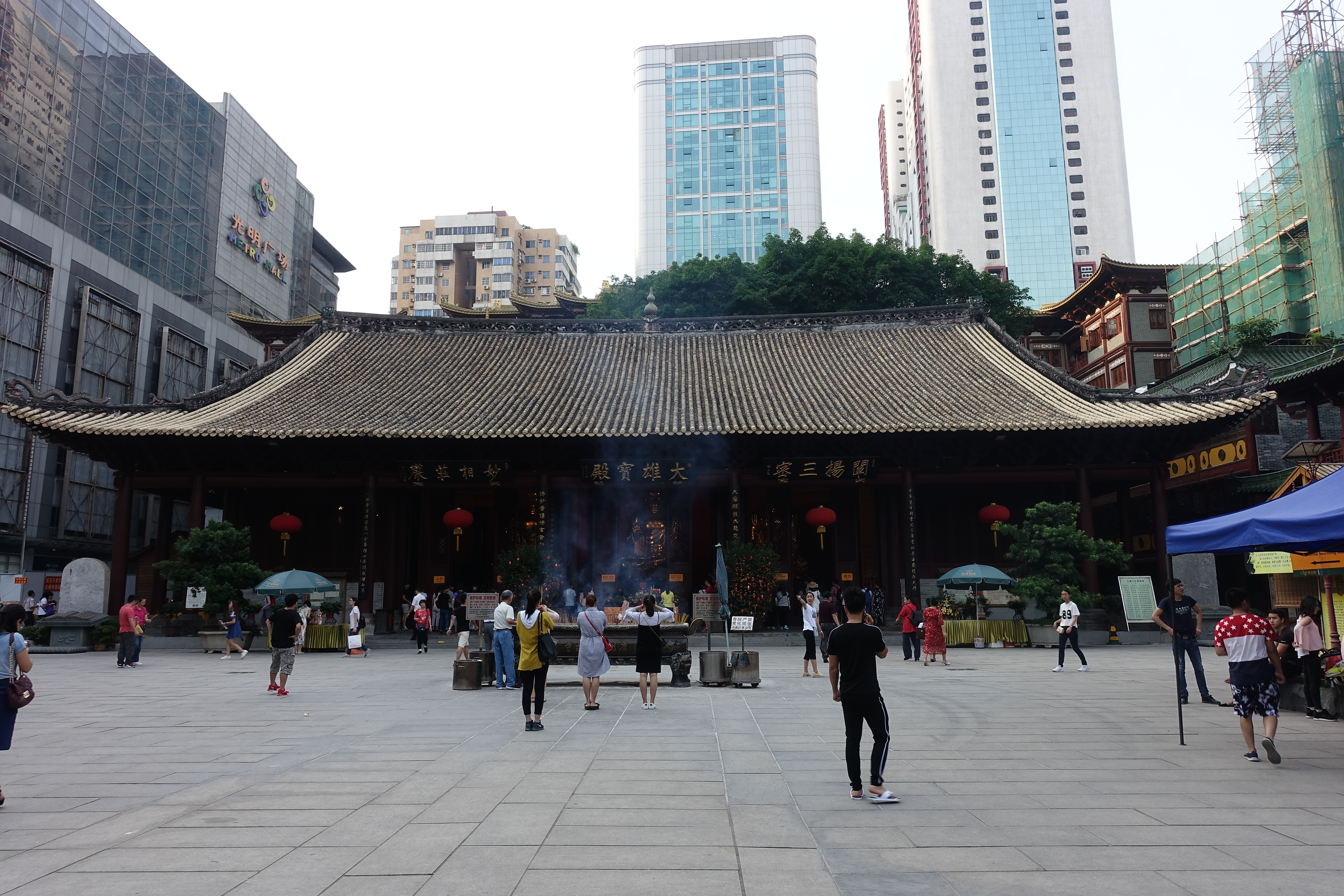
The Mahavira Hall at Dafo Temple

In 1649 during the Qing dynasty (1644–1911), the court ordered Shang Kexi and Geng Jimao to conquer Baiyue (now Guangdong province); Dafo Temple was demolished in the war and became a pile of rubble. In 1661, the King of Vietnam visited the Qing Empire via Guangzhou; a monk from Longzang Temple asked the King to donate wood and the King agreed. In 1663, Shang Kexi donated property to establish the temple and completed it in the following year. The temple had reached an unprecedented heyday in that time. There were three copper statues of Buddha situated in the Mahavira Hall; the statues were 6 metres (20 ft) high and weighed 10 tonnes (9.8 long tons; 11 short tons), and were the largest statues in the Lingnan Region. So the temple was renamed Dafo Temple (大佛寺). In the middle of the Kangxi period, Master Zile (自乐禅师) came to the deserted Dafo Temple and invited Master Zhengmu (正目禅师), abbot of Haichuang Temple to serve as its abbot. In 1733, the Yongzheng Emperor issued a decree to rectify Buddhism. The Zhifu (magistrate) of Guangzhou, Liu Shu (刘庶), chose Dafo Temple as the place of announcing the imperial decree. He erected Baoyu Pavilion (宝御亭), Hall of Skanda, Hall of Sangharama and the Monk's House in the temple. Dafo Temple had been praised as one of the "Five Largest Temples of Guangzhou", alongside Guangxiao Temple, Hualin Temple, Haichuang Temple and Changshou Temple. In 1839, Lin Zexu, the imperial commissioner, set up the headquarters of the collection of opium smoking (收缴烟土烟枪总局) in Dafo Temple. During the Taiping Rebellion (1851-1861), the government of Guangdong occupied the Monk's House and set up the Pacify Bureau (善后局). Only three monks lived in the temple.

=== Modern China ===
==== Republic of China ====
In the early Republican era, the government of Guangzhou occupied halls of Dafo Temple and set up the Administrative office of Guangzhou.

In 1921, monks of the Five Largest Temples of Guangzhou originated the Yuejing Association (阅经社) of Guangzhou Buddhism in Dafo Temple. The president of the Republic of China, Sun Yat-sen, made a plaque with an inscription of "Chanyang Sanmi" (阐扬三密; means publicizing Buddhism) as largess to Dafo Temple.

In 1922, in the name of raising the pay for the Northern Expedition and municipal construction, the government of Guangzhou intended to sell the Dafo Temple. Master Jingsheng (敬胜法师), abbot of Dafo Temple, led a Provincial Government Petition Movement with more than 30 monks. The Governor Chen Ce agreed to retain part of Dafo Temple.

On March 26, 1926, after the Canton Coup, Dafo Temple was used as a classroom for the Senior political course; Zhou Enlai was the head teacher.

In 1933, Naval Commander Jiang Xiyuan invited Bazhi Toutuo (八指头陀) to Dafo Temple to propagate the Dharma.

In 1934, Xie Yingbo (谢英伯), Liang Zhiguang (梁致广), and Luo Biyu (落笔瑜) donated money to renovate Dafo Temple. Bazhi Toutuo was unanimously chosen as abbot.

In the autumn of 1938, the Imperial Japanese army invaded south China, the abbot Bazhi Toutuo relocated to Hong Kong and the monks gradually dispersed. Then the puppet government of Guangzhou occupied Dafo Temple.

After the Second Sino-Japanese War, Master Wanjing (玩经法师) moved to Dafo Temple.

==== People's Republic of China ====
In 1956, the Bureau of Education of Yuexiu District established the School of Huixin West Street in Dafo Temple.

In 1966, Mao Zedong launched the Cultural Revolution; the Red Guards attacked Dafo Temple. Three copper statues of Grand Buddha were cut into pieces, but they escaped damage during the Cultural Revolution through the personal intervention of Zhou Enlai, who was the then Chinese Premier.

According to the national policy of free religious belief, Dafo Temple was reopened in 1986. Five years later, Master Guangming (广明法师) served as its abbot.

In 1993, the Guangzhou Municipal Government was put on the list as a Municipality Protected Historic Site.

In March 1996, Master Yaozhi (耀智法师) took over as abbot of Dafo Temple.

== Architecture ==
=== Mahavira Hall ===
Mahavira Hall is located in the north and faces the south; covering an area of 1,200-square-metre (13,000 sq ft), it preserves the basic architectural pattern of the Qing dynasty (1644–1911). In 1981, three copper statues of Grand Buddha were enshrined in the Mahavira Hall; each statue is 6 metres (20 ft) high and weighs 10 tonnes (9.8 long tons; 11 short tons).

== Gallery ==
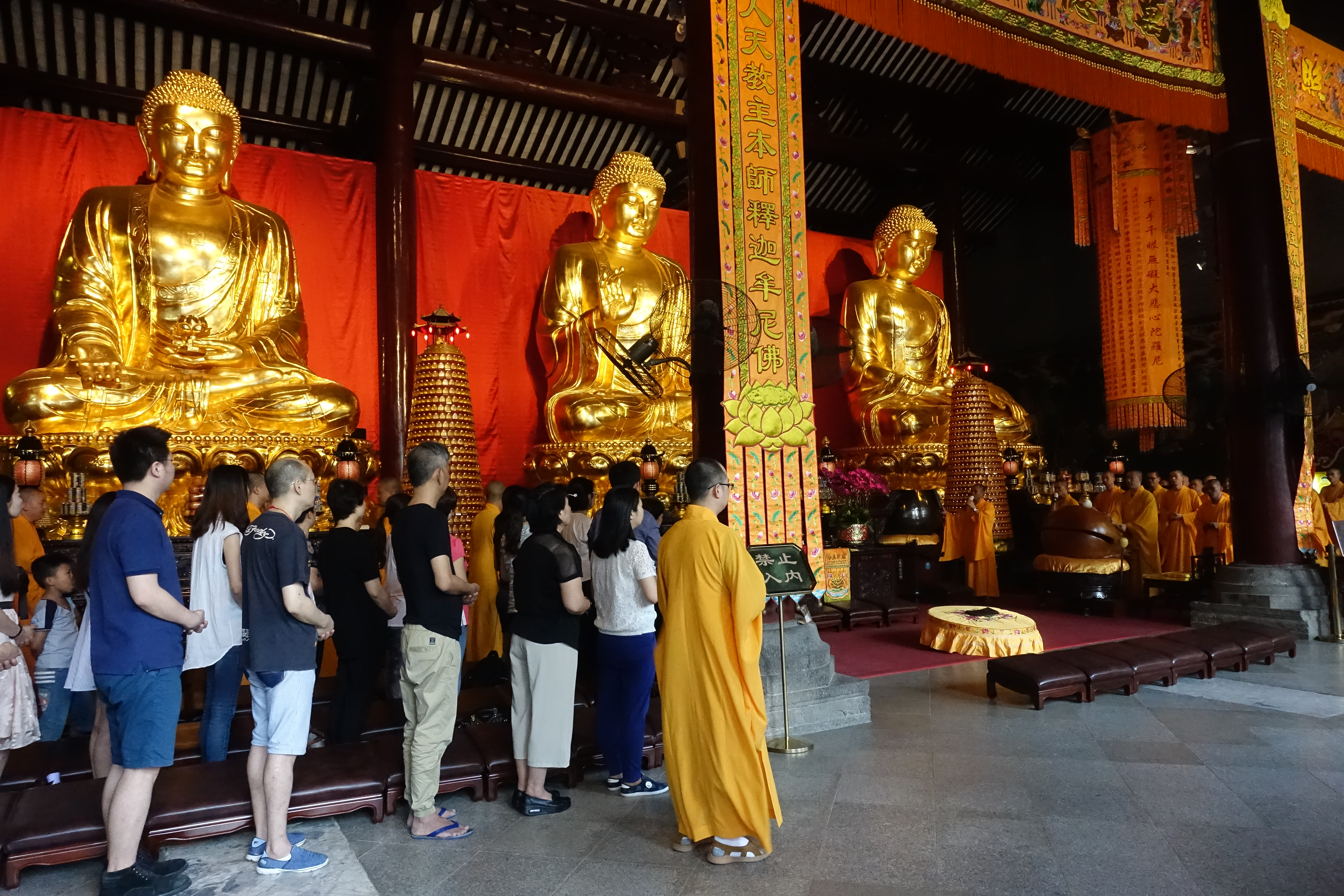
Interior of Mahavira Hall

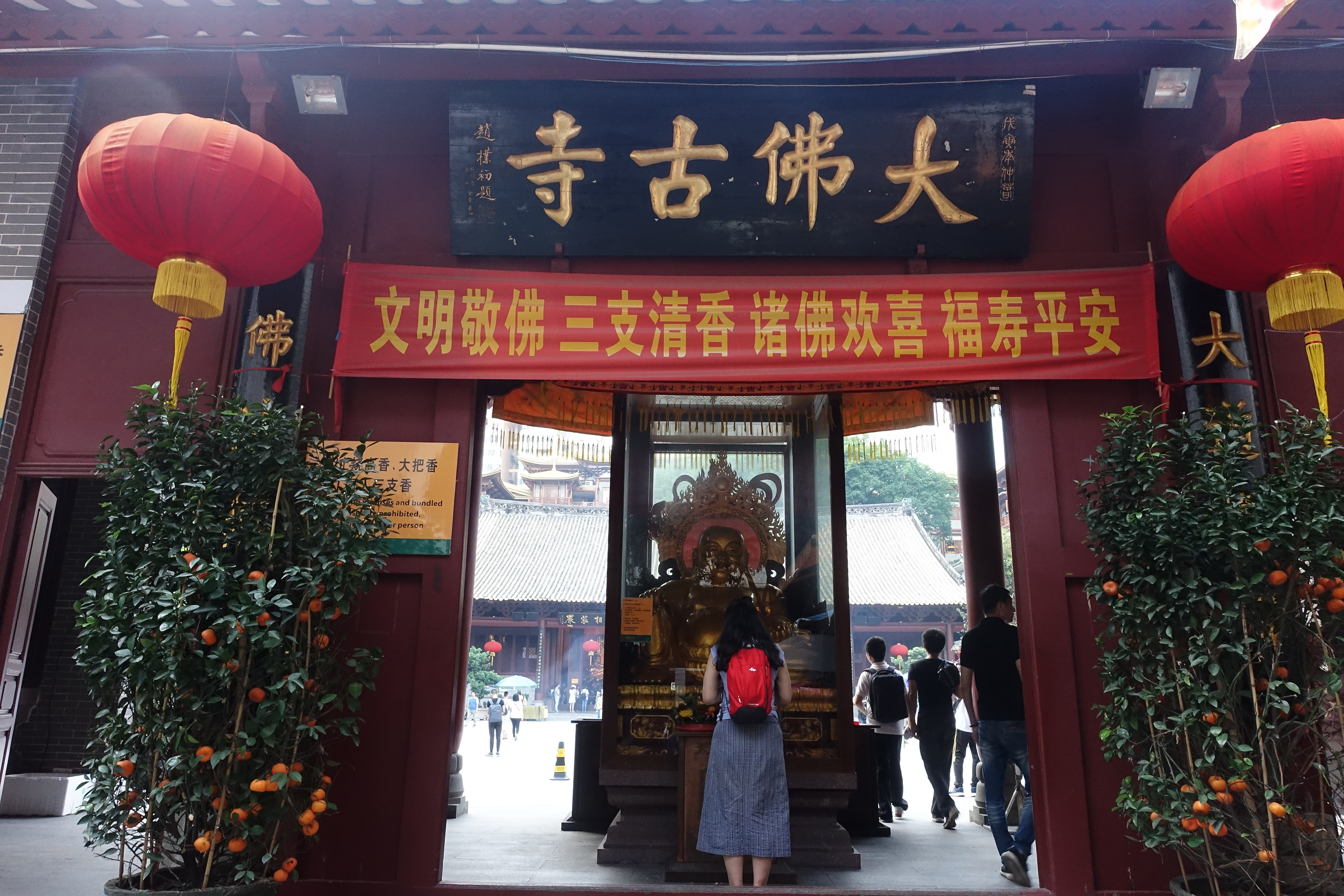
Hall of Four Heavenly Kings

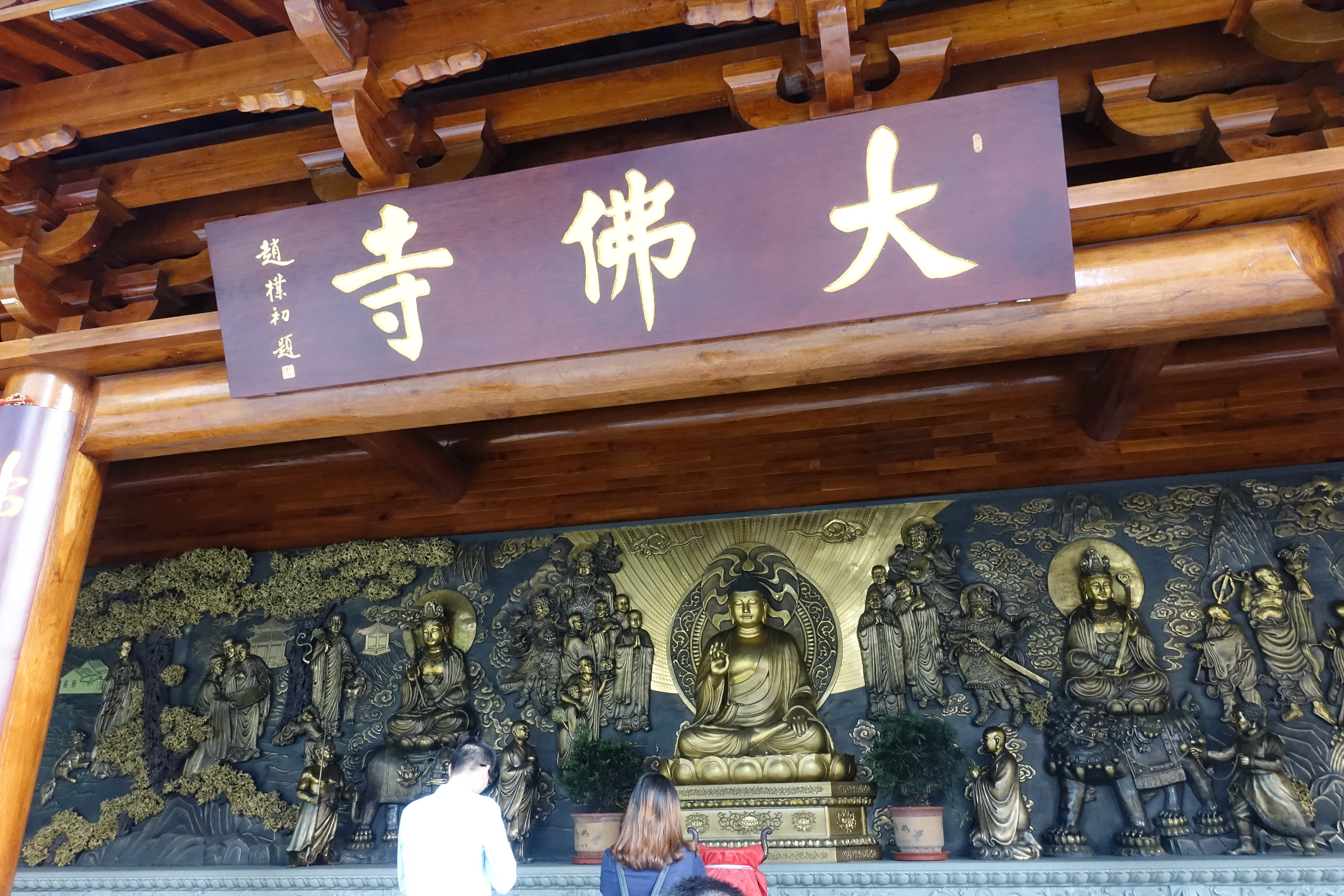
Niches for statues of the Buddha

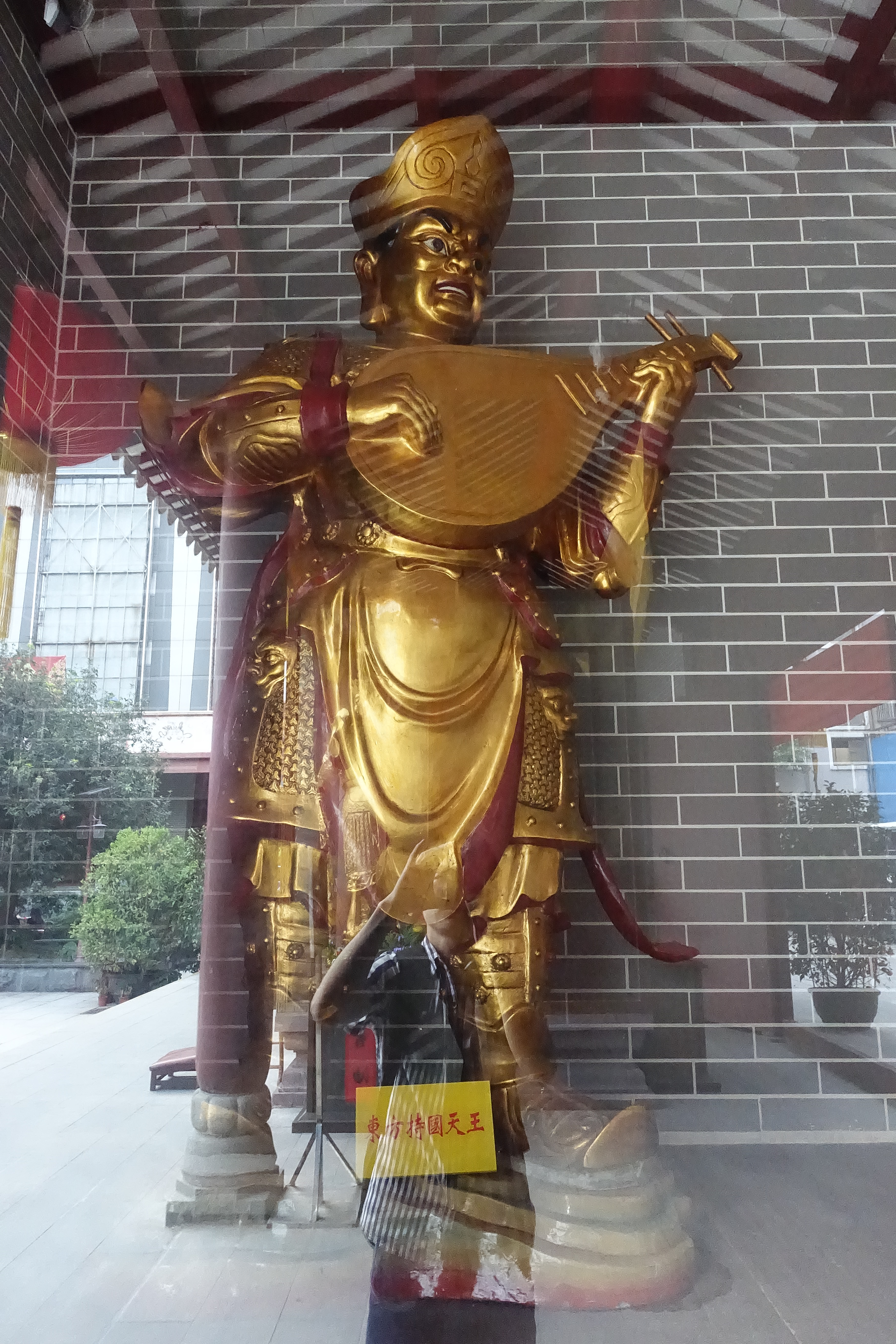
The eastern Dhṛtarāṣṭra at the Hall of Four Heavenly Kings

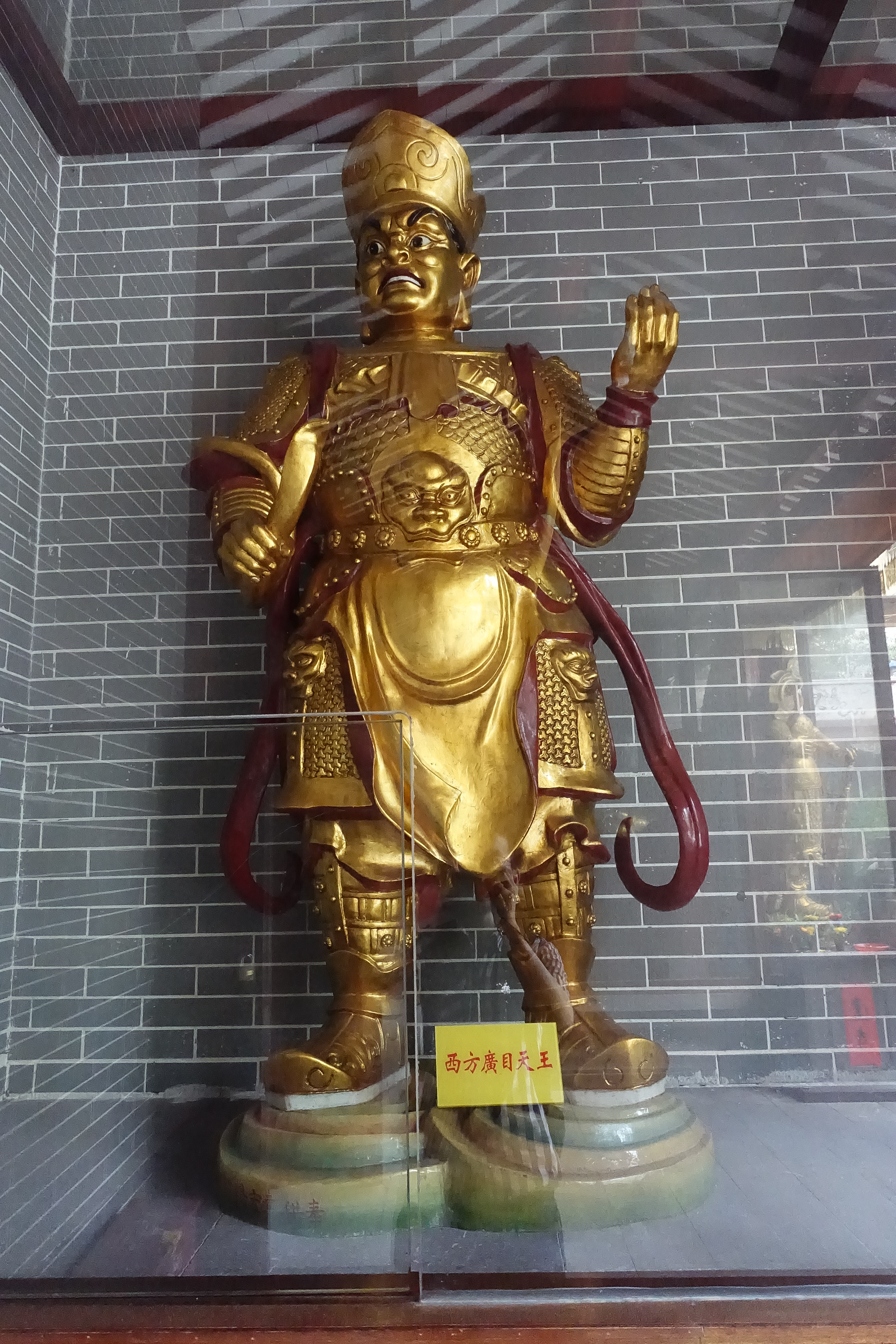
The western Virūpākṣa at the Hall of Four Heavenly Kings

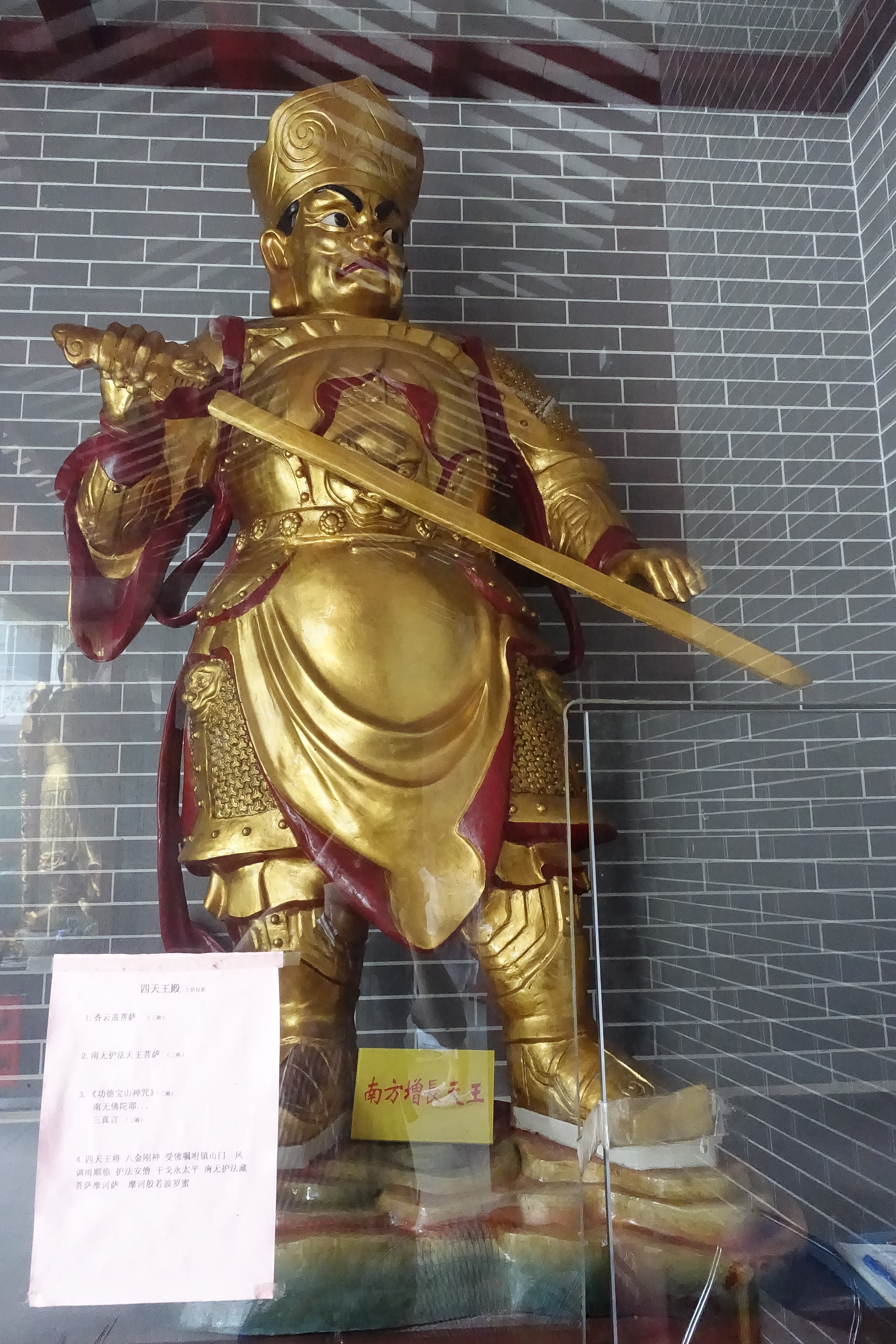
The southern Virūḍhaka at the Hall of Four Heavenly Kings

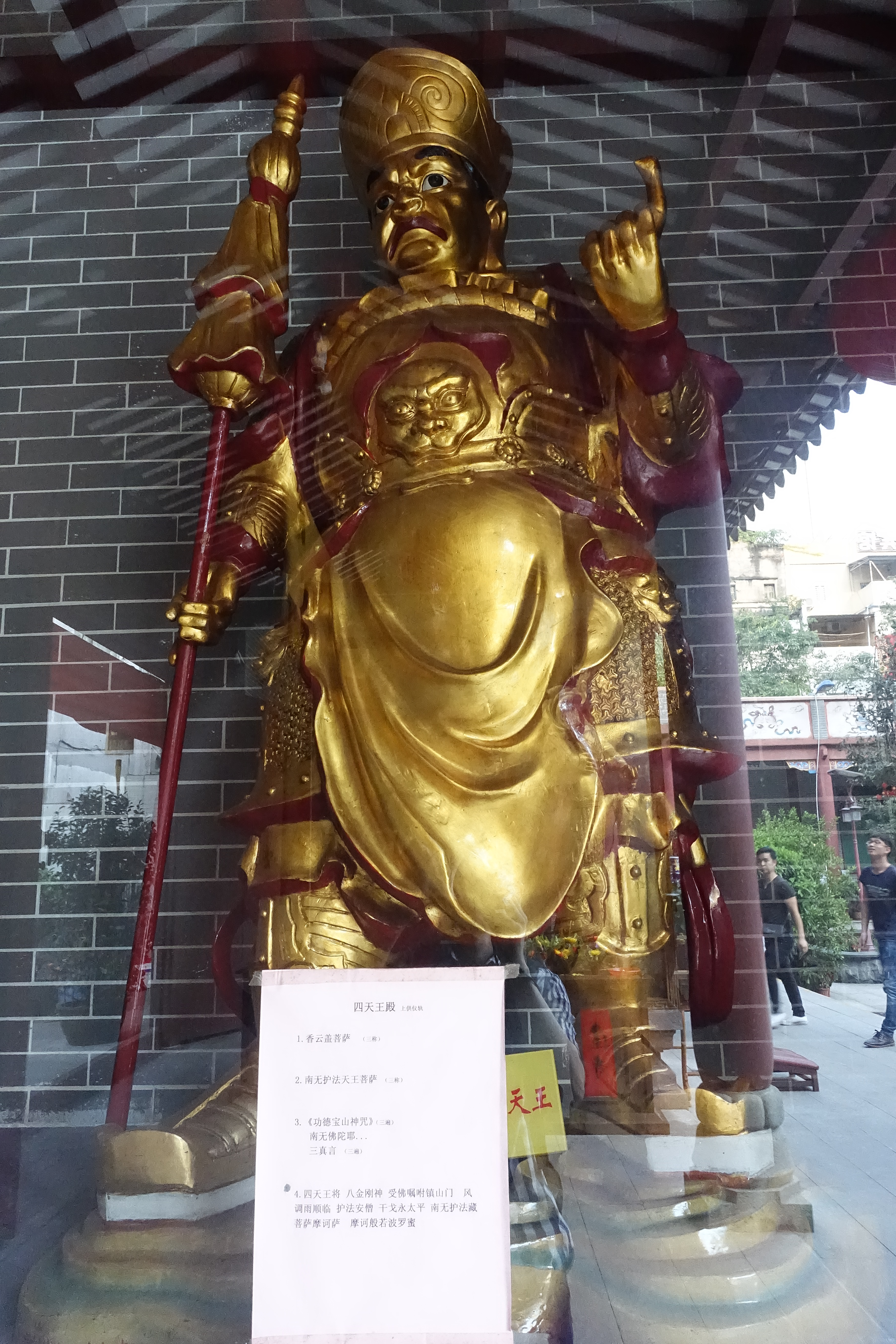
The northern Vaiśravaṇa at the Hall of Four Heavenly Kings
