= Qingfeng =

Qingfeng may refer to:

- Qingfeng County
- Qingfeng (short story), a short story by Pu Songling
