= Qingfeng (short story) =

- Short story by Pu Songling
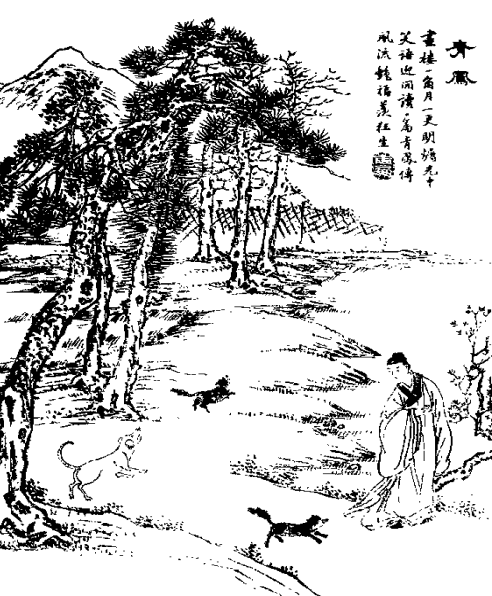
- 19th-century illustration from Xiangzhu liaozhai zhiyi tuyong (Liaozhai Zhiyi with commentary and illustrations; 1886)
- Original title: 青鳳 (Qingfeng)
- Translator: Chen Jitong (c. 1884); Denis C. Mair and Victor H. Mair (1989)
- Language: Chinese
- Genres: Chuanqi; Zhiguai

Publication
- Published in: Strange Stories from a Chinese Studio
- Publication type: Anthology
- Publication date: c. 1740
- Publication place: China

Qingfeng (Chinese: 青鳳; pinyin: Qīngfèng) is a short story by Pu Songling first published in Strange Tales from a Chinese Studio. It revolves around a member of the Geng family and his romance with a fox spirit. The story was translated into French by Chinese diplomat Chen Jitong around 1884, as well as into English by Denis C. Mair and Victor H. Mair in 1989.

== Plot ==
The sprawling residence of the Taiyuan-based Geng family has seemingly become haunted. A daring member of the household, Geng Qubing (耿去病; literally Geng Sickness-Free), volunteers to investigate the strange occurrences, which include laughter and the sound of flutes in the dead of the night. Venturing into one of the estate's buildings that were thought to be uninhabited, he finds another family making merry there. Although he initially accuses Geng of trespassing into their private quarters, the patriarch of the family quickly warms up to him. After calling for his son, Xiao'er (孝儿), who is around two years younger than Geng, the old man shares that his surname is Hu and that his family has descended from the "Tushan line"; Geng confirms that his grandfather compiled a book on Lady Tushan. (Note: Traditionally thought to be a nine-tailed fox spirit who married the legendary king Yu the Great.)

The elder Hu's wife and his niece, Qingfeng (青鳳; literally Blue-Green fenghuang [mythical bird]), soon make their entrance. Geng becomes increasingly intoxicated and makes advances to Qingfeng. This prompts the family to excuse themselves and Geng is forced to head home, although he remains infatuated with Qingfeng. Geng's wife rejects his proposal to change their living quarters. Nevertheless, Geng returns to the same place the next night, but the Hu family is nowhere to be seen. He preoccupies himself by reading in one of the rooms and is suddenly accosted by a black-faced ghost. Far from being frightened, however, Geng paints his face black and mimicks the ghost, who leaves in embarrassment.

The following night, Qingfeng meets Geng and reveals that her uncle had disguised himself as a ghost to frighten him. Not only does her uncle disapprove of Geng, but he has also decided that the family must relocate. More than a year later, during the Qingming Festival, Geng notices two foxes being chased by two hounds. Geng rescues one fox and brings it home, while the other fox manages to escape. The two foxes turn out to be Qingfeng and her maidservant respectively. Since Qingfeng will be presumed dead, Geng proposes that she move in permanently with him as his second wife.

Two years later, an anxious Xiao'er barges into Geng's study and informs him that the elder Hu has been captured during a fox hunt by a certain Mo the Third Son (莫三郎), who happens to be the son of one of Geng's acquaintances. Claiming to still resent the old man for separating him and Qingfeng, Geng sends Xiao'er away but then assures Qingfeng that he will rescue her uncle. The next day, Geng purchases a wounded black fox from Mo. It indeed proves to be Qingfeng's uncle, who fully regains consciousness after three days. The entire Hu family moves in with Geng; Xiao'er is even asked to tutor Geng's son from his first marriage.

== Publication history ==
"Qingfeng" was first published in Pu Songling's eighteenth-century anthology of nearly five hundred short stories, titled Liaozhai zhiyi or Strange Tales from a Chinese Studio. It is one of the eighty-three fox-related stories in the collection, thirty-six of which, including "Qingfeng", involve romances between men and fox spirits.

The story is also referred to in a subsequent Liaozhai tale titled "Hu meng" or "A Fox Dream", which is the only entry in the collection "written specifically in response to a previous Liaozhai tale." In "Hu meng", the protagonist has read "Qingfeng" and desperately wishes to meet the titular fox spirit. He later befriends another fox spirit, who demands that Pu Songling write her a biographical entry of her own.

Around 1884, Chinese diplomat Chen Jitong translated several Liaozhai stories into French, including "Qingfeng", which he titled "Un sacrifice héroïque". Under the title of "Fox-Girl Qingfeng", the story was included in Strange Tales from a Make-do Studio (1989) by Denis C. Mair and Victor H. Mair.

== Legacy ==
At an April 1959 Supreme State Conference held in the wake of the Second Taiwan Strait Crisis, Chairman Mao Zedong adapted an episode from Pu's story to illustrate China's need to stand up to the United States. Mao likened the United States to a ghost harassing a scholar in his room, "(thinking that) the man would be scared to death."

However, the scholar "seized his ink brush and painted his own face as dark as that of Zhang Fei ... Then he also reached out his tongue and stared at the ghost. After a few hours, the ghost fled from the house." Mao concluded, "The author tells us that, never be afraid of the ghost. The more you are afraid, the more difficult it is to survive. The ghost will approach you and swallow you. We are unafraid of the ghost, and that is why we have shelled Jinmen and Mazu. After that battle, the Taiwan Strait became peaceful again." In February 1961, Stories of Not Being Afraid of Ghosts was published by the Institute of Literature of the Chinese Academy of Social Sciences. Mao "read and commented on all three versions of the book, making changes designed to turn it into 'a tool of political struggle and thought struggle'."
