= Shang Kexi =

Chinese general; Prince of Pingnan

- Prince of Pingnan
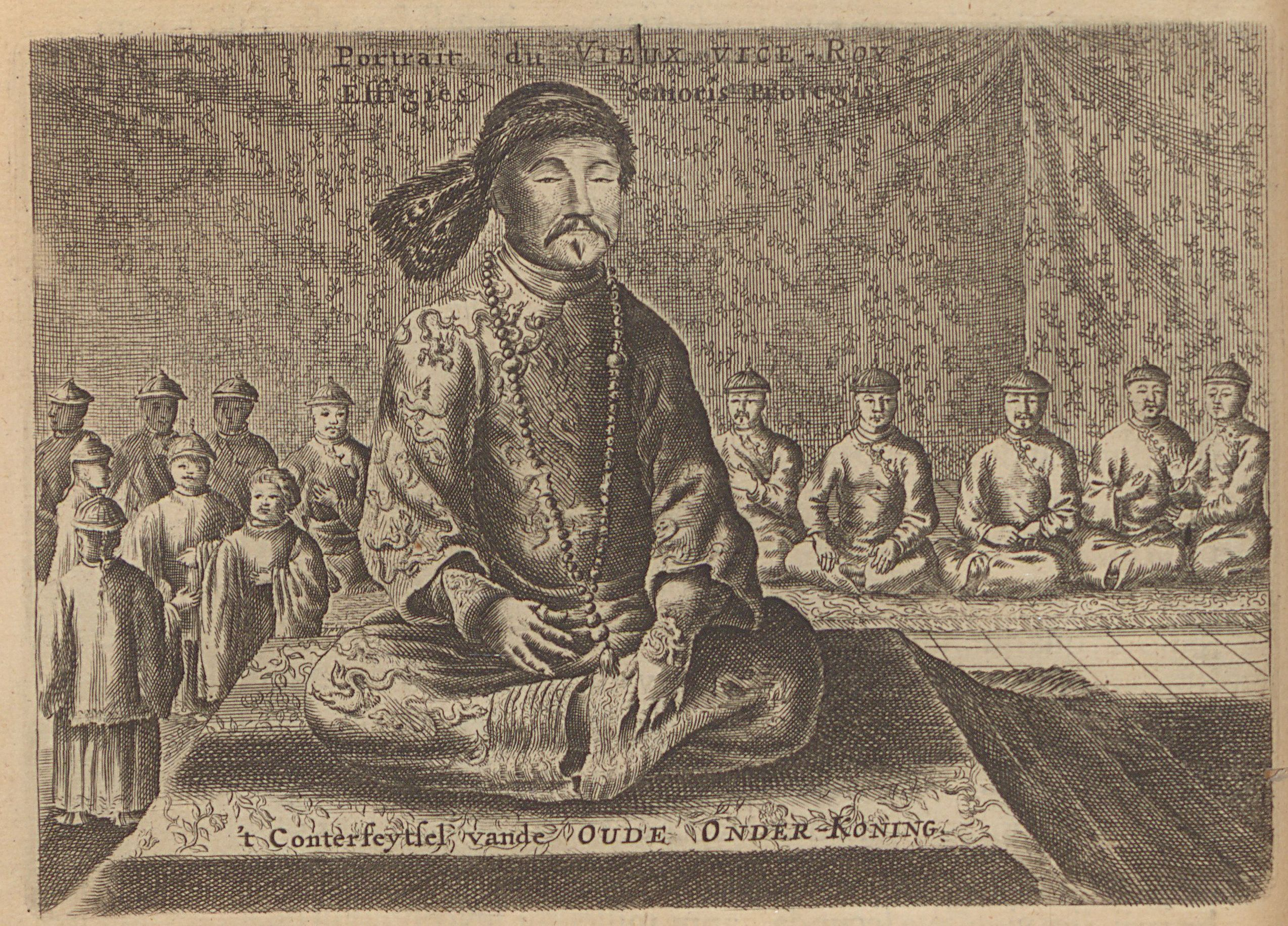
- Shang Kexi drawn by Johan Nieuhof in 1655
- Born: August 25, 1604; Liaoning
- Died: November 12, 1676 (aged 72)
- Issue: Shang Zhixin
Posthumous name
- Jing 敬 Prince Jing of Pingnan of the First Rank 平南敬親王
- Father: Shang Xueli 尚學禮

Shang Kexi (尚可喜; Shang Ko-hsi; August 25, 1604 – November 12, 1676) was a Chinese general of the Ming and Qing dynasties. In 1576, his family migrated to Liaodong, and his father, Shang Xueli, served in the army guarding the northeast frontier. As his father did, Shang Kexi joined the army and guarded the frontier against the attack of the Jurchens. Shang was described to be a brave and resourceful man who was skilful at mounted archery and capable in military matters.

With the decay and fall of the Ming emperors, Shang Kexi sought better fortune in the service of the Qing dynasty and was one of the most powerful generals that surrendered to the Qing. He fought for the Qing in Southern China and established his power in Guangdong where he ruled the territory as his own domain amassing wealth and possessing a trained army.

In 1663, the second year of the Kangxi Emperor, Shang Kexi donated property to rebuild the Dafo Temple and completed it in the following year.

In 1673 Revolt of the Three Feudatories between the Emperor and the Han princes, Wu Sangui and Geng Jingzhong, started when they opposed the Emperor's plan of resettling them in Manchuria. Shang remained loyal to the Qing and took no part in the rebellion. Shang died in 1676 and was succeeded by his son Shang Zhixin who rebelled shortly after but was defeated by the Han Chinese Green Standard forces of the Qing in 1677.

Royal titles
Preceded by none	Prince of Pingnan; 1649–1676	Succeeded by Shang Zhixin
