= 1690 in China =

- Decades: 1670s; 1680s; 1690s; 1700s; 1710s
- See also: Other events of 1690; History of China • Timeline • Years

Events from the year 1690 in China.

== Incumbents ==
- Kangxi Emperor (28th year)

== Events ==
- Dzungar–Qing Wars
  - Battle of Ulan Butung
    - By 1690, Galdan Boshugtu Khan of the Dzungars had moved down the Kerulen River into Rehe and was potentially in a position to threaten Beijing itself
    - Kangxi commissioned his own two half-brothers, Fuquan, Prince Yu and Changning, Prince Gong, as the commanding generals, dispatching Fuquan with an army north through the pass at Gubeikou, and Changning with a second force through the Xifengkou pass.
    - The emperor also sent his eldest son Yunti, Prince Xun as an assistant to Fuquan, and was himself preparing to join the forces in the field, when he was stricken by illness. The result was victory for Galdan, who held off the imperial forces at Ulan-Butung.

== Deaths ==
- Jangtai (1636–1690)
- Tong Guogang, Kangxi's uncle
