= 1686 in China =

- Decades: 1660s; 1670s; 1680s; 1690s; 1700s
- See also: Other events of 1686; History of China • Timeline • Years

Events from the year 1686 in China.

== Incumbents ==
- Kangxi Emperor (25th year)

== Events ==
- Sino-Russian border conflicts
  - Russian settlers and troops had returned to Albazin in September 1686, rebuilt the walls (this time with earth), harvested crops, and killed Qing troops

== Births ==
- Wang Shishen (1686–1759) was a Chinese painter and calligrapher during the Qing Dynasty. A native of Xiuning, Anhui . one of the Eight Eccentrics of Yangzhou and considered of the greatest Chinese painters of plum blossoms
- Yue Zhongqi (岳鍾琪, 1686 – 1754) was a Chinese military commander of the Qing dynasty. He was a descendant of Yue Fei, and served as Ministry of War and Viceroy of Chuan-Shaan during the reign of the Yongzheng Emperor.
- Yinxiang, Prince Yi (16 November 1686 – 18 June 1730), was a Manchu prince of the Qing dynasty. The thirteenth son of the Kangxi Emperor, he was made a qinwang (first-grade prince) during Yongzheng's reign and became one of his closest advisors. He died eight years into the reign of the Yongzheng Emperor and was memorialized with top honours, granted "iron-cap" status and became perpetually inheritable, one of the only twelve such princes in Qing dynasty history.

== Deaths ==
- Wei Yijie (Chinese: 魏裔介; August 19, 1616 – April 27, 1686) was a prominent Han Chinese scholar and official serving in the early Qing Dynasty, during the rules of the Shunzhi Emperor, Oboi, and the Kangxi Emperor and was known for his focus and advocacy of the reformation the Examination system.
- Cai Han (Chinese: 蔡含; 1647–1686), was a Chinese landscape painter. She was the concubine of the painter Mao Xiang and, with his other concubine Jin Yue, she was commissioned by him with the task of producing paintings as gifts to his guests; they became known as "The Two Painters of the Mao Family"
