= 1694 in China =

- Decades: 1670s; 1680s; 1690s; 1700s; 1710s
- See also: Other events of 1694; History of China • Timeline • Years

Events from the year 1694 in China.

== Incumbents ==
- Kangxi Emperor (33rd year)

== Events ==
- the three khans (Galdan Boshugtu Khan, et al.) of the Khalkha were formally inducted into the inner circles of the Qing aristocracy

== Births ==
- Wang Jun (Qing dynasty) (1694–1751), scholar and historian, taught at the Anding Academy in Yangzhou
- Wang Anguo (1694–1757)

== Deaths ==
- Noble Consort Wenxi, of the Niohuru clan (溫僖貴妃 鈕祜祿氏; d. 19 December 1694)
