= 1695 in China =

- Decades: 1670s; 1680s; 1690s; 1700s; 1710s
- See also: Other events of 1695; History of China • Timeline • Years

Events from the year 1695 in China.

== Incumbents ==
- Kangxi Emperor (34rd year)

== Events ==
- A moonloft on the Huaisheng Mosque in Guangzhou was built
- 2nd Month: the reconstruction of the Hall of Supreme Harmony begins
- 5th Month: further tours are made in the outskirts of the capital. New dams and inlets at seaports are inspected. The Temple of the Sea God (Haishen miao) is constructed.
- 6th Month: Lady Si is named the consort of Heir Apparent Yunreng.
- 11th Month: the emperor conducts a grand military inspection at the South Gardens (Nan yuan). Orders are issued for codifying the use of horns and drums in military inspections.
