= 1693 in China =

- Decades: 1670s; 1680s; 1690s; 1700s; 1710s
- See also: Other events of 1693; History of China • Timeline • Years

Events from the year 1693 in China.

== Incumbents ==
- Kangxi Emperor (32nd year)

== Events ==
- 2nd Month: imperial orders are made for eunuchs to be offered official monetary loans, similar to a system in the Eight Banners, since the eunuchs' monthly stipends are rapidly spent and due to the wretched state of their garments
- Tsewang Rabtan, rival and nephew of Galdan Boshugtu Khan, sends an envoy to Beijing, brings news that the Qing envoy Ma Di has been killed and shares secret information regarding Galdan Boshugtu Khan.
- 9th Month: reconstructions begin at Mukden (modern-day Shenyang)
- the palace memorial system are first requested by the Emperor to supplement the regular bureaucratic channels of information.

== Births ==
- Zheng Xie (鄭燮; 1693–1765), commonly known as Zheng Banqiao (鄭板橋; Zhèng Bǎnqiáo) was a Chinese painter and official from Jiangsu.
