= 1691 in China =

- Decades: 1670s; 1680s; 1690s; 1700s; 1710s
- See also: Other events of 1691; History of China • Timeline • Years

Events from the year 1691 in China.

== Incumbents ==
- Kangxi Emperor (29th year)

== Events ==
- Public Security Police Force of Macau § History: Law enforcement was first taken by the military stationed in Portuguese Macau, with Portuguese Navy troops at first before the Portuguese Army stepped in to take over internal security duties on 14 March 1691.
