= 1684 in China =

- Decades: 1660s; 1670s; 1680s; 1690s; 1700s
- See also: Other events of 1684; History of China • Timeline • Years

Events from the year 1684 in China.

== Incumbents ==
- Kangxi Emperor (23rd year)

== Events ==
- The Kangxi Emperor lifts the haijin prohibition on sea trade, allowing foreigners to enter Chinese ports in 1684
- The amount of copper in the alloys if cash coins was reduced from 70% to 60% all while the standard weight was lowered to 1 qián again, while the central government's mints in Beijing started producing cash coins with a weight of 0.7 qián.
- The first mention of chili peppers in local gazettes in Hunan. They would later become a staple of Hunanese cuisine.
- Sino-Russian border conflicts

== Deaths ==
- Yinju (胤䄔; 13 September 1683 – 17 July 1684), 19th son of Kangxi, born through an unnamed Noble Lady, of the Gorolo clan (貴人 郭絡羅氏)
- Mu'an (Chinese: 木庵性瑫; pinyin: Mù'ān Xìngtāo; Japanese Mokuan Shōtō) (1611–1684) a Chinese Chan monk who followed his master Yinyuan Longqi to Japan in 1654
