= 1688 in China =

- Decades: 1660s; 1670s; 1680s; 1690s; 1700s
- See also: Other events of 1688; History of China • Timeline • Years

Events from the year 1688 in China.

== Incumbents ==
- Kangxi Emperor (27th year)

== Events ==
- Sino-Russian border conflicts
- The Tong of Fushun, originally Han Bannermen, begin reinventing themselves as Manchu

== Births ==
- Yunti, Prince Xun (10 February 1688 – 16 February 1755), born Yinzhen and also known as Yinti before 1722, formally known as Prince Xun, was a Manchu prince and military general of the Qing dynasty

== Deaths ==
- Empress Xiaozhuangwen (28 March 1613 – 27 January 1688), of the Khorchin Mongol Borjigit clan, personal name Bumbutai, was a consort of Hong Taiji. She was 21 years his junior.
