= Sun Yanling =

Sun Yanling (Chinese: 孫延齡; Wade–Giles: Sun Yen-ling; ? — 1677) was a Han Bannerman of the Plain Red Banner who notably rebelled against Qing dynasty rule in the Revolt of the Three Feudatories. He was betrothed to be married to Kong Youde's daughter Kong Sizhen at a young age. They were married in 1660 and she was made hosoi gege, princess of royal blood. Kong Sizhen was given control of her fathers troops in Guangxi. In 1666 Princess Kong requested to move to Guangxi with her family, and Sun was made military commander in her place. Sun began making government appointments.

Following Wu Sangui's rebellion against the Qing in December 1673, Sun had all of his lieutenants killed. He joined the rebellion, declaring himself first An Yuan Da Jiang Jun (安遠大將軍), and then An Yuan Wang (安遠王).

In 1677, Wu Sangui suspected Sun would surrender to the Qing and he sent his relative Wu Shizong, to assassinate Sun. His wife took control of his troops after his death, although she may already have had control beforehand.
