= Kong Sizhen =

Chinese military commander and princess

Kong Sizhen (孔四貞; 1641 – after 1681), was a Chinese military commander and princess.

== Biography ==
Kong Sizhen was the daughter of Kong Youde (died 1652), a Chinese military commander awarded with the title of princess for his service to the Qing dynasty.

At age 11, she was one of the only survivors of an attack by Southern Ming general Li Dingguo, in which the rest of her family was killed. To honour her father, who had died (possibly committing suicide), she was given honours, including being appointed princess. Additionally, as she was her father's only surviving heir, she was given nominal command over her father's remaining troops in Guangxi.

In 1660 she married Sun Yanling, who was subsequently appointed (filling her nominal role) as military governor in Guangxi. His father had been one of her father Kong Youde's lieutenants. Due to her high status, her husband's status was also raised. His position as military governor was actually a case of him filling a position that belonged to her. Though he was a military commander, he seemed to not be very skilled, or to have a tendency to overextend his own authority, resulting in several imperial reprimands.

Her spouse joined the rebellion of Wu Sangui, which caused him to be deposed of by his army. Kong Sizhen, who remained loyal to the crown, became her husband's successor by 1677, which was confirmed by the Emperor in 1676, a very unusual position for a woman in Qing dynasty China. She kept her position until the end of the rebellion.
