= 1685 in China =

- Decades: 1660s; 1670s; 1680s; 1690s; 1700s
- See also: Other events of 1685; History of China • Timeline • Years

Events from the year 1685 in China.

== Incumbents ==
- Kangxi Emperor (24th year)

== Events ==
- In 1685, four customs were set up in Guangzhou (Guangdong Province), Xiamen (Fujian Province), Ningbo (Zhejiang Province), and Songjiang (Jiangsu Province) to deal with trade with foreign countries
- Sino-Russian border conflicts
  - The siege of Albazino in Jaxa began on June 23, 1685. On the 26th there was an indecisive day-long battle. The Manchus thereupon piled dry wood along the fort's wooden walls and when they began to light it, Tolbuzin surrendered (exact date uncertain). The 600 or so defenders were allowed to withdraw to Nerchinsk. About 45 opted to go with the Manchus where they joined the Russian colony in Peking. The Manchus burned the fort and withdrew, but did not destroy the crops. When news of the defeat reached Moscow in November it was decided to abandon the Amur and send an ambassador to Peking. The Qing troops constituted of former Southern Ming marines from Taiwan, renowned for their knowledge of nautical warfare.
- According to Daqing Huidian, Anhui province had 35.43 million mu (2.362 ×10^{6} hectares) of privately cultivated land.

== Deaths ==
- July 1 – Nalan Xingde (born 1655), Chinese Qing Dynasty poet most famous for his ci poetry
