= 1692 in China =

- Decades: 1670s; 1680s; 1690s; 1700s; 1710s
- See also: Other events of 1692; History of China • Timeline • Years

Events from the year 1692 in China.

Qing Dynasty

== Incumbents ==
- Monarch - Kangxi Emperor.

=== Viceroys ===
- Viceroy of Min-Zhe — Zhou Hongzuo
- Viceroy of Huguang — Wu Tian
- Viceroy of Shaan-Gan — Wuhe
- Viceroy of Liangguang — Shi Lin
- Viceroy of Yun-Gui — Li Shiyao
- Viceroy of Sichuan — Wuhe
- Viceroy of Liangjiang — Fan Chengxun

== Events ==
- Kangxi Emperor recognized Roman Catholic Church.

== Births ==
- Empress Xiaoshengxian
- Li E

== Deaths ==
- Wang Fuzhi
