= Chen Jitong =

Chinese diplomat, general, scholar, and shipbuilder

- 陳季同
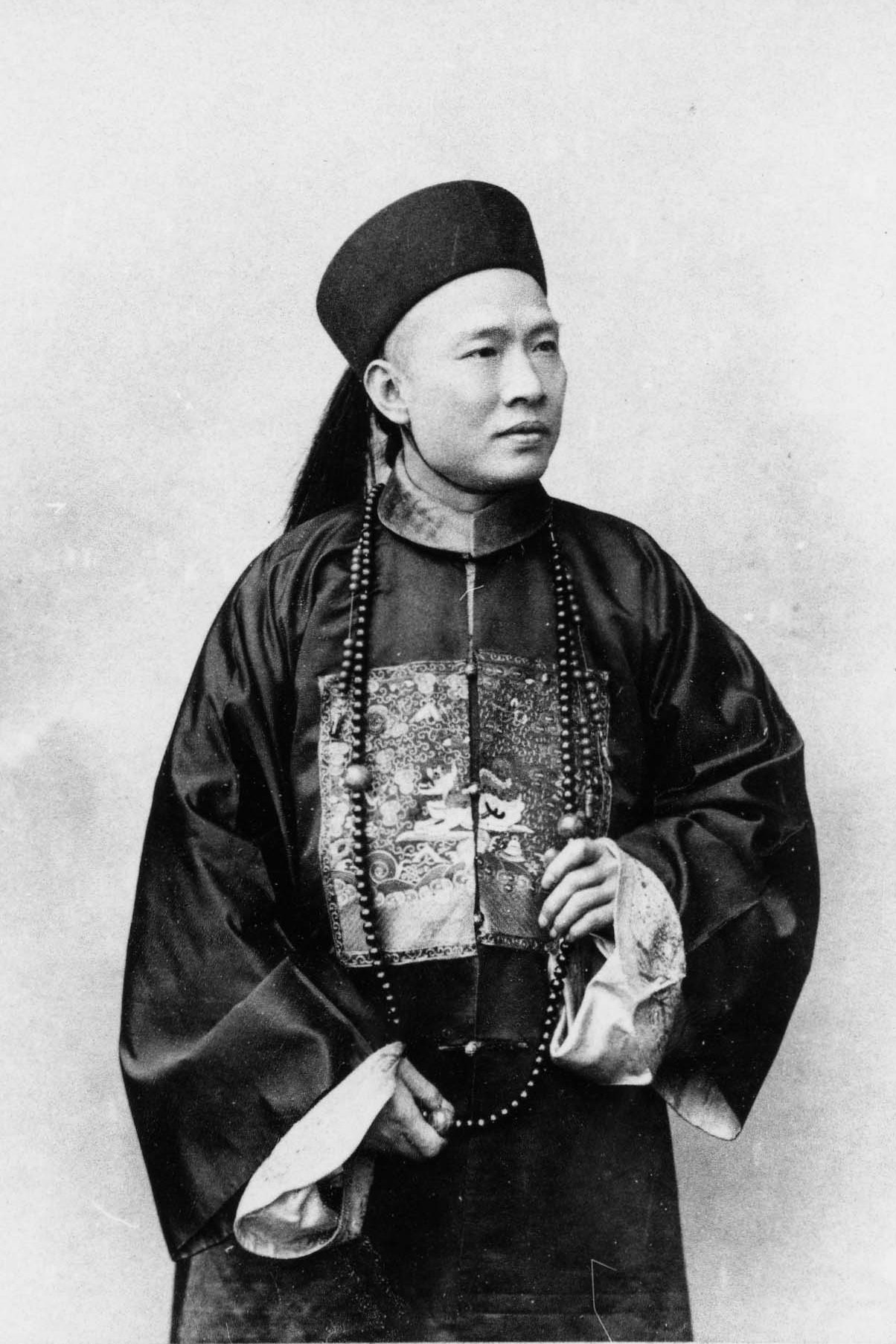

Chinese Ambassador to the UK
- In office ?–?
- Monarch: Guangxu

Chinese Ambassador to France
- In office ?–?
- Monarch: Guangxu

Personal details
- Born: 1 January 1851 (Qing dynasty) Houguan, Fujian, Qing Dynasty, China
- Died: 1 January 1907 (aged 56) (Qing dynasty) ?? Qing Dynasty, China
- Relatives: Chen Shoupeng (陈寿彭)
- Education: Sciences Po
- Occupation: Diplomat

Chen Jitong (simplified Chinese: 陈季同; traditional Chinese: 陳季同; pinyin: Chén Jìtóng; 1851–1907), courtesy name Jingru (敬如), also known as Tcheng Ki-tong, was a Chinese diplomat, general, scholar, and shipbuilder during the late Qing dynasty. Chen was born in Houguan, now in present-day Minhou, Fuzhou. In 1869 he started to study the French language at the school attached to the Fuzhou shipyard. In 1875 Shen Baozhen sent thirty Chinese students, from the training school attached to the Foochow Arsenal to study shipbuilding and navigation in Europe. In 1876, Chen Jitong was selected to go to Europe and he wrote a book on his impressions after his return to China the following year. He subsequently served on a number of important positions in the Qing foreign service. While serving as a diplomat in France, he wrote several famous works in French, becoming the first Francophone Chinese author.

In 1891, he was dismissed from all official positions and settled in Shanghai. Following China's defeat in the First Sino-Japanese War, he served as foreign minister of the short-lived Republic of Formosa.

== Writings ==
- -- Tcheng-ki-tong, Les Chinois peints par eux memes Paris: Levy, 1884. Internet Archive
- -- Journal d'un mandarin: lettres de Chine et documents diplomatiques inédits Paris: Plom, 1887. Internet Archive
- -- The Chinese painted by themselves. Translated from the French by James Millington. London: Field & Tuer, [1885?]
- -- Tcheng-Ki-Tong, Chin-Chin or The Chinaman at Home. Tr. R. H. Sherard. London: A. P. Marsden, 1895.
- -- Contes chinois Paris: Levy, 1889.
