= Geng Shuai =

Chinese craftsman

- Born: 1987 (age 38–39); Hebei, China
- Occupations: Inventor, craftsman

Bilibili information
- Channel: 手工耿
- Years active: 2018–present
- Followers: 8.13 million
- Last updated: 2 March 2026

Geng Shuai (Chinese: 耿帥), dubbed the China's Useless Edison, is a Chinese village craftsman. He has more than 2.7 million followers on the Chinese short video app Kuaishou and almost a million followers on Weibo. Notable videos include 'a treadmill enclosed in a cage', that would open only when a selected amount of time had passed by.
