= Shang Zhixin =

Qing dynasty warlord

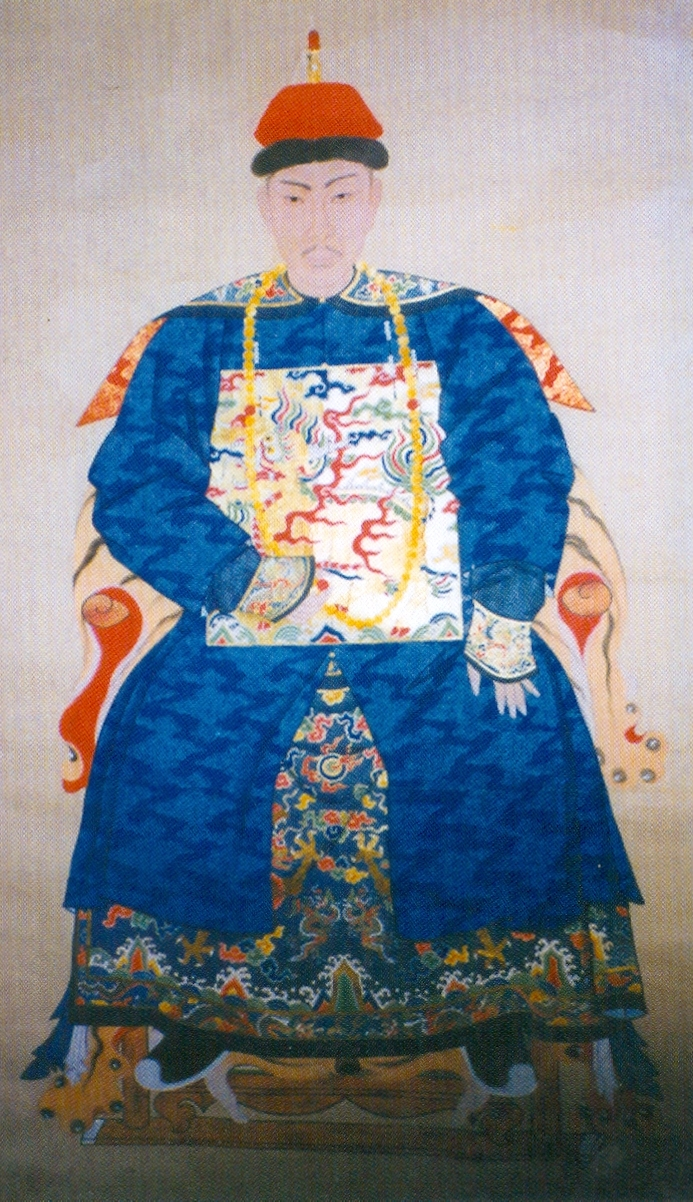
Portrait of Shang Zhixin

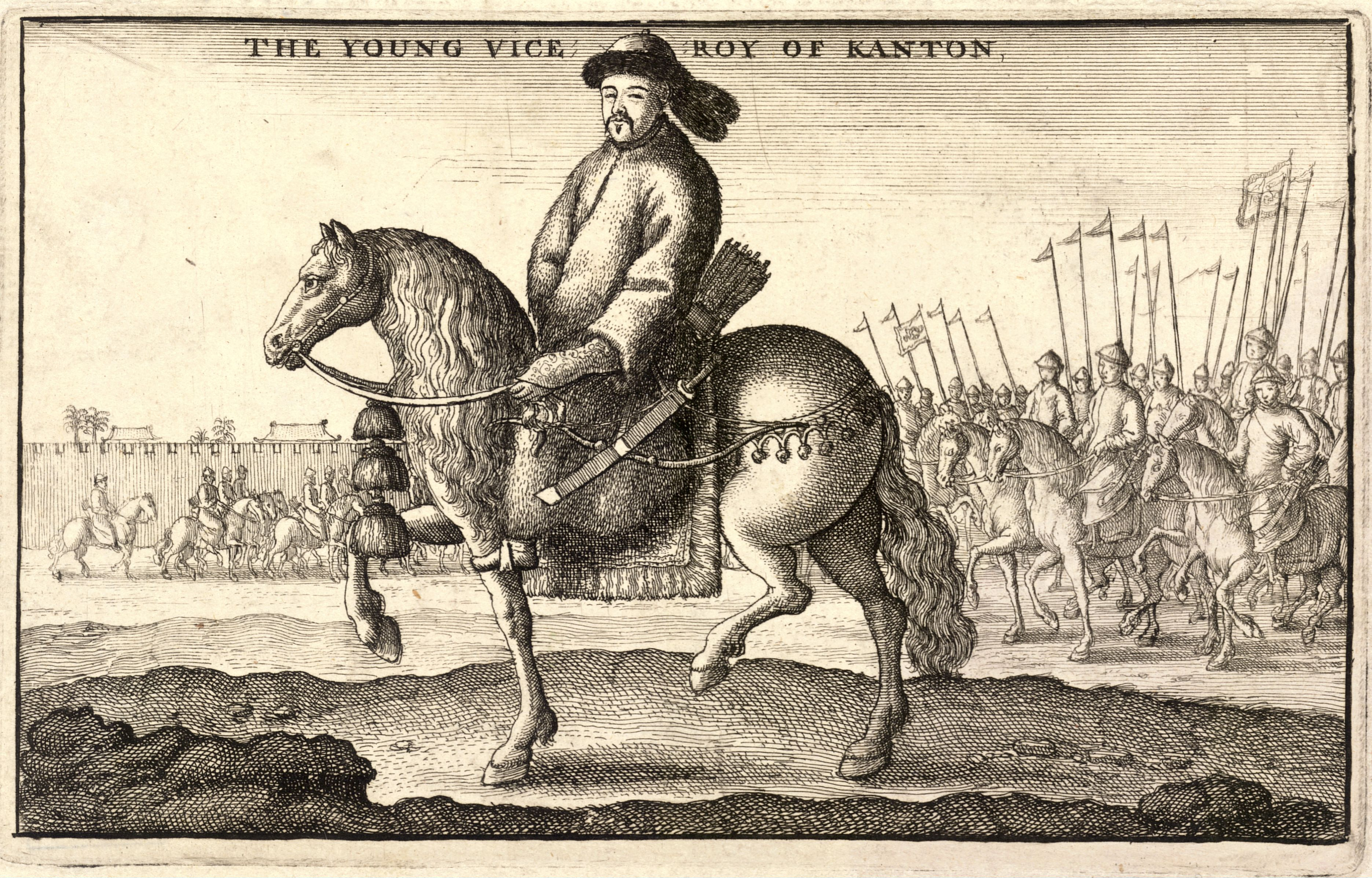
Engraving of Shang Zhixin by Wenceslaus Hollar

Shang Zhixin (Chinese: 尚之信; 1636 – 1680) was a warlord of the early Qing Dynasty, known for his role in the Revolt of the Three Feudatories. He was Prince of Pingnan (平南王, "Prince who Pacifies the South"), inheriting his position from his father Shang Kexi, who abandoned the Ming dynasty and surrendered to the Qing dynasty. In 1673, Shang Kexi, on account of old age, requested the Kangxi Emperor to allow him to retire back in his adopted homeland Liaodong. He thus passed his position to Shang Zhixin, his eldest son. As Prince of Pingnan, he was in charge of the defence of Guangdong province.

Not long afterwards, the Qing court, as part of its policy of centralization, decided to abolish Pingnan Feudatory under the pretext that Shang Zhixin was "difficult to control". Shang Kexi, who was then still in Guangdong, was willing to accept this and made preparations to move his entire family back to Haicheng. However, the rebellion of the Pingxi and Jingnan feudatories, under Wu Sangui and Geng Jingzhong respectively, put an end to these plans. Shang Zhixin was ordered to give military command back to his father, who was still loyal to the Qing. However, many of his men deserted to the rebel camp. From 1673 to 1676, Guangzhou held out as a Qing fortress in the midst of rebel-held territory.

In early 1676, forces loyal to Shang Zhixin placed Shang Kexi under house arrest. Having gained the military command of Pingnan Feudatory, Shang Zhixin promptly joined Wu Sangui's forces. However, after Shang Kexi's death in late 1676 (and also following the surrender of rebel generals such as Wang Fuchen), Shang Zhixin changed his mind and defected back to the Qing. The Qing court ordered him to lead troops against Wu Sangui, but Shang Zhixin only made token efforts, hoping to preserve his own forces.

In 1679, Kangxi stripped Shang Zhixin of much of his military powers. In 1680, with a Qing victory imminent, Shang Zhixin was arrested, brought to Beijing and ordered to commit suicide. In return for killing himself, Shang Zhixin's family was spared from punishment. Shang had 36 brothers: four of them were executed during Shang Zhixin's suicide while the rest of them were allowed to live. Shang was known for his famously cruel reign. Some of his personal enemies were ripped apart by hunting dogs for opposing him.

Royal titles
Preceded by Shang Zhixiao	Prince of Pingnan; 1677–1680	Succeeded by title abolished
