= Dream Memories of Tao'an =

1775 essay collection by Zhang Dai

Cover of a copy of the Dream Memories of Tao'an

Dream Memories of Tao'an (Chinese: 陶庵梦忆; pinyin: Táo'ān mèng yì) is a collection of autobiographical essays written by Ming dynasty scholar Zhang Dai (1597–1684), written c. 1665 but only published in 1775. It is considered one of Zhang's most famous works and an ideal example of the xiaopin style of essays produced during the late Ming dynasty.

== Background ==
Zhang Dai was born into an esteemed and cultured family. He led a comfortable and refined life in his early years. Following the Jiashen Incident that overthrown the Ming dynasty, Zhang Dai served as an aide to Prince of Lu and participated in efforts to restore the Ming dynasty. After the fall of the Southern Ming, Zhang Dai's family fortune was depleted. He retreated to the mountains and spent his later years enduring poverty and hardship. Dream Memories of Tao'an was written during this period, although it wasn't published until 1775, forty years into the Qianlong reign.

== Title and content ==
The book takes its name from the concept of dreams. Zhang Dai confessed in the preface that the past "glory, honor, and wealth" were all but "one dream", and that by compiling a recollection "in front of the Buddha", he was "repenting" the casual and excessive luxury and pleasure from his earlier years. Yet as noted by Chang, the repentance is rather paradoxical than purely lamenting. As many essays in the collection are perfect examples of refined literati lifestyle and late Ming connoisseurship.

While the underlying mood in this nostalgic recollection of a lost world may be bitter, the narrations are filled with charming visions of the past: it could be vibrant scenes of the tourist crowds and drinking parties on the West Lake, as in "Mid-July at the West Lake" (西湖七月半, Xi hu qi yue ban), or a sense of tranquil solitude on a snowy winter day, as in "A Snow Day at the West Lake" (湖心亭看雪, Hu xin ting kan xue). The lines are filled with wisdom, humor, and a keen sense of irony.

The book contains eight volumes and a total of 124 short essays. The styles of these essays are often informal, and their length can range from a few lines to a few pages in translation. The topics and events covered are expansive, they can be significant or oftentimes trivial. There are abundant records on "gardens, artworks, theatre, courtesan", teahouses, folklores, calligraphies, antiques, flowers, excursions, ponds, and mountains of the author's time.

The reading experience is pleasant, as it sheds lights to the late Ming dynasty and Chinese literature as whole. The book also offers a lucid portrayal of the people, their daily life, customs, and social landscape in the Jiangnan region of late Ming, and is considered a key reference document for scholars studying tangible culture heritage of the Ming dynasty.
