= Geng Juzhong =

Son of Geng Jimao and brother of Geng Jingzhong

Geng Juzhong (Chinese: 耿聚忠; 1650 – 1687) was the third son of Geng Jimao and brother of Geng Jingzhong and court member of the Qing dynasty. He was a Third Class Viscount (三等子).

Princess Roujia (和硕柔嘉公主), the daughter of the Manchu Aisin Gioro Prince Yolo (岳樂, Prince An) was wedded to Geng Juzhong.

When Geng Jingzhong rebelled against the Qing dynasty, Geng Juzhong was in Beijing with the Qing court with the Kangxi Emperor and was not punished by the Kangxi Emperor for his brother's revolt. Geng died of natural causes in 1687.
