= Geng Jimao =

- Prince of Jingnan
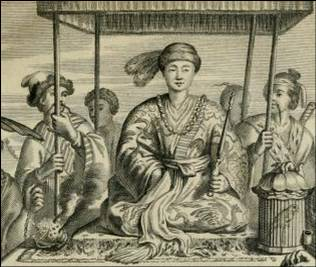
- Reign: 1651-1671
- Predecessor: Geng Zhongming
- Successor: Geng Jingzhong
- Issue: Geng Jingzhong; Geng Zhaozhong; Geng Juzhong; Shang Zhixin's wife

Geng Jimao or Keng Chi-mao (Chinese: 耿繼茂; pinyin: Gěng Jìmào; died 1671) was a Chinese prince and military leader. He inherited the title of "Jingnan Prince" (靖南王 Jingnan wang), meaning "Prince who pacifies the South", from his father Geng Zhongming, along with his lands. He then passed it on to his son Geng Jingzhong.

At the time of his father's suicide, Geng Jimao led an army of the Qing dynasty to fight the Southern Ming.

The "Dolo efu" (和碩額駙) rank was given to husbands of Qing princesses. Geng Jingmao managed to have both his sons Geng Jingzhong and Geng Zhaozhong (耿昭忠) become court attendants under the Shunzhi Emperor and have them married to Aisin Gioro women. Prince Abatai's granddaughter married Geng Zhaozhong, and Haoge's (a son of Hong Taiji) daughter married Geng Jingzhong.

Princess Roujia (和硕柔嘉公主), daughter of the Manchu Aisin Gioro Prince Yolo (岳樂), Prince An, was wedded to Geng Juzhong, another son of Geng Jingmao.

Royal titles
Preceded by Geng Zhongming	Prince of Jingnan; 1649–1671	Succeeded by Geng Jingzhong
