= Geng Jingzhong =

- Prince of Jingnan
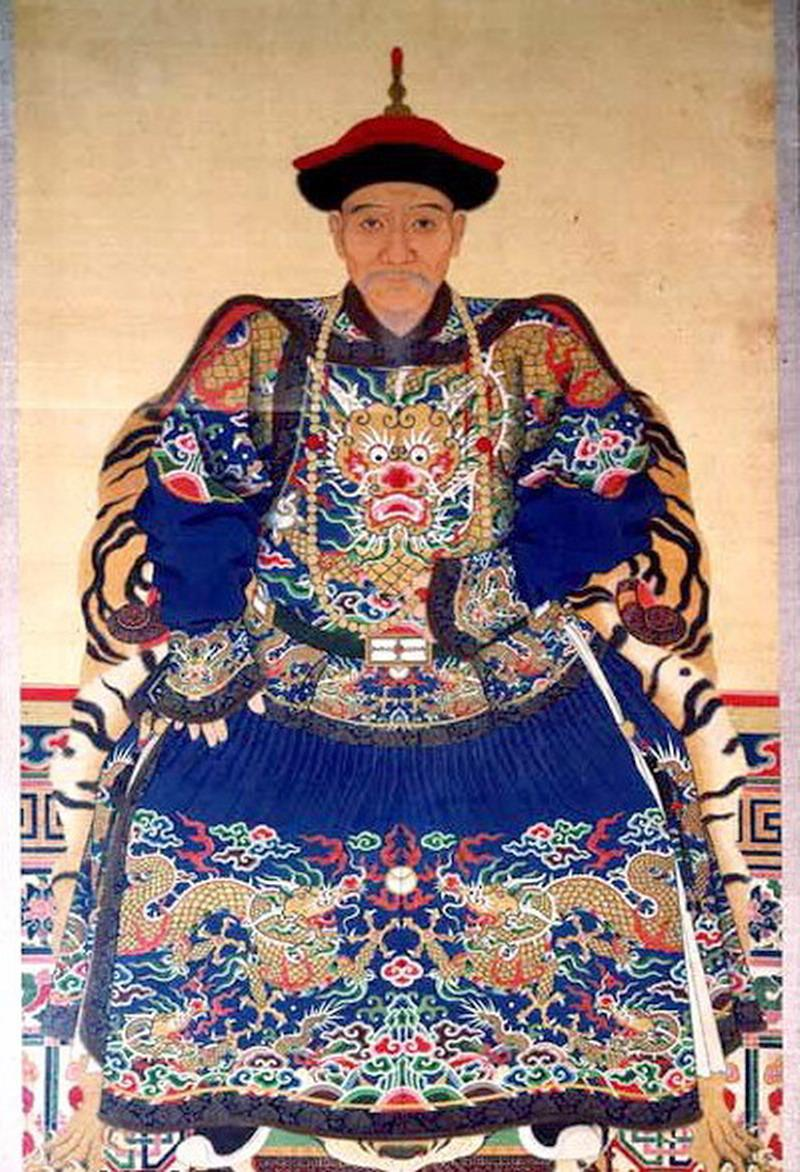
- Reign: 1671-1681
- Predecessor: Geng Jimao
- Successor: title abolished

Geng Jingzhong (Chinese: 耿精忠; pinyin: Gěng Jīngzhōng; Wade–Giles: Keng Ching-chung; died 1682) was a powerful military commander of the early Qing dynasty. He inherited the title of "King/Prince of Jingnan" (靖南王) from his father Geng Jimao, who had inherited it from Jingzhong's grandfather Geng Zhongming.

The "Dolo efu" (和碩額駙) rank was given to husbands of Qing princesses. Geng Jingmao managed to have both his sons Geng Jingzhong and Geng Zhaozhong (耿昭忠) become court attendants under the Shunzhi Emperor and marry Aisin Gioro women, with Prince Abatai's granddaughter marrying Geng Zhaozhong 耿昭忠 and Hooge's (a son of Hong Taiji) daughter marrying Geng Jingzhong. Geng Juzhong married Princess Heshou Roujia (和硕柔嘉公主) of the Manchu Aisin Gioro clan and daughter of Prince Yolo (岳樂), Prince An.

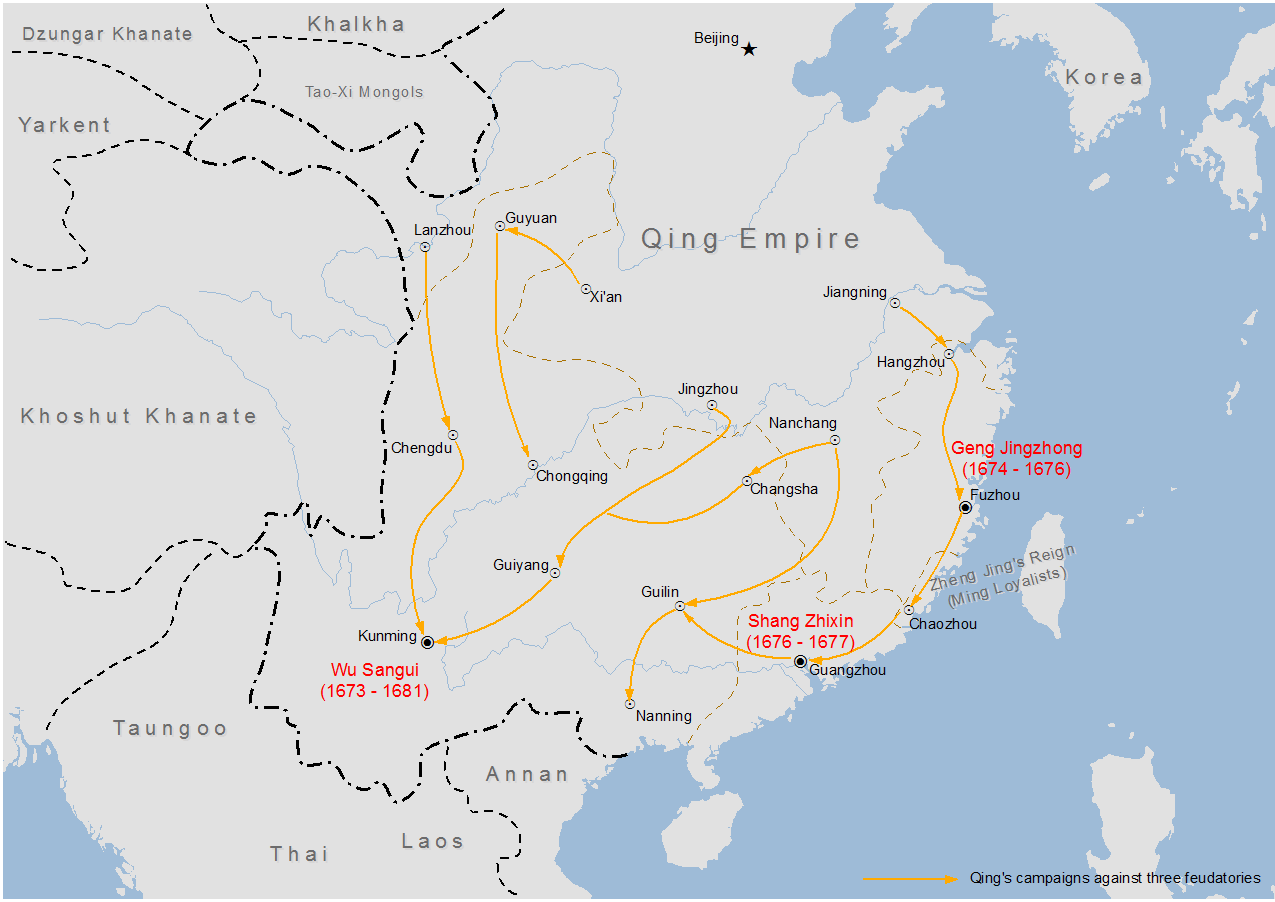
Map showing the Revolt of the Three Feudatories

Firmly entrenched as a quasi independent ruler in Fujian, in 1674 Geng Jingzhong rebelled against Qing rule along with the other two of the Three Feudatories Wu Sangui and Shang Zhixin, who were also governing enormous principalities in south China. On November 6, Yanping fell to armies commanded by Jieshu, Qing armies eventually defeated Geng, who surrendered in 1676 and pledged his support to putting down the other revolting feudatories. The Qing then used Geng's troops to fight the other feudatories until the civil war ended. Soon after the Qing final victory in 1681, the Kangxi Emperor had Geng executed by slow slicing for treason.

Geng Jingzhong's brother Geng Juzhong was in Beijing with the Qing court with the Kangxi Emperor during the rebellion and was not punished by the Kangxi Emperor for his brother's revolt. Geng Juzhong died of natural causes in 1687. Geng Juzhong was a Third Class Viscount (三等子).

Royal titles
Preceded by Geng Jimao	Prince of Jingnan; 1671–1681	Succeeded by title abolished
