= Liu Guoxuan =

17th-century Tungning naval officer

Liu Guoxuan Wuping Marquis
- 劉國軒
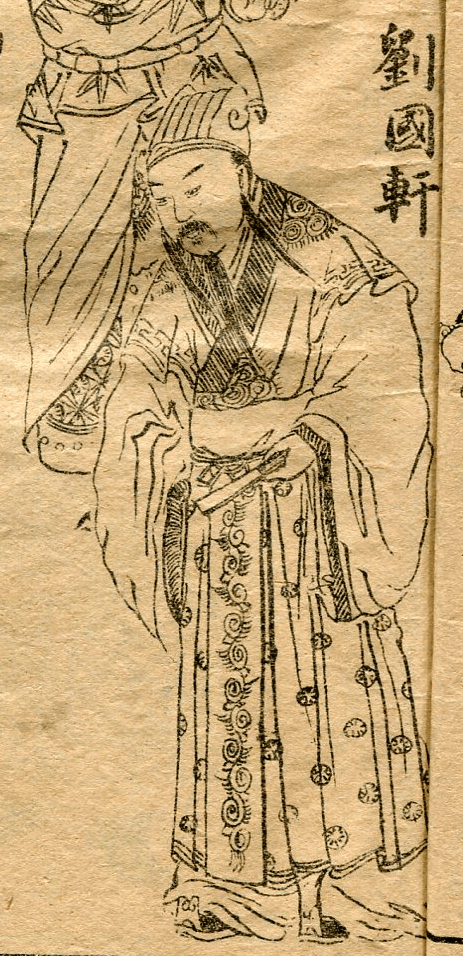

Personal details
- Born: 1628
- Died: 1693 (aged 64–65)
- Nobility titles: Marquis, and later, count
- Battles: The siege of Fort Zeelandia and the Battle of Penghu

Liu Guoxuan
- Traditional Chinese: 劉國軒
- Simplified Chinese: 刘国轩
Transcriptions
Standard Mandarin
- Hanyu Pinyin: Liú Guóxuān

Liu Guoxuan (1628–1693) was the Wuping Marquis and a 17th-century military officer of the Kingdom of Tungning based in Taiwan. He fought all over the island of Taiwan and the nearby mainland. He also commanded the Penghu defense during the Battle of Penghu.

== Early life ==
Liu Guoxuan was born in the mountain town of Sidu on the borders of Changting, Fujian and Ruijin, Jiangxi. When he was 18, he went to Zhangzhou, Fujian to join the army under Lin Shiyong, first as a soldier and then the commander of the city gate. He admired Zheng Chenggong's deeds very much. Liu conspired with Lin Shiyong against their commanding general to help Zheng Chenggong take the city of Zhangzhou.

== Career in Tungning ==
In 1659, Liu Guoxuan accompanied Zheng Chenggong to fight south of the Yangtze River. He also participated in the siege of Fort Zeelandia. After Zheng Chenggong's death, Liu was deployed around the island by Zheng Jing, the new ruler. In 1674, Liu took advantage of the Revolt of the Three Feudatories and attacked the mainland, taking a lot of land. Finally, in 1680, the Three Feudatories were soon-to-be defeated and Zheng Jing's army was defeated in Fujian. Liu Guoxuan had to rescue and retreat with Zheng Jing back to the Penghu islands.

Liu Guoxuan became allies with Feng Xifan and together they successfully ousted rival official Chen Yonghua from the political arena in 1680. After Zheng Jing's death in 1681, they slandered Zheng Kezang in front of Queen Dowager Dong. They claimed that Zheng Kezang was not a biological son of Zheng Jing and subsequently they launched a coup to kill Zheng Kezang and seize power. The result of the coup was 12-year-old Zheng Keshuang taking the throne. He was made the Wuping Marquis (武平侯) in 1681 and was put in charge of the military of Tungning.

=== The Battle of Penghu ===
In 1683, the Kangxi Emperor sent Admiral Shi Lang to attack Tungning with about 21,000 men and 238 warships. Liu Guoxuan led the Penghu defense fleet to drive back Shi Lang before a major hurricane struck, which was successful.

After the hurricane ended, the forces engaged in battle once again. Liu predicted that the Qing navy would send a small detachment around the battle to land directly on his land base so he had archers and cannons on the beaches along with a detachment of soldiers. Shi Lang's navy took the Hujing Island and the Tongpan Island on July 12. During the battle, the Qing navy smashed and broke Liu's formation.

Due to the better equipped Qing navy, most of the Tungning fleet was under the ocean within an hour. Liu's fleet surrendered when they had run out of ammunition to continue fighting. Their land base was also taken by many skilled Qing generals. It was said that Mazu, a Chinese sea goddess personally aided Shi Lang in defeating Liu.

=== Surrender of Tungning ===
Liu Guoxuan was about to commit suicide when he was stopped by Shi Lang. After a brief talk about the battle, Liu was freed. After the battle, the Tungning royal court split into two factions: the "war" faction and the "surrender" faction. Ruler Zheng Keshuang heeded Liu's advice to surrender.

== Later years and death ==
After surrendering, Liu Guoxuan was summoned to Beijing by the Kangxi emperor. He was given a title of a count (伯) and worked as the commander of a city gate in Beijing. In 1693, he succumbed to his illness and died in Tianjin. He was posthomusly given the titles of "Guanglu Dafu" (光禄大夫) and "Taizi Shaobao" (太子少保) – literally the "Bright Prosperity Grand Master" and the "Assistant Protector of the Crown Prince."

== In popular culture ==
- The Deer and the Cauldron, a wuxia novel by Jin Yong. Liu Guoxuan is a minor character and one of the "Five Tiger Generals" under Koxinga.
- Kangxi Dynasty, a 2001 Chinese television series based on the novel Kangxi Da Di (康熙大帝; The Great Kangxi Emperor) by Eryue He. Liu Guoxuan is a minor character played by actor Zhang Suguo.

== Bibliography ==
- Wong, Young-tsu (2017) China's Conquest of Taiwan in the Seventeenth Century: Victory at Full Moon. Springer. ISBN 978-9811022470
- Hung, Chien-chao (1981). Taiwan Under the Cheng Family, 1662–1683: Sinicization After Dutch Rule (Ph.D. dissertation). Georgetown University. OCLC 63232462.
