= Feng Xifan =

Chinese official

- 馮錫範

Personal details
- Born: circa 1600s
- Died: late 1600s
- Nobility title: Count Zhongcheng (忠誠伯)

Feng Xifan
- Traditional Chinese: 馮錫範
- Simplified Chinese: 冯锡范
Transcriptions
Standard Mandarin
- Hanyu Pinyin: Féng Xīfàn
- Wade–Giles: Feng Hsi-fan
Southern Min
- Hokkien POJ: Pâng Sik-hoān
- Tâi-lô: Pâng Sik-huān

Feng Xifan (fl. 17th century) was a Chinese official who initially served in the Kingdom of Tungning in Taiwan before he surrendered to the Qing dynasty.

== Life ==
Feng Xifan was born in Jinjiang County, Quanzhou Prefecture, Fujian Province, but his ancestral home was in Longxi County, Zhangzhou Prefecture. His father, Feng Chengshi (馮澄世), served as an official under Zheng Chenggong, the Prince of Yanping, who was a loyalist of the fallen Ming dynasty.

During the transition from the Ming dynasty to the Manchu-led Qing dynasty, Feng Xifan and his father joined Zheng Chenggong in resisting the Qing forces in Fujian Province before they established their base of operations in Taiwan, where the Kingdom of Tungning was founded.

After Zheng Chenggong died in 1662, a power struggle broke out between his eldest son Zheng Jing and fifth son Zheng Xi (鄭襲). A group of officials headed by Huang Zhao (黃昭) and Xiao Gongchen (蕭拱宸) opposed Zheng Jing's claim to the throne of Tungning, so they supported Zheng Xi and proclaimed him "Regent of Yanping".

At the time, Zheng Jing was in Xiamen and his legitimacy was recognised by Zheng Chenggong's former followers based in the coastal regions of Fujian Province, so he gathered them and led them to attack Zheng Xi in Taiwan. Zheng Jing regarded Feng Xifan highly and appointed him as a personal bodyguard. The forces of Zheng Jing and Zheng Xi clashed off the coast of Chikan (present-day Tainan), where Huang Zhao was killed during the battle. After the battle, those who initially supported Zheng Xi surrendered to Zheng Jing, who became the new ruler of Tungning. With support from officials such as Chen Yonghua, Zheng Jing implemented policies to pacify the people of Taiwan and, as a gesture of kindness, spared Zheng Xi's life but had his brother placed under house arrest in Xiamen.

In 1679, Zheng Jing appointed his eldest son Zheng Kezang as regent and delegated some state affairs to him. Besides, Zheng Kezang had married the daughter of Chen Yonghua, who also served as his tutor. Known for being decisive and strong-willed, Zheng Kezang enforced the law strictly and did not hesitate to punish members of the Zheng family when they broke the law. As a result, he incurred resentment from the nobles and aristocrats, including Feng Xifan.

After Zheng Jing died in 1680, Feng Xifan, Liu Guoxuan and others launched a coup against Zheng Kezang and killed him. With approval from Queen Dowager Dong, they installed Zheng Jing's second son Zheng Keshuang on the throne.

In 1683, after Tungning forces were defeated by Qing forces at the Battle of Penghu, Feng Xifan and others convinced Zheng Keshuang to surrender to the Qing dynasty. Following the surrender, the Qing government awarded Feng Xifan the nobility title "Count Zhongcheng" (忠誠伯).

== In fiction ==
Feng Xifan appears as a minor antagonist in the wuxia novel The Deer and the Cauldron by Jin Yong. In the novel, he is a formidable swordsman from the Kunlun Sect serving as Zheng Keshuang's martial arts master.
