= Chen Yonghua =

Late 17th century Tungning minister

- 陈永华
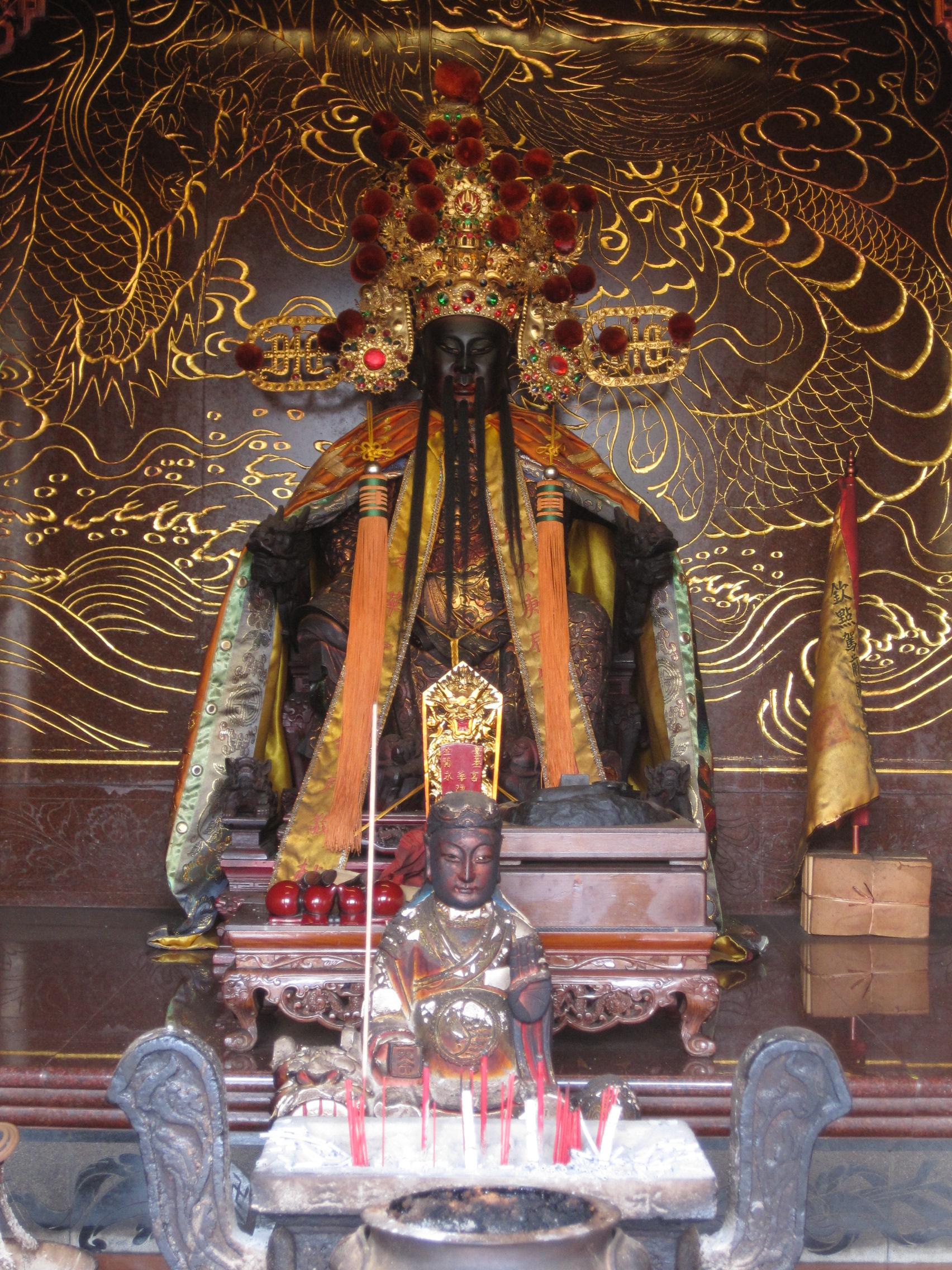

Personal details
- Born: 1634
- Died: July 1680 (aged 45–46)

Chen Yonghua
- Traditional Chinese: 陳永華
- Simplified Chinese: 陈永华
Transcriptions
Standard Mandarin
- Hanyu Pinyin: chén yǒng huá
Southern Min
- Hokkien POJ: Tân Éng-hôa
- Tâi-lô: Tân Íng-huâ

Chen Yonghua (Chinese: 陳永華; Pe̍h-ōe-jī: Tân Éng-hôa; 1634–1680), courtesy name Fufu (Chinese: 復甫; Pe̍h-ōe-jī: Ho̍k-hú)), was a prominent official of the Kingdom of Tungning in Taiwan in the late 17th century. He was from the region near modern-day Quanzhou.

== Biography ==
Chen Yonghua was born in 1634 in the region near modern-day Jiaomei. In 1648, Chen's father was forced to commit suicide by the invading Qing dynasty's army. Chen took refuge under Koxinga and became his son Zheng Jing's tutor.

=== Career ===
After Koxinga's death in 1662, a power struggle broke out between Zheng Jing and Kozinga's fifth son Zheng Xi (鄭襲). A group of officials headed by Huang Zhao (黃昭) and Xiao Gongchen (蕭拱辰) opposed Zheng Jing succeeding to the throne of Tungning. Chen Yonghua led an army with many others against Huang Zhao in Tainan. Huang Zhao was defeated and killed while Zheng Xi was put under house arrest. After the power struggle ended, Zheng Jing promoted Chen to the position as the Chief Minister of Tungning by the new ruler Zheng Jing.

Chen introduced Chinese bureaucracy and introduced a salt production method to the coastal areas. The method worked by the evaporation of water and created high-quality salt, making Tungning self-sufficient. Chen is also credited for introducing agricultural techniques such as storing water for annual dry periods and growing sugar cane as a cash crop. Chen also created many new policies to develop Tungning's agriculture, education, finance, industry, and trade. He also created a harsh tax system.

In 1664, Zheng Jing lost a campaign against the Qing dynasty and many people left Tungning for the Qing dynasty. Zhen Jing was thinking about surrendering, but Chen Yonghua told him that all the people who surrendered were slaves and merchants who lied to the Qing dynasty. In 1665, Chen also built the first Confucian temple, the Tainan Confucian Temple, as well as an academy. In the 1674, Chen's daughter married the Crown Prince Zheng Kezang when Zheng Jing went on another campaign against the Qing dynasty. Zheng left Chen in charge of the kingdom.

=== Death ===
After coming back from a failed campaign in 1680, Feng Xifan and Liu Guoxuan ousted Chen Yonghua from power out of jealousy. Chen died in July 1680 and was buried in the mountains near Tainan.

== In popular culture ==
- The Deer and the Cauldron is a wuxia novel by Jin Yong. In the novel, the martial arts master and leader of the Tiandi Society Chen Jinnan is believed to have been based on Chen Yonghua. Chen Jinnan is later killed by Zheng Keshuang and his master Feng Xifan.
