= Chen Yong Hua =

陳永華 may refer to:

- Chan Wing-wah (born 1954), Chinese conductor and composer
- Chen Yonghua (1634–1680), a prominent official of the Kingdom of Tungning in Taiwan

== See also ==
- Chen (surname)
