= House of Koxinga =

Ruling dynasty of the Kingdom of Tungning in Taiwan (1655-1683)

House of Koxinga 鄭氏 / Zheng
- Royal family in East Asia
- Flag of the Kingdom of Tungning
- Country: Chongzhen of Ming (1628); Longwu of Southern Ming (1645); Yongli of Southern Ming (1646); Kingdom of Tungning (1661)
- Founded: 1655 Founder's elevation to Prince of Yanping
- Founder: Koxinga
- Final ruler: Zheng Keshuang
- Titles: Prince of Yanping (延平王); King of Tungning (東寧國王); King of Daepeon (大樊國主); King of Taiwan; Sia (舍)
- Dissolution: 1683
- Deposition: Defeated by the Qing Dynasty in the Battle of Penghu
- Cadet branches: Tagawa-shi

The House of Koxinga, also known as the Zheng dynasty, was the ruling family of the Kingdom of Tungning in Taiwan. They played a significant role in the history of East Asia and Southeast Asia, particularly during the seventeenth century.

== Names ==
In Chinese, the dynasty is referred to as:

- The Zheng clan (Chinese: 鄭氏; Pe̍h-ōe-jī: Tēⁿ-sī).
- The House of Zheng in Taiwan (Chinese: 台灣鄭氏; Pe̍h-ōe-jī: Tâi-oân Tēⁿ-sī)
- The Family of Koxinga (Chinese: 鄭成功家族; Pe̍h-ōe-jī: Tēⁿ Sêng-kong Ka-cho̍k)

== Overview ==
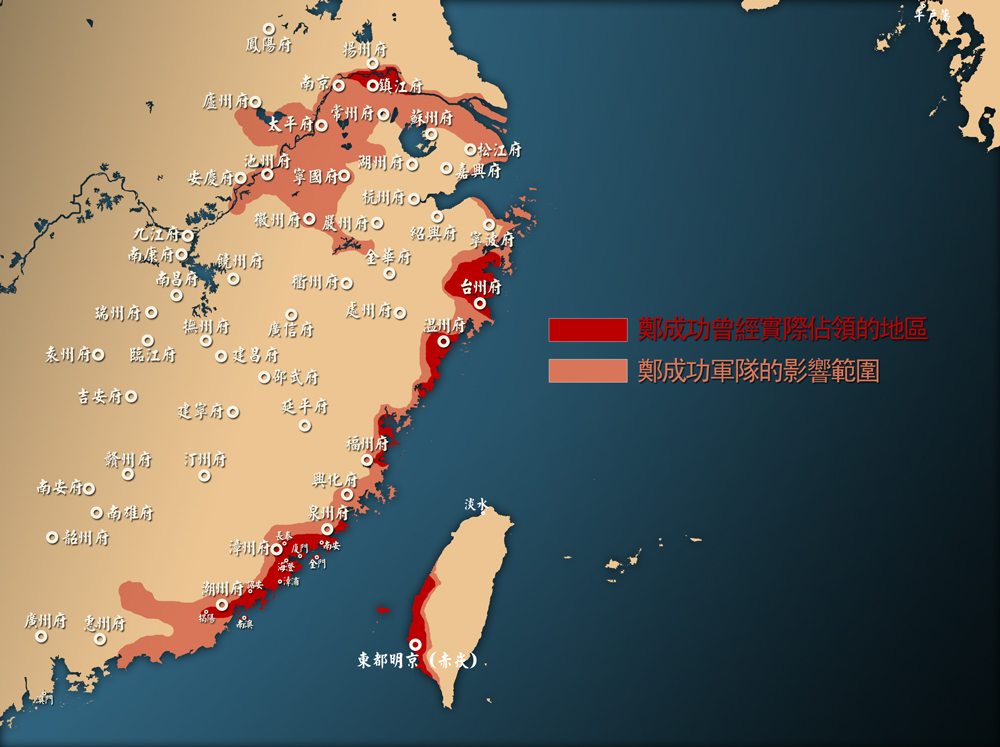
Territories of the House of Koxinga at their largest extent

Following the Qing conquest of the Kingdom of Tungning in 1683, the territory's last ruler, Zheng Keshuang, Prince of Yanping and grandson of Koxinga, was taken to Beijing. The Kangxi Emperor granted Zheng the peerage title of Duke Hanjun and inducted him and his descendants into the Plain Red Banner. The family remained in Beijing until 1911, when the Xinhai Revolution broke out, leading to the fall of the Qing dynasty. Afterward, they moved back to Anhai and Nan'an in southern Fujian, where they reside to this day.

Koxinga's other descendants held the hereditary title of "Sia." They are found both on mainland China and in Taiwan, while the descendants of Koxinga's brother, Shichizaemon, reside in Japan.

His descendants through one of his sons, Zheng Kuan, live in Taiwan. One of Koxinga's descendants on mainland China, Zheng Xiaoxuan (鄭曉嵐), the father of Cheng Chou-yu, fought against the Japanese during the Second Sino-Japanese War. Cheng Chou-yu, born in Shandong, mainland China, referred to himself as a "child of the resistance" against Japan. During the war, he became a refugee, moving across China to escape the Japanese forces.

In 1949, he relocated to Taiwan and focused on fostering stronger ties between Taiwan and mainland China. Although Zheng Chouyu was born in mainland China and identified as Chinese, he felt alienated when he was forced to move to Taiwan in 1949. Taiwan, which had previously been under Japanese rule, felt strange and foreign to him.

== Rulers of the Kingdom of Tungning ==
The House of Koxinga produced five rulers of the Kingdom of Tungning: three reigning monarchs and two regents.

No.	Portrait	Name (Birth–Death)	Title(s)	Reign (Lunar calendar)	
1		Zheng Chenggong (Koxinga) 鄭成功; Zhèng Chénggōng (1624–1662)	Prince of Yanping (延平王); Prince Wu of Chao (潮武王)	14 June 1661; Yongli 15-5-18	23 June 1662; Yongli 16-5-8
2		Zheng Xi 鄭襲; Zhèng Xí (1625–?)	Protector (護理)	23 June 1662; Yongli 16-5-8	30 November 1662; Yongli 17
3		Zheng Jing 鄭經; Zhèng Jīng (1642–1681)	Prince of Yanping (延平王); Prince Wen of Chao (潮文王)	30 November 1662; Yongli 17	17 March 1681; Yongli 35-1-28
4		Zheng Kezang 鄭克𡒉; Zhèng Kèzāng (1662–1681)	Prince Regent (監國)	17 March 1681; Yongli 35-1-28	19 March 1681; Yongli 35
5		Zheng Keshuang 鄭克塽; Zhèng Kèshuǎng (1670–1707)	Prince of Yanping (延平王); Duke Hanjun (漢軍公)	19 March 1681; Yongli 35	5 September 1683; Yongli 37-8-13

== Genealogy ==
Adoption
Zheng Zhilong
Prince of Yanping
Zheng Chenggong (KOXINGA)	Tagawa Shichizaemon	Zheng Du	Zheng En	Zheng Yin	Zheng Xi	Zheng Mo
Zheng Jing	Zheng Cong	Zheng Ming	Zheng Rui	Zheng Zhi	Zheng Kuan	Zheng Yu	Zheng Wen	Zheng Rou	Zheng Fa	Zheng Gang	Zheng Shou	Zheng Wei	Zheng Fu	Zheng Yan	Zheng Zuanwu	Zheng Zuanwei
Niru
Zheng Kezang	Zheng Keshuang	Zheng Kexue	Zheng Kejun	Zheng Keba	Zheng Kemu	Zheng Keqi	Zheng Keqiao	Zheng Ketan	Zheng Kezhang	Zheng Kepei	Zheng Kechong	Zheng Kezhuang	Zheng Bingmo	Zheng Kegui	Zheng Bingcheng	Zheng Bingxun	Zheng Kexi	Zheng Wen	Zheng Bao	Zheng Yu	Zheng Kun	Zheng Ji	Zheng Zhong
Zheng Anfu	Zheng Anlu	Zheng Ankang	Zheng Anji	Zheng Andian	Zheng Ande	Zheng Yan	Zheng Yi	Zheng Qi	Zheng Anxi	Zheng Anqing	Zheng Anxiang	Zheng Anguo	Zheng Anrong	Zheng Anhua	Xialing	Bailing	Shunling	Yongling	Changling	Qingling
Zheng Shijun	Zheng Xianji	Zheng Xiansheng	Zheng Fu	Zheng Beng	Zheng Ai	Zheng Xian	Zheng Pin	Zheng Weng	Zheng Ming	Zheng Rui	Zheng Xing	Zheng Sheng	Zheng Jia	Zheng Guan	Zheng Pin	Zheng Qi	Zheng Tu	Zheng Dian	Zheng Lin	Zheng Qi
Zheng Bin	Zheng Min	Zheng Chang	Zheng Jin	Zheng Gui	Zheng Song	Zheng Bo	Zheng Ji	Zheng Bangxun	Zheng Bangrui	Zheng Bangning	Zheng Wenkui	Zheng Wenbi	Zheng Wen'ying	Zheng Wenfang	Zheng Wenguang	Zheng Wenzhong	Zheng Wenquan	Zheng Wen'wu	Zheng Wenlian	Zheng Wenmin	Zheng Wenhan
Zheng Jizong	Zheng Chengzong	Zheng Cheng'en	Zheng Cheng'yao	Zheng Chenggang	Zheng Chengxu	Liubu	Qinglu	Qingfu	Qing'yu	Qingxiang	Shuangding	Qingpu	Qingmao	Yingpu	Shanpu	Qingxi
Ruishan	Tushan	Deshan	Rongshan	Deyin	Deyu	Songhai	Deshou	Chang'en	Shi'en	Fu'en	Songtai
Yufang	Yuhai	Yuchen	Enrong	Enfu	Enlu	Enhou	Enbao	Enlian	Xingsheng	Yulin	Yucheng	Yushan	Yufu	Yuhai	Yusheng	Yuliang	Runquan
Zheng Yi	Zheng Ze	Chongxu	Erkang
Zheng Jichang	Shuzeng	Shuyue	Shuwang

== See also ==
- Kingdom of Tungning
- Sia (title)
