= Queen Dong =

Dong You
- Princess consort of Yanping
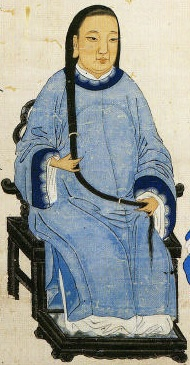
- Born: 17 October 1623; Jinjiang, Fujian, China
- Died: 30 July 1681 (aged 57); Tainan, Taiwan
- Burial: Wudingli, Zhouziwei; Nan'an, Fujian (after 1683)
- Spouse: Koxinga
- Issue: Zheng Jing; Zheng Cong
- House: Koxinga
- Father: Dong Yangxian
- Mother: Lady Chen

Dong You
- Traditional Chinese: 董友
Transcriptions
Southern Min
- Hokkien POJ: Táng Iú

Chao Wu-wang-fei
- Traditional Chinese: 潮武王妃
Transcriptions
Southern Min
- Hokkien POJ: Tiô Bú-ông-hui

Queen Dong (17 October 1623 – 30 July 1681), birth name Dong You, posthumous name Princess Consort Chaowu, was the wife of Koxinga and mother of Zheng Jing.

== Biography ==
In 1623, Dong was born in a Jinjiang family with scholar-official, and her father was Dong Yangxian, a politician of Southern Ming. In 1642, Dong married Koxinga and gave birth to Zheng Jing. In 1649, Koxinga became Prince of Yanping (延平王); as the result, Dong became his princess consort. In 1662, Koxinga defeated Frederick Coyett and his army in the Siege of Fort Zeelandia, and Kingdom of Tungning was later built. After Koxinga died, Dong's son Zheng Jing won the succession to the throne of Tungning by defeating Zheng Xi in a civil war and Zheng Tai in a political struggle. In 1681, Dong died in Tainan, Taiwan.

== Family ==
=== Royal of Tungning ===
Adoption
Zheng Zhilong
Prince of Yanping
Zheng Chenggong (KOXINGA)	Tagawa Shichizaemon	Zheng Du	Zheng En	Zheng Yin	Zheng Xi	Zheng Mo
Zheng Jing	Zheng Cong	Zheng Ming	Zheng Rui	Zheng Zhi	Zheng Kuan	Zheng Yu	Zheng Wen	Zheng Rou	Zheng Fa	Zheng Gang	Zheng Shou	Zheng Wei	Zheng Fu	Zheng Yan	Zheng Zuanwu	Zheng Zuanwei
Niru
Zheng Kezang	Zheng Keshuang	Zheng Kexue	Zheng Kejun	Zheng Keba	Zheng Kemu	Zheng Keqi	Zheng Keqiao	Zheng Ketan	Zheng Kezhang	Zheng Kepei	Zheng Kechong	Zheng Kezhuang	Zheng Bingmo	Zheng Kegui	Zheng Bingcheng	Zheng Bingxun	Zheng Kexi	Zheng Wen	Zheng Bao	Zheng Yu	Zheng Kun	Zheng Ji	Zheng Zhong
Zheng Anfu	Zheng Anlu	Zheng Ankang	Zheng Anji	Zheng Andian	Zheng Ande	Zheng Yan	Zheng Yi	Zheng Qi	Zheng Anxi	Zheng Anqing	Zheng Anxiang	Zheng Anguo	Zheng Anrong	Zheng Anhua	Xialing	Bailing	Shunling	Yongling	Changling	Qingling
Zheng Shijun	Zheng Xianji	Zheng Xiansheng	Zheng Fu	Zheng Beng	Zheng Ai	Zheng Xian	Zheng Pin	Zheng Weng	Zheng Ming	Zheng Rui	Zheng Xing	Zheng Sheng	Zheng Jia	Zheng Guan	Zheng Pin	Zheng Qi	Zheng Tu	Zheng Dian	Zheng Lin	Zheng Qi
Zheng Bin	Zheng Min	Zheng Chang	Zheng Jin	Zheng Gui	Zheng Song	Zheng Bo	Zheng Ji	Zheng Bangxun	Zheng Bangrui	Zheng Bangning	Zheng Wenkui	Zheng Wenbi	Zheng Wen'ying	Zheng Wenfang	Zheng Wenguang	Zheng Wenzhong	Zheng Wenquan	Zheng Wen'wu	Zheng Wenlian	Zheng Wenmin	Zheng Wenhan
Zheng Jizong	Zheng Chengzong	Zheng Cheng'en	Zheng Cheng'yao	Zheng Chenggang	Zheng Chengxu	Liubu	Qinglu	Qingfu	Qing'yu	Qingxiang	Shuangding	Qingpu	Qingmao	Yingpu	Shanpu	Qingxi
Ruishan	Tushan	Deshan	Rongshan	Deyin	Deyu	Songhai	Deshou	Chang'en	Shi'en	Fu'en	Songtai
Yufang	Yuhai	Yuchen	Enrong	Enfu	Enlu	Enhou	Enbao	Enlian	Xingsheng	Yulin	Yucheng	Yushan	Yufu	Yuhai	Yusheng	Yuliang	Runquan
Zheng Yi	Zheng Ze	Chongxu	Erkang
Zheng Jichang	Shuzeng	Shuyue	Shuwang

=== Dong's descendants ===
1. Zheng Jing (鄭經; Prince Wen of Chao & Prince of Yanping)
  1. Zheng Kezang (鄭克𡒉; Crown prince of Yanping & regency)
  2. Zheng Keshuang (鄭克塽; Prince of Chao & Prince of Yanping)
2. Zheng Cong (鄭聰; prince)
3. Zheng Ming (鄭明; prince)
4. Zheng Rui (鄭睿; prince)
5. Zheng Zhi (鄭智; prince)

=== Dong's family ===
- Dong Ciqiao (董次橋; grandfather)
  - Dong Yangbin (董颺賓; uncle)
  - Dong Yangxian (董颺先; father)
    - Dong Yin (董寅; brother)
    - Dong Lin (董麟; brother)
    - Dong Kui (董葵; brother)
    - Dong Ju (董車; brother)
    - Dong Wu (董武; brother)
    - Dong Yin (董隱; sister)
    - Dong Zhou (董周; sister)
    - Dong Qian (董仟; sister)
  - Dong Yangyu (董颺瑜; uncle)
