= Zheng Keshuang =

Duke of Hanjun and Last King of Tungning

- Duke of Hanjun
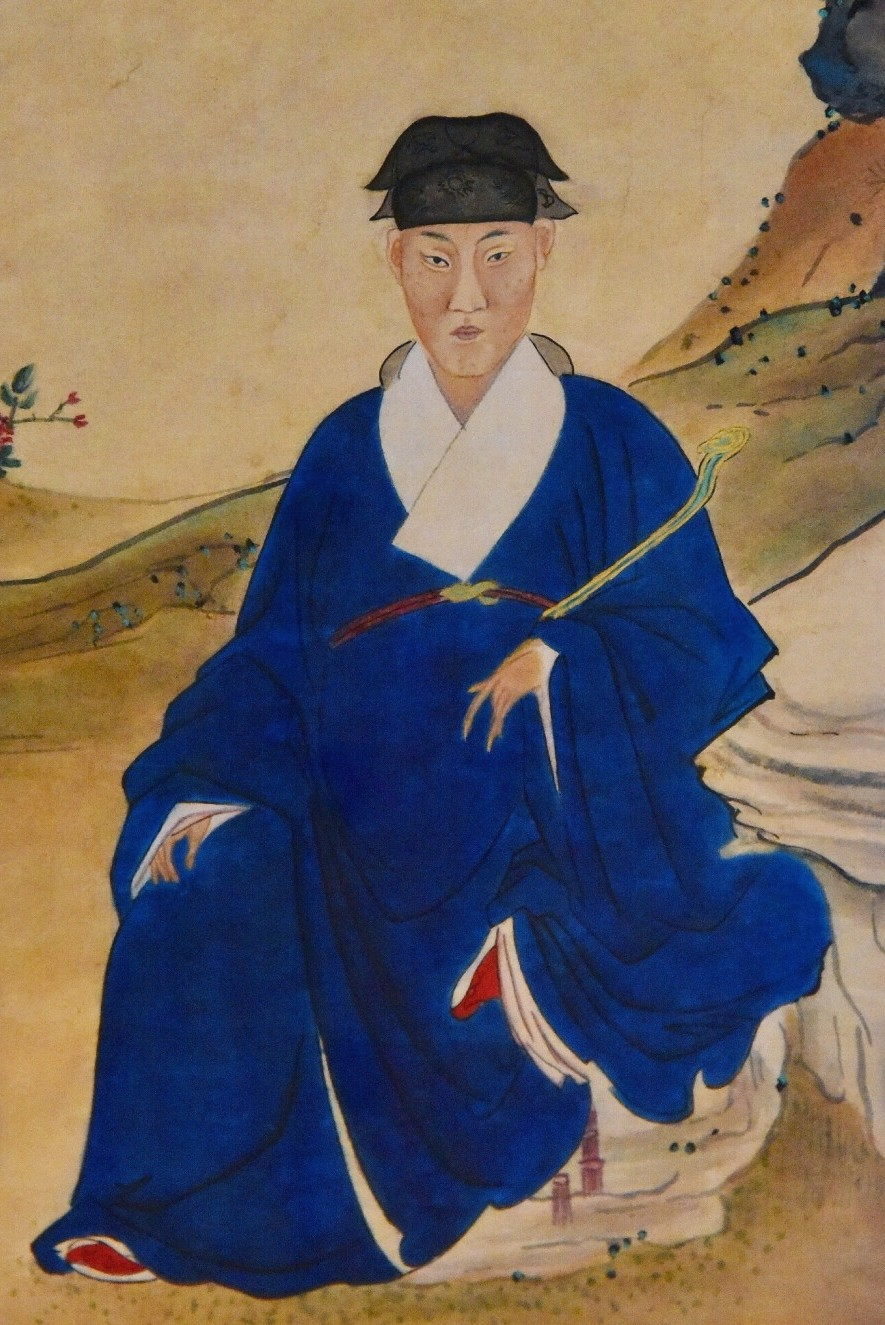
- Portrait by a Qing artist, 17th century

Prince of Yanping
- Reign: 20 March 1681 – 8 October 1683
- Predecessor: Zheng Kezang (as regent)
- Successor: None
- Born: 13 August 1670; Chengtian Prefecture, Kingdom of Tungning
- Died: 22 September 1707 (aged 37); Beijing, Zhili Province, Qing dynasty
- Spouse: Lady Feng
- Issue: Zheng Anfu (鄭安福); Zheng Anlu (鄭安祿); Zheng Ankang (鄭安康)
Era dates
- Adopted the era name of the Southern Ming dynasty: Yongli (永曆): March 1681 – 5 September 1683
- House: Koxinga
- Father: Zheng Jing
- Mother: Lady Huang

Chinese name
- Traditional Chinese: 鄭克塽
- Simplified Chinese: 郑克塽
Transcriptions
Standard Mandarin
- Hanyu Pinyin: Zhèng Kèshuǎng
- Wade–Giles: Cheng K'e-shuang
Southern Min
- Hokkien POJ: Tēⁿ Khek-sóng

Shihong (courtesy name)
- Traditional Chinese: 實弘
- Simplified Chinese: 实弘
Transcriptions
Standard Mandarin
- Hanyu Pinyin: Shíhóng
- Wade–Giles: Shih-hung
Southern Min
- Hokkien POJ: Si̍t-hông

Huitang (art name)
- Chinese: 晦堂
Transcriptions
Standard Mandarin
- Hanyu Pinyin: Huìtáng
- Wade–Giles: Hui-t'ang
Southern Min
- Hokkien POJ: Hòe-tông

Zheng Keshuang, Prince of Yanping (Chinese: 鄭克塽; Pe̍h-ōe-jī: Tēⁿ Khek-sióng; 13 August 1670 – 22 September 1707), courtesy name Shihong, art name Huitang, was the third and last ruler of the Kingdom of Tungning in Taiwan in the 17th century. He was the second son of Zheng Jing and a grandson of Koxinga (Zheng Chenggong). After surrendering to the Qing dynasty in 1683, he was ennobled as Duke of Hanjun (漢軍公), and lived the rest of his life in Beijing.

== Biography ==
Zheng Keshuang was born in Chengtian Prefecture of the Kingdom of Tungning in Taiwan; the administrative centre of Chengtian Prefecture was at Fort Provintia. His father was Zheng Jing, the king of Tungning and the eldest son of Koxinga (Zheng Chenggong), the founder of Tungning. His biological mother was Lady Huang (黃氏), Zheng Jing's concubine.

When Zheng Jing was leading a campaign against the Manchu-led Qing dynasty in China in the late 1670s, he designated his elder son, Zheng Kezang, as his heir apparent and put him in charge of Tungning's internal affairs. At the same time, he also arranged marriages between his two sons and the daughters of two of his most trusted officials: Zheng Kezang married the daughter of Chen Yonghua, while Zheng Keshuang married the daughter of Feng Xifan.

Zheng Jing returned to Tungning in 1680 from a failed campaign against the Qing Empire. In the same year, Chen Yonghua died after he was ousted from the political arena by his rivals, Feng Xifan and Liu Guoxuan (劉國軒). Zheng Jing died a year later in Chengtian Prefecture. After Zheng Jing's death, Feng Xifan allied with Liu Guoxuan, Zheng Cong (鄭聰) and others to slander Zheng Kezang in front of Queen Dowager Dong, Zheng Jing's mother. They claimed that Zheng Kezang was not Zheng Jing's biological son, and launched a coup to kill Zheng Kezang and seize power. Following the coup, a 12-year-old Zheng Keshuang was installed on the throne as the ruler of Tungning under the title "Prince of Yanping" (延平王). After his accession to the throne, Zheng Keshuang rewarded the officials who supported him in the coup by granting them nobility titles. He also gave posthumous honorary titles to his ancestors.

In 1683, the Kangxi Emperor of the Qing dynasty ordered Shi Lang to lead a naval fleet to attack and conquer Tungning. Shi Lang and his fleet defeated the Tungning forces, led by Liu Guoxuan, at the Battle of Penghu. After the battle, the Tungning royal court split into two factions, with one advocating war and the other advocating surrender. The "war" faction was led by Zheng Dexiao (鄭得瀟), Huang Liangji (黃良驥), Xiao Wu (蕭武) and Hong Gongzhu (洪拱柱), while the "surrender" faction was led by Feng Xifan and Liu Guoxuan. Zheng Keshuang heeded Feng and Liu's advice. On 5 July 1683, Feng Xifan ordered Zheng Dexiao to write a surrender document to the Qing Empire. About ten days later, Feng sent Zheng Keshuang to meet Shi Lang. On 13 August, Shi Lang entered Taiwan and received the official surrender, the Ming Dynasty Zheng family perished.

Noble titles were given to the dynasts and officers of the formerly reigning House of Koxinga. Zheng Keshuang and his family were taken to the Qing imperial capital, Beijing, to meet the Kangxi Emperor. The emperor made Zheng Keshuang a member of the Plain Yellow Banner and awarded him the hereditary title Duke of Hanjun (漢軍公; lit. "the duke of Han Eight Banners"). Some former Tungning military units, such as the rattan shield troops, were inducted into the Qing military and deployed in the battle against Russian Cossacks at Albazin.

Zheng Keshuang died of illness in 1707 in Beijing at the age of 37. His younger brother, Zheng Kexue (鄭克壆), was ordered by the Qing government to bury the remains of Zheng Chenggong and Zheng Jing in Quanzhou, Fujian – the ancestral home of the House of Koxinga. Zheng Keshuang's mother, Lady Huang, tried to seek assistance from the Qing government to return their family property in Fujian to them, which was annexed by local officials, but she failed. Later, during the reign of Yongzheng Emperor, the remaining family of Zheng's was reassigned to Plain Red Banner.

== Descendants ==
Adoption
Zheng Zhilong
Prince of Yanping
Zheng Chenggong (KOXINGA)	Tagawa Shichizaemon	Zheng Du	Zheng En	Zheng Yin	Zheng Xi	Zheng Mo
Zheng Jing	Zheng Cong	Zheng Ming	Zheng Rui	Zheng Zhi	Zheng Kuan	Zheng Yu	Zheng Wen	Zheng Rou	Zheng Fa	Zheng Gang	Zheng Shou	Zheng Wei	Zheng Fu	Zheng Yan	Zheng Zuanwu	Zheng Zuanwei
Niru
Zheng Kezang	Zheng Keshuang	Zheng Kexue	Zheng Kejun	Zheng Keba	Zheng Kemu	Zheng Keqi	Zheng Keqiao	Zheng Ketan	Zheng Kezhang	Zheng Kepei	Zheng Kechong	Zheng Kezhuang	Zheng Bingmo	Zheng Kegui	Zheng Bingcheng	Zheng Bingxun	Zheng Kexi	Zheng Wen	Zheng Bao	Zheng Yu	Zheng Kun	Zheng Ji	Zheng Zhong
Zheng Anfu	Zheng Anlu	Zheng Ankang	Zheng Anji	Zheng Andian	Zheng Ande	Zheng Yan	Zheng Yi	Zheng Qi	Zheng Anxi	Zheng Anqing	Zheng Anxiang	Zheng Anguo	Zheng Anrong	Zheng Anhua	Xialing	Bailing	Shunling	Yongling	Changling	Qingling
Zheng Shijun	Zheng Xianji	Zheng Xiansheng	Zheng Fu	Zheng Beng	Zheng Ai	Zheng Xian	Zheng Pin	Zheng Weng	Zheng Ming	Zheng Rui	Zheng Xing	Zheng Sheng	Zheng Jia	Zheng Guan	Zheng Pin	Zheng Qi	Zheng Tu	Zheng Dian	Zheng Lin	Zheng Qi
Zheng Bin	Zheng Min	Zheng Chang	Zheng Jin	Zheng Gui	Zheng Song	Zheng Bo	Zheng Ji	Zheng Bangxun	Zheng Bangrui	Zheng Bangning	Zheng Wenkui	Zheng Wenbi	Zheng Wen'ying	Zheng Wenfang	Zheng Wenguang	Zheng Wenzhong	Zheng Wenquan	Zheng Wen'wu	Zheng Wenlian	Zheng Wenmin	Zheng Wenhan
Zheng Jizong	Zheng Chengzong	Zheng Cheng'en	Zheng Cheng'yao	Zheng Chenggang	Zheng Chengxu	Liubu	Qinglu	Qingfu	Qing'yu	Qingxiang	Shuangding	Qingpu	Qingmao	Yingpu	Shanpu	Qingxi
Ruishan	Tushan	Deshan	Rongshan	Deyin	Deyu	Songhai	Deshou	Chang'en	Shi'en	Fu'en	Songtai
Yufang	Yuhai	Yuchen	Enrong	Enfu	Enlu	Enhou	Enbao	Enlian	Xingsheng	Yulin	Yucheng	Yushan	Yufu	Yuhai	Yusheng	Yuliang	Runquan
Zheng Yi	Zheng Ze	Chongxu	Erkang
Zheng Jichang	Shuzeng	Shuyue	Shuwang

Zheng Keshuang was survived by three sons: Zheng Anfu (鄭安福), Zheng Anlu (鄭安祿), and Zheng Ankang (鄭安康). However, all his sons died without issue; and so, Zheng Xianji (鄭咸吉), a first cousin once removed of them, was appointed as heir to Zheng Anfu. Zheng Xianji was the elder son of Zheng Ande (鄭安德) and a grandson of Zheng Keqiao (鄭克塙), and the latter was the youngest brother of Zheng Keshuang.

Zheng's descendants served as Bannermen in Beijing until 1911 when the Xinhai Revolution broke out and the Qing dynasty's fell, after which they moved back to Anhai and Nan'an in southern Fujian. They still live there to this day.

Poet Cheng Chou-yu claimed to be one of Zheng's descendants, was born in Shandong province in China. Zheng Xiaoxuan (鄭曉嵐), father of Zheng Chouyu, fought against the Japanese invaders in the Second Sino-Japanese War. Zheng Chouyu was born in Shandong in mainland China and called himself a "child of the resistance" against Japan and he became a refugee during the war, moving from place to place across China to avoid the Japanese. He moved to Taiwan in 1949 and focuses his work on building stronger ties between Taiwan and mainland China. Zheng Chouyu was born in mainland China, he identified as Chinese and he felt alienated after he was forced to move to Taiwan in 1949 which was previously under Japanese rule and felt strange and foreign to him.

== In fiction ==
Zheng Keshuang appears as one of the antagonists in the novel The Deer and the Cauldron by Louis Cha.

== See also ==
- Kingdom of Tungning
- History of Taiwan
- Shi Lang

== Bibliography ==
- Alber, Charles J. (2004). Embracing the Lie: Ding Ling and the Politics of Literature in the People's Republic of China. Greenwood Publishing Group. pp. 215–. ISBN 978-0-275-97236-3.
- Au, Chung-To (2008a). Modernist Aesthetics in Taiwanese Poetry Since The 1950s. BRILL. pp. 61–. ISBN 978-90-04-16707-0.
- Au, Chung-To (2008b). Modernist Aesthetics in Taiwanese Poetry Since The 1950s. BRILL. pp. 154–. ISBN 978-90-04-16707-0.
- Braga, Dominique; Cassou, Jean; Guéhenno, Jean; Bazalgette, Léon; Colin, Paul; Arcos, René, eds. (2004). Europe: revue littéraire mensuelle (in French). Les Éditions Denoël. p. 356.
- Cha, Louis; Jin, Yong (27 March 2003). The deer and the cauldron: a martial arts novel. Oxford University Press. p. 128. ISBN 978-0-19-590327-0.
- Chi, Pang-Yuan; Wang, David Der-wei (22 September 2000a). Chinese Literature in the Second Half of a Modern Century: A Critical Survey. Indiana University Press. pp. 19–. ISBN 0-253-10836-5.
- Chi, Pang-Yuan; Wang, David Der-wei (22 September 2000b). Chinese Literature in the Second Half of a Modern Century: A Critical Survey. Indiana University Press. pp. 19–. ISBN 0-253-10836-5.
- "Chung-kuo Hsien Tai Wen Hsüeh". Modern Chinese Literature. Vol. 7–8. San Francisco State University Center for the Study of Modern Chinese Literature. 1993. p. 56.
- Clements, Jonathan (24 October 2011). Coxinga and the Fall of the Ming Dynasty. History Press. ISBN 978-0-7524-7382-6.
- Davidson, James W. (1903). The Island of Formosa, Past and Present: history, people, resources, and commercial prospects: tea, camphor, sugar, gold, coal, sulphur, economical plants, and other productions. London and New York: Macmillan & co. OL 6931635M – via Internet Archive.
- Hang, Xing (5 January 2016). Conflict and Commerce in Maritime East Asia: The Zheng Family and the Shaping of the Modern World, c.1620–1720. Cambridge University Press. pp. 239–. ISBN 978-1-316-45384-1.
- Hung, Chien-chao (1981). Taiwan Under the Cheng Family, 1662–1683: Sinicization After Dutch Rule (Ph.D. dissertation). Georgetown University. OCLC 63232462.
- Idema, Wilt L.; Haft, Lloyd (1997). A Guide to Chinese Literature. University of Michigan Press. pp. 374–. ISBN 978-0-89264-123-9.
- Kruger, Rayne (30 December 2003). All Under Heaven: A Complete History of China. Wiley. ISBN 978-0-470-86533-0 – via Internet Archive. "Zheng Chouyu koxinga."
- Lau, Joseph S. M.; Goldblatt, Howard (2007). The Columbia Anthology of Modern Chinese Literature. Columbia University Press. pp. 43–. ISBN 978-0-231-13841-3.
- Lupke, C. (25 December 2007a). New Perspectives on Contemporary Chinese Poetry. Palgrave Macmillan US. pp. 3–. ISBN 978-0-230-61014-9.
- Lupke, C. (25 December 2007b). New Perspectives on Contemporary Chinese Poetry. Palgrave Macmillan US. pp. 28–. ISBN 978-0-230-61014-9.
- Manthorpe, Jonathan (2008). Forbidden Nation: A History of Taiwan. New York City: St. Martin's Press. p. 108. ISBN 978-0-230-61424-6.
- Mostow, Joshua S.; Denton, Kirk A.; Fulton, Bruce (2003). The Columbia Companion to Modern East Asian Literature. Columbia University Press. pp. 566–. ISBN 978-0-231-11314-4.
- Renditions: Issues 31–32. Research Centre for Translation, Chinese University of Hong Kong. 1989. p. 20.
- Shih, Shu-mei (25 December 2012). Sinophone Studies: A Critical Reader. Columbia University Press. pp. 426–. ISBN 978-0-231-52710-1.
- Spence, Jonathan D. (1991). The Search for Modern China. Norton. pp. 56–. ISBN 978-0-393-30780-1.
- Thornber, Karen (2 March 2012a). Ecoambiguity: Environmental Crises and East Asian Literatures. University of Michigan Press. pp. 642–. ISBN 978-0-472-11806-9.
- Thornber, Karen (2 March 2012b). Ecoambiguity: Environmental Crises and East Asian Literatures. University of Michigan Press. pp. 642–. ISBN 978-0-472-11806-9.
- Wang, Dewei; Wang, David Der-wei; Rojas, Carlos (24 January 2007). Writing Taiwan: A New Literary History. Duke University Press. pp. 392–. ISBN 978-0-8223-3867-3.
- Wang, Phyllis T.; Chiu, Cathy (1997). Ying yi Zhong wen xin shi suo yin 1917–1995. Hanxue Yanjiu Zhongxin. p. 324. ISBN 978-957-678-225-1.
- Ying, Li-hua (22 December 2009a). Historical Dictionary of Modern Chinese Literature. Scarecrow Press. pp. 277–. ISBN 978-0-8108-7081-9.
- Ying, Li-hua (22 December 2009b). Historical Dictionary of Modern Chinese Literature. Scarecrow Press. pp. 397–. ISBN 978-0-8108-7081-9.
- Ying, Li-hua (1 April 2010a). The A to Z of Modern Chinese Literature. Scarecrow Press. pp. 277–. ISBN 978-1-4617-3187-0.
- Ying, Li-hua (1 April 2010b). The A to Z of Modern Chinese Literature. Scarecrow Press. pp. 397–. ISBN 978-1-4617-3187-0.
- Zheng, Chouyu (1979). Zheng Chouyu shi ji.
- 盧正恆 (2016). "旗與民：清代鄭氏家族與泉州鄭氏宗族初探". 季風亞洲研究. 2 (1): 115–151.
- "詩人鄭愁予：我是個抗戰兒童". 中國新聞網. 16 July 2015. Archived from the original on 15 May 2018.
- 豪, 林 (1 April 2018). 東瀛紀事—戴潮春事件. 南港山文史工作室.
- 鄭喜夫 (1990). "鄭延平之世系與井江鄭氏人物雜述". 臺灣文獻季刊. 43 (3): 243–245.

Zheng Keshuang House of Koxinga Born: 13 August 1670 Died: 22 September 1707
Regnal titles
Preceded by Zheng Jing	Prince of Yanping; 20 March 1681 – 8 October 1683	Surrendered to the Qing dynasty, and the office was abolished
Political offices
Preceded by Zheng Kezang	Ruler of the Kingdom of Tungning; 20 March 1681 – 8 October 1683	Succeeded by Zhou Chang (as Taiwan-Xiamen Circuit Commissioner)
