= Zheng Jing =

Second King of Tungning (1642–1681)

Zheng Jing 鄭經
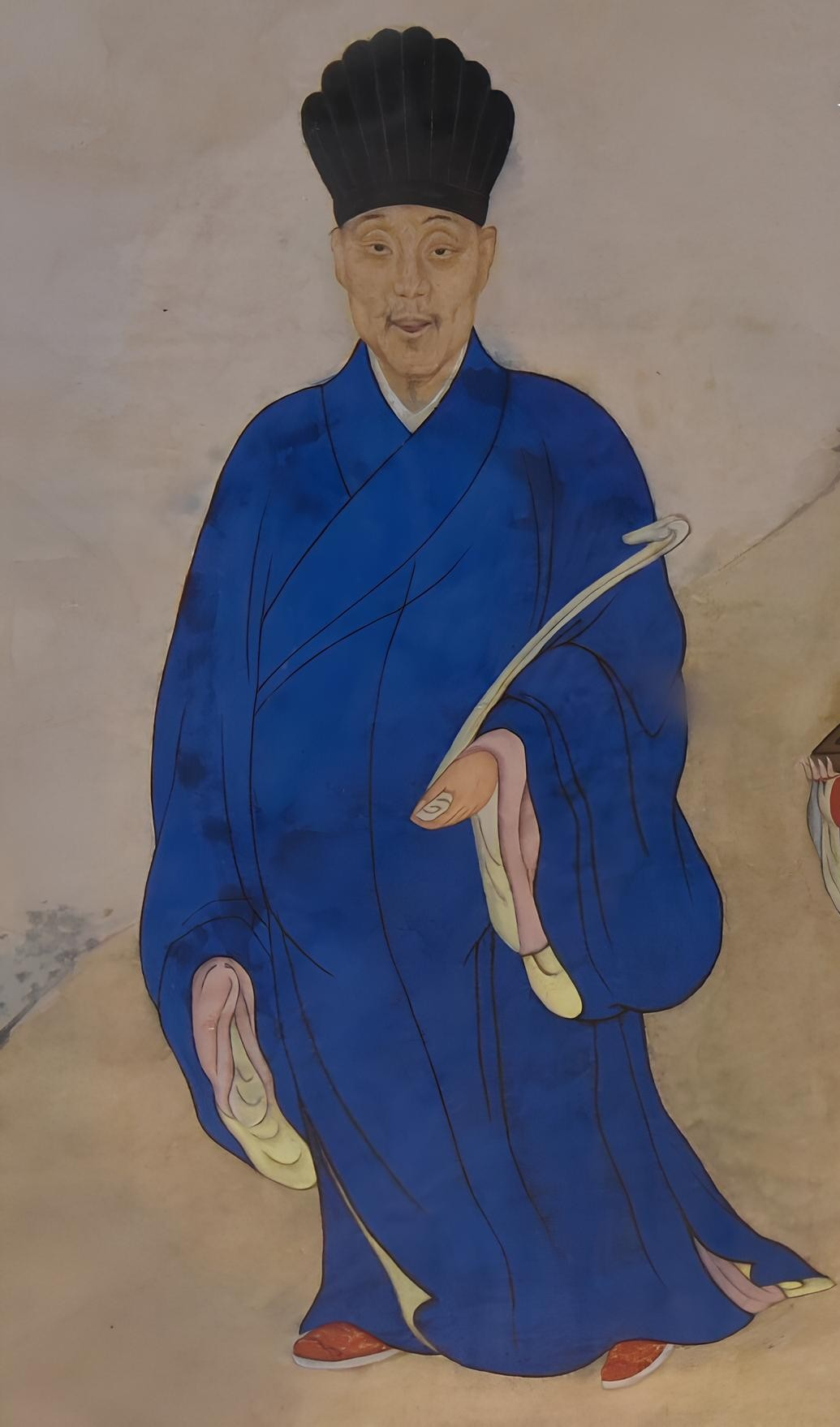
- Portrait by a Qing artist, 17th century

Prince of Yanping
- Reign: 29 June 1662 – 17 March 1681
- Predecessor: Koxinga
- Successor: Zheng Kezang (as regent)
- Born: 25 October 1642; Fujian, Ming dynasty
- Died: 17 March 1681 (aged 38); Chengtian Prefecture, Kingdom of Tungning
- Burial: Tomb of Zheng Chenggong (鄭成功墓; in present-day Nan'an, Quanzhou, Fujian)
- Spouse: Tang, Princess Wen of Chao
- Issue: Zheng Kezang, Zheng Keshuang, six other sons and six daughters
Names
- Zheng Jing (鄭經)
Era dates
- Adopted the era name of the Southern Ming dynasty: Yongli (永曆): November 1662 – 17 March 1681
Posthumous name
- Prince Wen of Chao (潮文王)
- House: Koxinga
- Dynasty: Tungning
- Father: Koxinga, Prince of Yanping
- Mother: Dong You, Princess of Yanping

- Zheng Jing
- Hàn-jī: 鄭經
- Pe̍h-ōe-jī: Tēⁿ Keng
- Tâi-lô: Tēnn King

Pen name
- Hàn-jī: 式天
- Pe̍h-ōe-jī: Sek-thian
- Tâi-lô: Sik-thian

Courtesy name
- Hàn-jī: 賢之 / 元之
- Pe̍h-ōe-jī: Hiân-chi / Goân-chi
- Tâi-lô: Hiân-tsi / Guân-tsi

Zheng Jing, Prince of Yanping (Chinese: 鄭經; Pe̍h-ōe-jī: Tēⁿ Keng; 25 October 1642 – 17 March 1681), courtesy names Xianzhi (Chinese: 賢之; Pe̍h-ōe-jī: Hiân-chi) and Yuanzhi (Chinese: 元之; Pe̍h-ōe-jī: Goân-chi), pseudonym Shitian (Chinese: 式天; Pe̍h-ōe-jī: Sek-thian), was initially a Southern Ming military general who later became the second ruler of the Tungning Kingdom of Taiwan by succeeding his father Koxinga's hereditary title of "Prince of Yanping", reigned as a dynastic monarch of the kingdom from 1662 to 1681.

== Biography ==
Born on 25 October 1642, he was the eldest son of Koxinga (Zheng Chenggong) and a grandson of the pirate-merchant Zheng Zhilong. After the conquest of Fort Zeelandia in 1662 by his father, Zheng Jing controlled the military forces in Amoy and Quemoy on his father's behalf, but the friction between him and his father was later provoked by a domestic dispute, as he secretly had an incestuous relationship with his brother's wet nurse, with whom he had a newborn son (Zheng Kezang), despite having been married. Koxinga was ashamed and resentful by his son's behaviour and ordered Jing's execution, but his order was never implemented due to the opposition by Amoy's forces, and Koxinga's sudden death of malaria in June 1662. Upon the death of his father six months later, Zheng Jing contested throne as the King of Tungning with his uncle, Zheng Shixi. The civil war was end in Zheng Jing's victory after he successfully quelled the hostile forces of his uncle in Taiwan and captured Fort Zeelandia. This was followed by Zheng Shixi withdrawing his claim and his surrender to the Qing dynasty next year.

With both the vast armed merchant fleet and the throne of Tungning, he intended to continue his father's former plan to invade Luzon which was under Spanish rule; however, he was forced to abandon this venture when faced the immediate threat of a Manchu-Dutch alliance. His defeat of a combined Qing-Dutch fleet commanded by Han Banner General Ma Degong in 1664 resulted in ending the brief alliance. Ma Degong was killed in the battle by Zheng's fleet, but the islands of Amoy and Quemoy fell to the Qing forces, forcing him to withdraw all his troops and resources to Taiwan.

The Dutch looted relics and killed monks after attacking a Buddhist complex at Putuoshan on the Zhoushan islands in 1665 during their war against Zheng Jing's fleet.

Zheng Jing's navy executed thirty four Dutch sailors and drowned eight Dutch sailors after looting, ambushing and sinking the Dutch fluyt ship Cuylenburg in 1672 on northeastern Taiwan. Only twenty one Dutch sailors escaped to Japan. The ship was going from Nagasaki to Batavia on a trade mission.

During his 19-year reign, he tried to provide sufficiently for the local inhabitants and reorganized military forces in Taiwan. He frequently exchanged ambassadors with the Kangxi Emperor from the mainland. Although he continued to fight for the cause his father died for, he had largely abandoned any pretense of restoring the Ming dynasty by the time he invaded Fujian in 1676. Zheng's forces land in Siming at the behest of Geng Jingzhong, who had joined the Revolt of the Three Feudatories, following the lead of Wu Sangui. He occupied key cities in the province for a year before losing them back to the Manchus by the end of 1677. Invading Fujian once more, he led a force of 30,000 men to capture Haicheng as well as taking the provincial commander prisoner.

In 1680, Zheng Jing was forced to abandon Amoy, Quemoy and Tang-soaⁿ after losing a major naval battle to Chinese Qing admiral Shi Lang. Driven off China proper by the Manchus, he retreated to modern-day Tainan where he died on 17 March 1681. Zheng named as his successor his oldest son, Zheng Kezang; however, Zheng Kezang was quickly toppled in favor of Zheng Keshuang.

== Family ==
Ming Dynasty Zheng family

Parents

- Father: Zheng Chenggong, Prince of Yanping
- Mother: Dong You, Queen of Tungning

Consorts and issues

- Princess Wen of Chao, of the Tang clan (潮文王妃唐氏)
- Lady Chen, of the Chen clan (陳氏;1626－1662), personal name Zhaoniang (昭娘)
  - Zheng Kezang (鄭克𡒉;1662–1681), Crown Prince of Yanping (延平王世子), first son
- Lady Lin, of the Lin clan (林氏)
- Lady Li, of the Li clan (李氏)
- Lady Lai, of the Lai clan (賴氏)
- Lady Huang, of the Huang clan (黃氏), personal name Heniang (和娘)
  - Zheng Keshuang, Prince of Yanping (鄭克塽; 13 August 1670 – 22 September 1707), second son
- Unknown:
  - Zhang Kebo (鄭克壆), third son
  - 5 sons and 6 daughters

== See also ==
- Kingdom of Tungning
- History of Taiwan
- Zheng Chenggong
- Shi Lang

== Bibliography ==
- Carioti, Patrizia. “The Zhengs' Maritime Power in the International Context of the 17th Century Far East Seas: The Rise of a 'Centralised Piratical Organisation' and Its Gradual Development into an Informal 'State'”. Ming Qing Yanjiu (1996): 29–67.
- Chang Hsiu-jung, Anthony Farrington, Huang Fu-san, Ts'ao Yung-ho, Wu Mi-tsa, Cheng Hsi-fu, and Ang Ka-in. The English Factory in Taiwan, 1670–1685. Taipei: National Taiwan University, 1995.
- Clements, Jonathan. Coxinga and the Fall of the Ming Dynasty. Stroud: Sutton Publishing, 2004. ISBN 9780752473826
- Hung, Chien-chao (1981). Taiwan Under the Cheng Family, 1662–1683: Sinicization After Dutch Rule (Ph.D. dissertation). Georgetown University. OCLC 63232462.
- Keene, Donald Keene. The Battles of Coxinga: Chikamatsu's Puppet Play, Its Background and Importance. London: Taylor's Foreign Press, 1950.
- Manthorpe, Jonathan. Forbidden Nation: a History of Taiwan, New York: Palgrave MacMillan, 2002. ISBN 9780230614246
- Shen Yu. Cheng-shih shih-mo. 1836.
- Wills, Jr., John E. Pepper, Guns and Parleys: The Dutch East India Company and China 1622–1681. Cambridge: Harvard University Press, 1974. ISBN 9780674661813
- Hummel, Arthur W. Sr., ed. (1943). "Chêng Ching" . Eminent Chinese of the Ch'ing Period. United States Government Printing Office.

Zheng Jing House of Koxinga Born: 25 October 1642 Died: 17 March 1681
Regnal titles
Preceded by Koxinga	Prince of Yanping; 29 June 1662 – 17 March 1681	Succeeded by Zheng Keshuang
Political offices
Preceded by Zheng Xi	Ruler of the Kingdom of Tungning; 27 November 1662 – 17 March 1681	Succeeded by Zheng Kezang
