= Zheng Kezang =

Third King of Tungning

- Regent
- Reign: 17 – 19 March 1681
- Predecessor: Zheng Jing (as Prince of Yanping)
- Successor: Zheng Keshuang (as Prince of Yanping)
- Born: 1662; Xiamen, Fujian, Southern Ming dynasty
- Died: 1681 (aged 19); Chengtian Prefecture, Kingdom of Tungning
- Spouse: Princess Chen
Era dates
- Adopted the era name of the Southern Ming dynasty: Yongli (永曆): 1681
- Father: Zheng Jing, Prince Wen of Chao
- Mother: Chen Zhaoniang

Zheng Kezang
- Traditional Chinese: 鄭克𡒉
Transcriptions
Southern Min
- Hokkien POJ: Tēⁿ Khek-chong

Jianguo Shisun
- Traditional Chinese: 監國世孫
Transcriptions
Southern Min
- Hokkien POJ: Kam-kok sè-sun

Qinshe
- Traditional Chinese: 欽舍
Transcriptions
Southern Min
- Hokkien POJ: Khim-sià

Zheng Kezang (1662–1681), birth name Qin (欽) or Qinshe (欽舍), was the crown prince and regency of the Kingdom of Tungning. Kezhang was the eldest son of Zheng Jing and Chen Zhaoniang, and his grandparents were Koxinga and Princess Dong.

== Biography ==
In 1662, Zheng was born in Xiamen; his mother was Chen Zhaoniang, who was one of the concubines of Zheng Jing. In 1679, Zheng became Jianguo Shisun (監國世孫), the crown prince and regency of Tungning.

In 1681, after Zheng Jing died, Kezang was killed by his uncle Zheng Cong in the "Tungning Coup" (東寧之變).

Princess Chen, Zheng's princess consort, committed suicide later. Zheng did not have any children.

== Family ==
Adoption
Zheng Zhilong
Prince of Yanping
Zheng Chenggong (KOXINGA)	Tagawa Shichizaemon	Zheng Du	Zheng En	Zheng Yin	Zheng Xi	Zheng Mo
Zheng Jing	Zheng Cong	Zheng Ming	Zheng Rui	Zheng Zhi	Zheng Kuan	Zheng Yu	Zheng Wen	Zheng Rou	Zheng Fa	Zheng Gang	Zheng Shou	Zheng Wei	Zheng Fu	Zheng Yan	Zheng Zuanwu	Zheng Zuanwei
Niru
Zheng Kezang	Zheng Keshuang	Zheng Kexue	Zheng Kejun	Zheng Keba	Zheng Kemu	Zheng Keqi	Zheng Keqiao	Zheng Ketan	Zheng Kezhang	Zheng Kepei	Zheng Kechong	Zheng Kezhuang	Zheng Bingmo	Zheng Kegui	Zheng Bingcheng	Zheng Bingxun	Zheng Kexi	Zheng Wen	Zheng Bao	Zheng Yu	Zheng Kun	Zheng Ji	Zheng Zhong
Zheng Anfu	Zheng Anlu	Zheng Ankang	Zheng Anji	Zheng Andian	Zheng Ande	Zheng Yan	Zheng Yi	Zheng Qi	Zheng Anxi	Zheng Anqing	Zheng Anxiang	Zheng Anguo	Zheng Anrong	Zheng Anhua	Xialing	Bailing	Shunling	Yongling	Changling	Qingling
Zheng Shijun	Zheng Xianji	Zheng Xiansheng	Zheng Fu	Zheng Beng	Zheng Ai	Zheng Xian	Zheng Pin	Zheng Weng	Zheng Ming	Zheng Rui	Zheng Xing	Zheng Sheng	Zheng Jia	Zheng Guan	Zheng Pin	Zheng Qi	Zheng Tu	Zheng Dian	Zheng Lin	Zheng Qi
Zheng Bin	Zheng Min	Zheng Chang	Zheng Jin	Zheng Gui	Zheng Song	Zheng Bo	Zheng Ji	Zheng Bangxun	Zheng Bangrui	Zheng Bangning	Zheng Wenkui	Zheng Wenbi	Zheng Wen'ying	Zheng Wenfang	Zheng Wenguang	Zheng Wenzhong	Zheng Wenquan	Zheng Wen'wu	Zheng Wenlian	Zheng Wenmin	Zheng Wenhan
Zheng Jizong	Zheng Chengzong	Zheng Cheng'en	Zheng Cheng'yao	Zheng Chenggang	Zheng Chengxu	Liubu	Qinglu	Qingfu	Qing'yu	Qingxiang	Shuangding	Qingpu	Qingmao	Yingpu	Shanpu	Qingxi
Ruishan	Tushan	Deshan	Rongshan	Deyin	Deyu	Songhai	Deshou	Chang'en	Shi'en	Fu'en	Songtai
Yufang	Yuhai	Yuchen	Enrong	Enfu	Enlu	Enhou	Enbao	Enlian	Xingsheng	Yulin	Yucheng	Yushan	Yufu	Yuhai	Yusheng	Yuliang	Runquan
Zheng Yi	Zheng Ze	Chongxu	Erkang
Zheng Jichang	Shuzeng	Shuyue	Shuwang

Siblings:

- Zheng Keshuang (鄭克塽)
- Zheng Kexue (鄭克壆)

Zheng Kezang (regent) House of Zheng Born: 1662 Died: 1681
Political offices
Preceded by Zheng Jing	Ruler of the Kingdom of Tungning; 17– 19 March 1681	Succeeded by Zheng Keshuang
