= Lu Ding Ji (disambiguation) =

Lu Ding Ji may refer to:

- The Deer and the Cauldron, known as Lu Ding Ji in Chinese, is a novel by Jin Yong. An alternate English translation of the title is The Duke of Mount Deer.
- Films adapted from the novel:
  - Royal Tramp, a 1992 Hong Kong film
  - Royal Tramp II, the sequel to Royal Tramp
- Television series adapted from the novel:
  - The Duke of Mount Deer (1984 Hong Kong TV series), a 1984 Hong Kong television series
  - The Duke of Mount Deer (1984 Taiwanese TV series), a 1984 Taiwanese television series
  - The Duke of Mount Deer (1998 TV series), a 1998 Hong Kong television series
  - The Duke of Mount Deer (2000 TV series), a 2000 television series
  - Royal Tramp (TV series), a 2008 Chinese television series
