= List of The Deer and the Cauldron characters =

List of characters from the novel The Deer and the Cauldron by Jin Yong

The following is a list of characters from the novel The Deer and the Cauldron by Jin Yong. Some of these characters previously appeared in another novel Sword Stained with Royal Blood, which is also written by Jin Yong. Some of these characters are based on historical figures, such as the Kangxi Emperor, Oboi, Wu Sangui, Chen Yuanyuan, Princess Changping, Zheng Keshuang, Feng Xifan, Shi Lang, Galdan Boshugtu Khan, Sophia Alekseyevna, Desi Sangye Gyatso, and Wu Liuqi, as well as Zha Jizuo, a purported ancestor of Jin Yong (Zha Liangyong).

== Wei Xiaobao and his family ==
- Wei Xiaobao (韋小寶) is the witty, sly and illiterate protagonist who was born in a brothel in Yangzhou in 17th-century China during the Qing dynasty. He bumbles his way into the imperial palace and has a fateful encounter with the young Kangxi Emperor, with whom he develops a friendship. By sheer luck and wit, he makes a series of accomplishments that have an impact on significant historical events during that era.
- Wei Chunfang (韋春芳) is Wei Xiaobao's mother and a prostitute from a brothel in Yangzhou.

=== The seven wives ===
- Mu Jianping (沐劍屏) is Mu Jiansheng's younger sister and a member of the House of Prince Mu. Due to a conflict between the House of Prince Mu and the Tiandihui, she is taken hostage by the Tiandihui and sent to the imperial palace to be placed under Wei Xiaobao's watch. Later, she is captured by the Mystic Dragon Cult and forced to join them. She is the second youngest and most naïve of the seven.
- Fang Yi (方怡) is Liu Dahong's apprentice and a servant of the House of Prince Mu. She is initially in a romantic relationship with Liu Yizhou, who also serves the House of Prince Mu. After a failed assassination attempt on the Kangxi Emperor, she is wounded and forced to rely on Wei Xiaobao to keep her safe in the imperial palace. Wei Xiaobao then uses every opportunity to make advances on her and force her to promise to marry him if he saves Liu Yizhou, who has been captured by imperial guards. After seeing how committed she is to Liu Yizhou, Wei Xiaobao wavers between giving up on her and insisting that she keeps her promise. However, Fang Yi later ends her relationship with Liu Yizhou after seeing how cowardly he is, and decides she wants to be with Wei Xiaobao after realising that he is more trustworthy despite his flaws. At one point, she is captured by the Mystic Dragon Cult and forced to join them and lure Wei Xiaobao into traps. Wei Xiaobao manages to save her with Su Quan's help.
- Shuang'er (雙兒) is a servant of the Zhuang family of Huzhou and an apprentice of He Tishou. The matriarch tells her to follow Wei Xiaobao and serve him – as an expression of her gratitude to him for avenging their family by killing Oboi – and she initially serves as his bodyguard before becoming one of his wives. Among the seven, she is the youngest and the most loyal. At one point, she becomes sworn siblings with Wu Liuqi.
- Su Quan (蘇荃) is Hong Antong's wife who is adept in using her beautiful looks to seduce men and bend them to her will. As Hong Antong had forced her to marry him, she harbours a grudge against him and has been trying to consolidate power within the cult by promoting younger members to replace the older ones who are more loyal to Hong Antong. As Hong Antong needs to have sex with virgins in order to release excess neigong, he has never consummated his marriage with Su Quan. Wei Xiaobao flatters and flirts with her during his first encounter with the Mystic Dragon Cult. Later, she disguises herself as a prostitute to lure Wei Xiaobao into a trap in a brothel, but he sees through her guise easily as she is unfamiliar with the ways of a brothel. He tricks her into drinking drugged wine, rendering her unconscious, and places her on the bed along with Fang Yi, Mu Jianping, Zeng Rou, Shuang'er and Ake; and randomly has sex with some of them. The next time she and Wei Xiaobao meet, her attitude is warmer, and it is later revealed that she is pregnant with his child. She decides to follow Wei after the Mystic Dragon Cult is destroyed in its internal conflict. She is the most powerful in martial arts and the oldest among the seven.
- Princess Jianning (建寧公主) is a younger sister of the Kangxi Emperor. It turns out later that she is not related to the emperor because her biological mother is Mao Dongzhu, who has been impersonating the empress dowager. Of the seven wives, she is the most violent, sadistic, and spoiled. She loves Wei Xiaobao because he is the only one who dares to stand up to her, and she likes to engage in BDSM activities with him. When the emperor finds out that Jianning is not his real sister, he arranges for Jianning to be sent to Yunnan to marry Wu Yingxiong in a political marriage. Before the wedding, she drugs Wei Xiaobao, strips him naked, whips him, and tries to use candles to burn his hair. He gives in to her seductive advances and sleeps with her that night. The next day, Wei Xiaobao gives her one of the pistols he received from Wu Sangui as a gift. She tricks Wu Yingxiong into going into her room, points the pistol at him, and orders him to strip before castrating him. The marriage still proceeds as planned although Jianning continues to have an ongoing affair with Wei Xiaobao. She eventually reveals that she is pregnant with Wei Xiaobao's child and they elope. The emperor later issues a decree declaring that Jianning is Wei Xiaobao's formal spouse.
- Zeng Rou (曾柔) is from the Wangwu Sect. She attempts to assassinate Wei Xiaobao in a military camp and catches him off guard while he is gambling with some officers. However, Wei Xiaobao turns the gambling game to his advantage and outsmarts her by cheating in the game. He then lets them go and earns Zeng Rou's admiration and affection. Zeng Rou is the most polite and cultured among the seven.
- Ake (阿珂) is the daughter of Chen Yuanyuan and Li Zicheng. She was kidnapped and raised by Jiunan, who trained her to kill Wu Sangui, who is initially believed to be Ake's father. Ake has a crush on Zheng Keshuang previously but leaves him after he reveals his true colours. She is Wei Xiaobao's most beautiful wife.

=== The three children ===
- Shuangshuang (雙雙; "doubles") is Wei Xiaobao's daughter and first child, born to Princess Jianning. She was originally named Bandeng (板凳; "wooden bench").
- Hutou (虎頭; "tiger head") is Wei Xiaobao's first son and second child, born to Ake.
- Tongchui (銅錘; "bronze hammer") is Wei Xiaobao's second son and third child, born to Su Quan.

== Qing Empire ==
- The Kangxi Emperor (康熙皇帝) is the ruler of the Qing Empire. First introduced as Xiaoxuanzi (小玄子), he forges a close friendship with Wei Xiaobao. He is a wise, knowledgeable, and logical ruler.
- The Empress Dowager (太后) is the Kangxi Emperor's stepmother. She was immobilised and imprisoned in a wardrobe in her room by Mao Dongzhu, who has been impersonating her until she is discovered and freed by Wei Xiaobao.

Imperial court officials

- Oboi (鳌拜) is one of the Four Regents who govern the Qing Empire when the Kangxi Emperor is still a child. With Wei Xiaobao's help, the emperor ousts Oboi from power and imprisons him. Wei Xiaobao later kills Oboi by accident.
- Prince Kang (康親王) is a cousin of the Kangxi Emperor. He befriends Wei Xiaobao.
- Songgotu (索額圖) is Sonin's son who serves as Vice Minister of Personnel, First Class Imperial Guard, and Grand Secretary. He befriends Wei Xiaobao and becomes sworn brothers with him.
- Batai (巴泰) is the Minister of Rites and Grand Secretary of the Zhonghe Hall.
- Wei Zhouzuo (衛周祚) is the Grand Secretary of the Baohe Hall.
- Mishan (米思翰) is the Minister of Revenue.
- Duikana (對喀納) is the Grand Secretary of the Wenhua Hall.
- Du Lide (杜立德) is a Grand Secretary.
- Tuhai (圖海) is a Grand Secretary.
- Mingju (明珠) is the Minister of War.
- Jelken (折爾肯) is the Vice Minister of Rites.
- Daerli (達爾禮) is the Secretary of the Hanlin Academy.
- Moluo (莫洛) is the Minister of Justice.
- Li Wei (李蔚) is a Grand Secretary.
- Isangga (伊桑阿) is the Minister of Personnel.
- Li Lei (李雷) is the Minister of Revenue and Grand Secretary of the Baohe Hall.
- Tong Guogang (佟國綱) is a First Class Duke and Han commander of the Bordered Yellow Banner. He is also the Kangxi Emperor's maternal uncle.
- Ledehong (勒德洪)
- Feng Pu (馮溥)
- Wang Xi (王熙)
- Huang Ji (黃機)
- Wu Zhengzhi (吳正治)
- Zong Deyi (宗德宜)
- Adam Schall von Bell (湯若望)
- Ferdinand Verbiest (南懷仁)

Imperial guards

- Duolong (多隆) is the Supervisor of the Imperial Guards and a close friend of Wei Xiaobao. At one point, Wei reluctantly kills him in order to save the Tiandihui members who are under siege by imperial guards. It turns out later that he has survived and does not know that Wei had attempted to kill him earlier.
- Rui Dong (瑞棟), nicknamed "Undefeated Iron Palm" (鐵掌無敵), is the Deputy Supervisor of the Imperial Guards. Mao Dongzhu sends him to kill Wei Xiaobao but Wei outsmarts him and kills him.
- Chaerzhu (察爾珠) is a cavalry commander of the Plain Yellow Banner.
- Zhang Kangnian (張康年zhl)
- Zhao Qixian (趙齊賢)
- Shi Laoliu (施老六) is killed by Mao Dongzhu.
- Xiong Laoer (熊老二) is killed by Mao Dongzhu.
- Ge Tong (葛通) is killed by the Wangwu Sect members.
- Captain Gua (瓜管帶) is killed by Chen Jinnan.
- Shi Song (史松), nicknamed "Black Dragon Whip" (黑龍鞭), tries to arrest Mao Shiba. Wei Xiaobao kills him and saves Mao Shiba.
- Fuchun (富春) is a cavalry officer.
- Ajichi (阿濟赤) is a vanguard commander.
- Commander Tai (泰都統) is a vanguard officer.

Eunuchs and palace maids

- Hai Dafu (海大富) is a fifth-class eunuch serving as deputy supervisor of the imperial kitchen. He is also a member of the Kongtong Sect and has received a secret mission from the Shunzhi Emperor to investigate Consort Donggo's death. He kidnaps Wei Xiaobao and brings him into the imperial palace. Later, he is killed by Mao Dongzhu in a fight after confirming his suspicion that she murdered Consort Donggo.
- Xiaoguizi (小桂子) is a young eunuch serving under Hai Dafu. Wei Xiaobao kills him and impersonates him and continues serving under Hai Dafu.
- Eunuch Wu (烏公公) is in charge of the imperial study.
- Wen Youdao (溫有道) and Wen Youfang (溫有方) are eunuchs serving in the imperial study.
- Pingwei (平威)
- Ruichu (蕊初) is Mao Dongzhu's personal handmaiden.
- Dong Jinkui (董金魁) is a eunuch serving as Mao Dongzhu's messenger. He is killed by Wei Xiaobao.

Defectors from Tungning

- Shi Lang (施琅) is a naval officer of Tungning. After the Tungning ruler Zheng Jing executes his family, he defects to the Qing Empire and meets Wei Xiaobao, who recommends him as a talent to the Kangxi Emperor because of his expertise in naval warfare. He leads the Qing navy against Tungning during the Battle of Penghu.
- Lin Xingzhu (林興珠)
- Hong Chao (洪朝)
- He You (何佑)

Others

- Wu Zhirong (吳之榮) is the governor of Yangzhou. He played a key role in the massacre of the Zhuang family of Huzhou many years ago. Shuang'er recognises him and begs Wei Xiaobao to help her avenge her family. Wei then frames him for collaborating with Wu Sangui and has him arrested and sent to Huzhou, where he is killed by the widows of the Zhuang family.
- Jiang Baisheng (江百勝) is a military officer serving under Prince Kang.
- Huang Fu (黃甫) is a naval officer.
- Zhao Liangdong (趙良棟) is a military officer who leads Qing forces to suppress Wu Sangui's rebellion. He becomes Viceroy of Yun-Gui and Minister of War later.
- Ma You (馬佑) is a governor.
- Mu Tianyan (慕天顏) is a chief secretary.
- Lergiyen (勒爾錦) is a prince and general who leads Qing forces to suppress Wu Sangui's rebellion.
- Zhang Yong (張勇) is a provincial military commander in Yunnan.
- Wang Jinbao (王進寶) is a military officer stationed in Yunnan.
- Sun Sike (孫思克) is a military officer stationed in Yunnan.
- Major General Peng (彭參將) is a military officer stationed on the island where Wei Xiaobao goes into self-exile.
- Vice Admiral Lu (路副將) is Shi Lang's deputy.
- Bahai (巴海) is a general stationed in Ningguta.
- Sabusu (薩布素) is a general stationed in Heilongjiang.
- Vice Admiral Ban (班副將) oversees the construction of naval weapons.
- Peng Chun (朋春)
- Ma La (馬喇)
- Lang Tan (郎坦)
- Aerni (阿爾尼)
- Ma Qi (馬齊)

Characters mentioned by name only

- The Grand Empress Dowager (太皇太后) is the Kangxi Emperor's grandmother.
- Consort Donggo (董鄂妃) was the Shunzhi Emperor's favourite concubine who was murdered by Mao Dongzhu.
- Consort Zhen (貞妃) was Consort Donggo's younger sister who was also murdered by Mao Dongzhu.
- Empress Xiaokangzhang (孝康章皇后) was the Kangxi Emperor's biological mother who was murdered by Mao Dongzhu.
- Suksaha (蘇克薩哈) is one of the Four Regents who govern the Qing Empire when the Kangxi Emperor is still a child. He is framed for treason by Oboi and executed.
- Chakedan (察克旦) is Suksaha's son who is executed along with his father.
- Sonin (索尼) is one of the Four Regents and Songgotu's father.
- Ebilun (遏必隆) is one of the Four Regents.
- Hechabo (和察博) is the commander of the Bordered Red Banner.
- Tong Tulai (佟圖賴) was the father of Empress Xiaokangzhang and Tong Guogang, and the maternal grandfather of the Kangxi Emperor.
- Fudeng (富登) is the commander of the Plain Blue Banner.
- Jiakun (嘉坤) is the former commander of the Plain Blue Banner.
- Eshuoke (鄂碩克) is the commander of the Bordered Blue Banner.
- Yang Guangxian (楊光先) is an official in the Bureau of Astronomy.
- Gan Wenkun (甘文焜) is the Viceroy of Yun-Gui.
- Zhu Guozhi (朱國治) is the governor of Yunnan.
- Zhang Guogui (張國桂) is the provincial military commander of Yunnan.
- Cao Shenji (曹申吉) is the governor of Guizhou.
- Li Benshen (李本深) is the provincial military commander of Guizhou.
- Lu Yifeng (盧一峰) is the magistrate of Jing County.

== Tiandihui ==
The Tiandihui (天地會; "Heaven and Earth Society") is a secret society aiming to overthrow the Manchu-led Qing Empire and restore Han Chinese in China. It has many branches (lodges) spread throughout China. Wei Xiaobao becomes the master of Greenwood Lodge (青木堂) by chance.

- Chen Jinnan (陳近南), based on the historical figure Chen Yonghua, is the founder of the Tiandihui. He was formerly an adviser to Zheng Chenggong and has been a subject of the Kingdom of Tungning. By chance, he meets Wei Xiaobao, takes him as an apprentice and teaches him martial arts. He is killed by Zheng Keshuang.
- Wu Liuqi (吳六奇), nicknamed "Iron Beggar" (鐵丐), is a member of the Beggar Clan who was influenced by Zha Yihuang to secretly join the Tiandihui. Outside the Tiandihui, he serves as a provincial military commander in Guangdong. At one point, he becomes sworn siblings with Shuang'er. He is killed by the Gui family in a fight.

Other lodge masters

- Cai Dezhong (蔡德忠) is the master of Lotus Lodge (蓮花堂).
- Fang Dahong (方大洪) is the master of Hongshun Lodge (洪順堂).
- Ma Chaoxing (馬超興) is the master of Jiahou Lodge (家後堂).
- Hu Dedi (胡德第) is the master of Cantai Lodge (參太堂).
- Li Shikai (李式開) is the master of Honghua Lodge (宏化堂).
- Gu Zhizhong (古至中) is the master of Red Fire Lodge (赤火堂).
- Lin Yongchao (林永超) is the master of Icy Lodge (玄水堂).
- Yao Bida (姚必達) is the master of Yellow Earth Lodge (黃土堂).

Members of Greenwood Lodge

- Qi Qingbiao (祁清彪) is nicknamed "Qi the Third" (祁老三).
- "Blind Cui" (崔瞎子)
- Guan Anji (關安基) is nicknamed "Master Guan" (關夫子).
- Jia Laoliu (賈老六)
- Jia Jindao (賈金刀) is Jia Laoliu's sister and Guan Anji's wife.
- Xu Tianchuan (徐天川), nicknamed "Eight Armed Ape" (八臂猿猴), serves as a spy for the Tiandihui.
- Li Lishi (李力世)
- Taoist Xuanzhen (玄貞道人)
- Gao Yanchao (高彥超)
- Qian Laoben (錢老本)
- Fan Gang (樊鋼)
- Feng Jizhong (風際中) is a spy planted in the Tiandihui by the Kangxi Emperor. He secretly reports their activities to the emperor, including Wei Xiaobao's identity as one of its lodge masters. After Chen Jinnan dies, he reveals his true identity to Wei Xiaobao and tries to persuade Wei to help the emperor destroy the Tiandihui, but Wei refuses. He is shot to death by Shuang'er.

Others

- Mao Shiba (茅十八) is an outlaw whom Wei Xiaobao encounters and saves in Yangzhou. Mao Shiba then brings Wei Xiaobao to Beijing, where both of them are kidnapped by Hai Dafu and brought into the imperial palace. He manages to escape, joins the Tiandihui and reunites with Wei Xiaobao when the latter becomes a lodge master of the Tiandihui. Later, when the Kangxi Emperor forces Wei Xiaobao to destroy the Tiandihui, Mao Shiba accuses Wei Xiaobao of being a traitor. Mao Shiba is captured and sentenced to death but Wei Xiaobao saves him by secretly making him switch places with Feng Xifan.
- Wu Dapeng (吳大鵬) is nicknamed "Cloud Touching Hand" (摩雲手).
- Wang Tan (王潭) is nicknamed "Mountain Splitting Twin Brushes" (雙筆開山).
- Shu Hualong (舒化龍)
- Kuang Tianxiong (鄺天雄)

== Kingdom of Tungning ==
The Kingdom of Tungning (東寧王國) was founded by Zheng Chenggong, a loyalist of the fallen Ming Empire who wrestled control of Taiwan from the Dutch East India Company and planned to use Taiwan as a base of operations to restore the Ming Empire in mainland China.

- Zheng Keshuang (鄭克塽) is Zheng Jing's second son and heir to the throne of Tungning. Ake, who initially has a crush on him, gives up on him after seeing his true colours due to her pregnancy. After the Tungning defeat at the Battle of Penghu, Zheng Keshuang surrenders to the Qing Empire and receives a ducal title. Although Zheng Keshuang is a young adult in the novel, the historical Zheng Keshuang was about 12 years old when Tungning was conquered by the Qing Empire.
- Feng Xifan (馮錫範), nicknamed "One Sword Thrust That Draws No Blood" (一劍無血), is a formidable swordsman from the Kunlun Sect and Zheng Keshuang's martial arts master.

Feng Xifan's household

- Jufang (菊芳) is Feng's concubine.
- Lanxiang (蘭香) is Feng's servant.
- Xing Si (邢四) is Feng's stable keeper.

Characters mentioned by name only

- Zheng Chenggong (鄭成功), also known as Koxinga (國姓爺) and the Prince of Yanping (延平郡王), was the founder of the Kingdom of Tungning.
- Dong You (董友) was Zheng Chenggong's wife and Zheng Jing's mother.
- Zheng Jing (鄭經) was Zheng Chenggong's son and the ruler of the Kingdom of Tungning.
- Zheng Kezang (鄭克臧) was Zheng Jing's first son who was killed by Feng Xifan.
- Liu Guoxuan (劉國軒)
- Zhou Quanbin (周全斌)
- Gan Hui (甘輝)
- Ma Xin (馬信)

== Characters associated with the fallen Ming Empire ==
- Jiunan (九難) is a one-armed Buddhist nun who is the former Princess Changping (長平公主), a daughter of the Chongzhen Emperor, the last emperor of the Ming Empire. She is a prominent character in Sword Stained with Royal Blood. In this novel, she kidnapped the baby Ake and raised and trained her with the intention of using her to take revenge against those responsible for the fall of the Ming Empire. She meets Wei Xiaobao and takes him as an apprentice.
- Aqi (阿琪) is Jiunan's apprentice and Ake's senior. She marries Galdan later.
- Li Zicheng (李自成), nicknamed "Dashing King" (闖王), was the leader of the rebel forces that overthrew the Ming Empire. He has gone into hiding in Yunnan after the Qing Empire replaced the Ming Empire.
- Chen Yuanyuan (陳圓圓) is Wu Sangui's concubine and Ake's mother.
- Tao Hongying (陶红英) is a palace maid who served Princess Changping. She continues to work in the imperial palace after the Qing Empire replaced the Ming Empire. Her martial arts master ordered her to steal the "Sutra of Forty-two Chapters".
- Li Xihua (李西華) is the son of Li Yan and Hongniangzi, who served under Li Zicheng. He attempts to kill Li Zicheng to avenge his parents whom Li Zicheng forced to commit suicide.

Characters mentioned by name only

- Third Prince Zhu (朱三太子) is a son of the Chongzhen Emperor and a pretender to the Ming throne supported by the Tiandihui.
- Fifth Prince Zhu (朱五太子) is a son of Zhu Youlang and a pretender to the Ming throne supported by the House of Prince Mu.
- Zhu Shugui (朱術桂), the Prince of Ningjing (寧靖王), is a pretender to the Ming throne who took shelter in the Kingdom of Tungning. He commits suicide after Tungning surrenders to the Qing Empire.
- Li Yan (李岩) and Hongniangzi (紅娘子) were Li Xihua's parents.

== House of Prince Mu ==
The House of Prince Mu (沐王府) is a noble family based in Yunnan. Their ancestor is Mu Ying, who was made a prince by the Hongwu Emperor of the Ming Empire. After the Qing Empire replaced the Ming Empire, the House of Prince Mu and their servants continue to operate as an underground resistance movement against Wu Sangui and Qing forces stationed in Yunnan.

- Mu Jiansheng (沐劍聲) is the head of the Mu family and Mu Jianping's elder brother.
- Liu Dahong (柳大洪), nicknamed "Iron-Backed Dragon" (鐵背蒼龍), is Fang Yi's martial arts master and a servant of the Mu family.
- Wu Lishen (吳立身), nicknamed "Head-Shaking Lion" (搖頭獅子), is a servant of the Mu family. Along with Fang Yi, his two apprentices and others, he attempts to assassinate the Kangxi Emperor and push the blame to Wu Sangui. However, the attempt fails and he is captured along with his apprentices and tortured in prison. Wei Xiaobao later helps them escape and earns the gratitude of the Mu family, thereby resolving the conflict between them and the Tiandihui.
- Ao Biao (敖彪) is Wu Lishen's apprentice.
- Liu Yizhou (劉一舟) is Wu Lishen's apprentice. He is initially in a romantic relationship with Fang Yi. Later, out of cowardice, he betrays his fellows and Wei Xiaobao.
- Su Gang (蘇岡), nicknamed "Sacred Hand Resident" (聖手居士), is a servant of the Mu family and Bai Hanfeng's sworn brother.
- Bai Hanfeng (白寒楓) is a servant of the Mu family. After his brother is killed in a misunderstanding by Xu Tianchuan of the Tiandihui, he brings his fellows to seek vengeance on the Tiandihui. Wei Xiaobao resolves the conflict between the Mu family and the Tiandihui after helping Wu Lishen, Ao Biao and Liu Yizhou escape from captivity.
- Bai Hansong (白寒松) was Bai Hanfeng's elder brother who was killed by Xu Tianchuan in a misunderstanding.

== Mystic Dragon Cult ==
The Mystic Dragon Cult (神龍教) is a cult and martial arts clan based on Mystic Dragon Island (神龍島), a fictional island located off the coast of Northeast China. They are known for using poison-based martial arts. Wei Xiaobao becomes one of the cult's five emissaries by flattering Hong Antong. Later, he stirs up internal conflict within the cult and destroys it with the help of imperial forces.

- Hong Antong (洪安通) is the cult leader and a formidable martial artist. A cruel and ruthless man, he enjoys hearing his followers shower him with words of flattery. As Hong Antong has been treating his followers harshly and has incurred much resentment from them, Wei Xiaobao is able to easily provoke them into rebelling against their leader, thereby stirring up internal conflict within the cult. Hong Antong dies of exhaustion after a one-against-four fight with Xu Yunting, Zhang Danyue, Taoist Wugen and the Fat Monk.
- Xu Yunting (許雪亭) is the cult's Green Dragon Emissary (青龍使) who specialises in using a brush to execute dianxue techniques.
- Zhang Danyue (張淡月) is the cult's Black Dragon Emissary (黑龍使) who specialises in using a pair of short swords.
- Yin Jin (殷錦) is the cult's Yellow Dragon Emissary (黃龍使) who is glib-tongued but not good in martial arts.
- Taoist Wugen (無根道人) is the cult's Red Dragon Emissary (赤龍使).
- Zhong Zhiling (鍾志靈) was the cult's former White Dragon Emissary (白龍使) who was assassinated. Wei Xiaobao replaces him as the White Dragon Emissary.
- The Fat Monk (胖頭陀) was once fat but gradually shrunk in size and becomes thin after being poisoned by Hong Antong.
- The Thin Monk (瘦頭陀) is the Fat Monk's counterpart and Mao Dongzhu's lover. He is killed by the Gui family.
- Mao Dongzhu (毛東珠) is Mao Wenlong's daughter. Sent by the cult to infiltrate the imperial palace and impersonate the empress dowager, she once taught the Kangxi Emperor martial arts when he was still a boy. After her cover is blown, she flees the imperial palace and is eventually killed by the Gui family.
- Liu Yan (柳燕) is Mao Dongzhu's junior who is also sent by the cult to infiltrate the imperial palace. She disguises herself as a palace maid serving under Mao Dongzhu, who impersonates the empress dowager. At one point, Mao Dongzhu orders her to escort Wei Xiaobao to his residence to retrieve copies of the "Sutra of Forty-two Chapters", and she is killed by Fang Yi.
- Deng Bingchun (鄧炳春) is killed by Wei Xiaobao.
- Lu Gaoxuan (陸高軒)
- Yun Sumei (雲素梅)
- Zhang Laosan (章老三)

== Wu Sangui and associates ==
- Wu Sangui (吳三桂), the Prince Who Pacifies the West (平西王), is a former general of the Ming Empire who defected to the Manchus during the Battle of Shanhai Pass. After the Manchus established the Qing Empire, they rewarded him with a princedom in Yunnan. During the Kangxi Emperor's reign, he starts a rebellion against the Qing Empire.
- Wu Yingxiong (吳應熊) is Wu Sangui's son. The Kangxi Emperor arranges for a marriage between Wu Yingxiong and Princess Jianning in a bid to put Wu Sangui off guard and buy time to prepare countermeasures in case Wu Sangui rebelled. The emperor also appoints Wei Xiaobao as an imperial commissioner to escort the princess to Yunnan and oversee the wedding. However, Jianning refuses to marry Wu Yingxiong and castrates him and accuses him of raping her. Wu Yingxiong is later sent to the capital as a hostage to ensure that his father remains loyal to the Qing Empire. He is executed when his father starts a rebellion.
- Xia Guoxiang (夏國相) is Wu Sangui's son-in-law and chancellor of the Yunnan princedom. He is tricked by Wei Xiaobao into releasing the assassin who made an attempt on Wu Sangui's life.
- Ma Bao (馬寶) is a general serving under Wu Sangui.
- Yang Yizhi (楊溢之) is a military officer serving under Wu Sangui and an attendant to Wu Yingxiong. An honourable man who remains loyal to the Qing Empire despite serving under Wu Sangui, he becomes sworn brothers with Wei Xiaobao at one point. When Wu Sangui is conspiring with others to start a rebellion, Yang Yizhi attempts to dissuade his master. Wu Sangui, knowing Yang Yizhi's relationship with Wei Xiaobao, accuses Yang of betrayal and has him tortured to death.
- Ba Langxing (巴朗星) is Wu Sangui's bodyguard.

Characters mentioned by name only

- Geng Jingzhong (耿精忠), the Prince Who Guards the South (靖南王), is stationed in Fujian. He is involved in the Revolt of the Three Feudatories against the Qing Empire.
- Shang Zhixin (尚之信), the Prince Who Pacifies the South (平南王), is stationed in Guangdong. He is involved in the Revolt of the Three Feudatories.
- Sun Yanling (孫延齡) is a general stationed in Guangxi who participates in the Revolt of the Three Feudatories.
- Kong Sizhen (孔四貞) is Sun Yanling's wife who is also involved in the Revolt of the Three Feudatories.

== Tsardom of Russia ==
- Sophia (蘇菲亞) is a Russian princess who becomes regent of Russia with Wei Xiaobao's help.
- (Vasily) Golitsyn (高里津) is the Russian principal minister of state.
- (Alexei) Tolbuzin (圖爾布青) is a Russian general who argues with Wei Xiaobao over the border between the Qing Empire and Russia.
- Fyodor Golovin (費要多羅‧果羅文) is a Russian envoy to the Qing Empire.
- Yarchinsky (亞爾青斯基) is the Russian governor of Nerchinsk and Jaxa.
- Waboski (華伯斯基) and Kironov (齊洛諾夫) are Sophia's bodyguards.

Characters mentioned by name only

- Aleksey Mikhaylovich (阿萊克修斯‧米海洛維支) was the former Tsar and father of Feodor, Peter, Ivan and Sophia.
- Feodor III (西奧圖三世) was Aleksey Mikhaylovich's son and successor as Tsar.
- Peter I (彼得一世) is Feodor's half-brother and successor as Tsar.
- Ivan (伊凡) is Peter's half-brother who co-rules with him as Tsar.
- Natalia (娜達麗亞) is Aleksey Mikhaylovich's second wife and Peter's mother. She is killed by the troops who defected to Sophia.

== Shaolin Sect ==
- Huicong (晦聰) is the abbot of Shaolin Monastery. After the Kangxi Emperor sends Wei Xiaobao as his personal representative to be a monk at Shaolin, Wei becomes second only to the abbot in Shaolin's hierarchy and all the other monks had to pay respect to him.
- Chengxin (澄心) is the head of the Bodhidharma Hall (達摩院) and chief of the "Eighteen Arhats of Shaolin".
- Chengguan (澄觀) is the head of the Prajna Hall (般若堂). An elderly monk in his 80s, he is manipulated by Wei Xiaobao to help him think of ways to speed-learn martial arts.
- Chengshi (澄識) is the head of the Discipline Hall (戒律院).
- Chengtong (澄通)
- Chengjue (澄覺)
- Jingji (淨濟)
- Jingqing (淨清)
- Jingben (淨本)
- Jingyuan (淨源)

== Mount Wutai ==
- Chengguang (澄光) is a Shaolin monk who also serves as the abbot of Qingliang Monastery (清涼寺) on Mount Wutai.
- Xingchi (行癡) is the former Shunzhi Emperor (順治皇帝) and the Kangxi Emperor's father. He disappeared mysteriously after the death of his favourite concubine, Consort Donggo, and was presumed dead until it is discovered that he has become a monk in Qingliang Monastery on Mount Wutai. He is temporarily reunited with his son with Wei Xiaobao's help, but decides to permanently detach himself from worldly affairs and continue to be a monk.
- Xingdian (行癲) is Xingchi's junior who was formerly an imperial guard supervisor before he became a monk.
- Yulin (玉林) is the master of Xingchi and Xingdian.
- Fasheng (法勝) succeeds Chengguang as the abbot of Qingliang Monastery and later becomes the abbot of Ciyun Monastery in Chang'an.
- Xinxi (心溪) is the abbot of Foguang Monastery (佛光寺) on Mount Wutai.

== Wangwu Sect ==
The Wangwu Sect (王屋派) is a martial arts school founded by Situ Bolei, a former subordinate of Wu Sangui when the latter was still guarding Shanhai Pass as a general of the Ming Empire. After Wu Sangui defected to the Qing Empire, Situ Bolei and the men who were still loyal to the Ming Empire decided to leave. They settled down on Mount Wangwu, where Situ Bolei started the Wangwu Sect to resist the Qing Empire. After Situ Bolei's death, the remaining Wangwu Sect members joined the Tiandihui.

- Situ Bolei (司徒伯雷) was the founder of the Wangwu Sect. Wu Sangui sent Ba Langxing to find Situ Bolei and persuade him to join him in Yunnan. When Situ refused, Ba killed him and cut off his head.
- Situ He (司徒鶴) is Situ Bolei's son.
- Taoist Wufu (五符道人)
- Yuan Yifang (元義方)

== Mongols ==
- Galdan (葛爾丹) is a Mongol prince who allies with Wu Sangui when the latter rebels against the Qing Empire. He initially blames Wei Xiaobao for the failure of the revolt but is later deceived by Wei into believing that Wu Sangui betrayed him. He becomes sworn brothers with Wei and Sangye later.
- Hantiemo (罕帖摩) is an envoy sent by Galdan to meet Wu Sangui. Wei Xiaobao tricks him into describing the full plans of Wu Sangui's rebellion and then arrests him and sends him to the Kangxi Emperor.

== Tibetans ==
- Sangye (桑結) is a guardian of the Dalai Lama and a highly skilled martial artist. He becomes sworn brothers with Wei Xiaobao and Galdan.
- Bayan (巴顏) is a lama trusted by the Dalai Lama. He is sent to Mount Wutai to find the Shunzhi Emperor.
- Hubayin (呼巴音) is Sangye's junior. He is killed by Wei Xiaobao.
- Changqi (昌齊)

Characters mentioned by name only

- The Dalai Lama (達賴喇嘛)
- Shengluotuo (勝羅陀) is a lama based in Pusading.
- Dahe'er (達和爾) is a lama based in Beijing.

== Mount Hua Sect ==
- Gui Xinshu (歸辛樹), nicknamed "Invincible Divine Fists" (神拳無敵), is a member of the Mount Hua Sect who also appears in Sword Stained with Royal Blood. He is killed along with his family by imperial guards.
- Gui Erniang (歸二娘) is Gui Xinshu's wife who also appears in Sword Stained with Royal Blood.
- Gui Zhong (歸鐘) is Gui Xinshu and Gui Erniang's son who first appeared in Sword Stained with Royal Blood as a sickly infant and has grown up to become a young adult.
- Feng Nandi (馮難敵), nicknamed "All Prestigious" (八面威風), is the leader of the Mount Hua Sect.
- Feng Bupo (馮不破) and Feng Bucui (馮不催), nicknamed "Heroes of the Two Rivers" (兩河大俠), are Feng Nandi's sons.

Characters mentioned by name only

- He Tishou (何惕守) saved the female members of the Zhuang family from exile and taught them martial arts.

== Scholars ==
- Lü Liuliang (呂留良) is a scholar who explains the meanings of the "deer" and the "cauldron" to his son in the opening chapter.
  - Lü Baozhong (呂葆中) and Lü Yizhong (呂毅中) are Lü Liuliang's sons.
- Huang Zongxi (黄宗羲)
- Gu Yanwu (顧炎武)

== Zhuang family ==
Zhuang Tinglong was a merchant from Huzhou who sponsored the publication of an unauthorised history of the Ming Empire. The book contained a number of inappropriate references to the Ming Empire, along with text considered taboo and defamatory to the Qing Empire. The Qing government, then led by the regent Oboi, heard about the book and ordered an investigation, leading to the arrests of many people associated with the book, including Zhuang Tinglong's family, the book's publishers, those who possessed copies of the book, and officials who failed to report the book. In the end, the thousands of people who were involved or implicated in the case were rounded up and punished accordingly – 72 of them were executed.

- The Third Young Mistress Zhuang (莊三少奶) is the matriarch of the Zhuang family. After the men in the Zhuang family were executed, the women were exiled to Ningguta. Along the way to Ningguta, the women were saved by He Tishou, who trained them in martial arts. They returned to their residence in Huzhou and pretended to be ghosts to scare away trespassers. After learning that Wei Xiaobao has killed Oboi and avenged the men in their family, the Third Young Mistress Zhuang feels grateful to him that she orders Shuang'er to follow Wei Xiaobao and serve him.

Characters mentioned by name only

- Zhuang Tinglong (莊廷鑨)
- Zhuang Yuncheng (莊允誠) was Zhuang Tinglong's father who had the book published and distributed. He died of abuse and torture while he was imprisoned.

== Others ==
- Hu Yizhi (胡逸之), nicknamed "Hundred Victorious Saber King" (百勝刀王) and "Handsome Saber King" (美刀王), is a swordsman who has a crush on Chen Yuanyuan for many years. He follows Chen Yuanyuan to Yunnan and disguises himself so that he can protect her from danger. He meets Wei Xiaobao and becomes sworn brothers with him.
- Zha Yihuang (查伊璜), also known as Zha Jizuo (查繼佐), is a scholar from Haining. This character is purportedly an ancestor of the novel's author Jin Yong, whose birth name is Zha Liangyong.
- Ma Boren (馬博仁) is the leader of the Tantui School (潭腿門) who was invited to be a witness during the dispute between Xu Tianchuan and Bai Hanfeng.
- Lei Yixiao (雷一嘯), nicknamed "Tiger-Faced Hegemon King" (虎面霸王), was invited to be a witness during the dispute between Xu Tianchuan and Bai Hanfeng.
- Wu Tong (武通), nicknamed "Golden Spear King" (金槍王), is the leader of the Wusheng Security Service (武勝鏢局). He was invited to be a witness during the dispute between Xu Tianchuan and Bai Hanfeng.
- Shenzhao Shangren (神照上人) is a martial artist hired by Prince Kang.
- Qi Yuankai (齊元凱) is a martial artist hired by Prince Kang. He stole Prince Kang's copy of the "Sutra of Forty-Two Chapters".
- Master Lang (郎武師) is a martial artist hired by Prince Kang.
- Yu Ba (于八), nicknamed "One Stroke Less" (少一劃), is the administrator of Jixiang Temple (吉祥寺) in Fuping County.
- Yao Chun (姚春) is a physician who was invited to be a witness during the dispute between Xu Tianchuan and Bai Hanfeng.
- Huangfu Ge (皇甫閣) is a scholar from Sichuan.

Characters mentioned by name only

- Dugu Qiubai (獨孤求敗)
- Linghu Chong (令狐沖)
- Taoist Yunyan (雲雁道人) is from the Wudang Sect.
- Taoist Yunhe (雲鶴道人) is Taoist Yunyan's senior.
- Song San (宋三), nicknamed "Swift Horse" (快馬), is a friend of the Mu family.

== See also ==
- List of organisations in wuxia fiction
