= List of Sword Stained with Royal Blood characters =

List of characters from the novel Sword Stained with Royal Blood by Jin Yong

The following is a list of characters from the novel Sword Stained with Royal Blood by Jin Yong (Louis Cha). Eight of these characters also appear or are mentioned by name in The Deer and the Cauldron, another of Jin Yong's works.

== Main characters ==
- Yuan Chengzhi (袁承志) is the protagonist and Yuan Chonghuan's son. Originally trained in martial arts by Mu Renqing, he later inherits the skills of Xia Xueyi by chance. One of the most powerful swordsmen of his age, he strives to uphold justice and defend the Han Chinese nation from internal and external threats. At the end of the novel, he leaves China for good and sails to a distant land with his companions.
- Xia Xueyi (夏雪宜), nicknamed "Golden Serpent Gentleman" (金蛇郎君), was a powerful swordsman with extraordinary skills, charming good looks and a chivalrous personality. He was involved in two separate romantic relationships with He Hongyao and Wen Yi. As he is already long dead before the events of the novel take place, he is only mentioned by name throughout the novel.
- Xia Qingqing (夏青青), also known as Wen Qingqing (溫青青), is the daughter of Xia Xueyi and Wen Yi. She is first introduced as a member of the Wen family, a clan of brigands. After getting into conflict with the Wen elders, she leaves the Wen family and follows Yuan Chengzhi in pursuit of a new life.
- Ajiu (阿九) is actually Princess Changping (長平公主), the second and favourite daughter of the Chongzhen Emperor. She is introduced as a beautiful and elegant young lady who frequently hangs out with martial artists in the jianghu. She meets Yuan Chengzhi and they develop a romantic relationship, much to Xia Qingqing's jealousy and hostility. When Li Zicheng's rebels overrun the Forbidden City, her despaired father attacks her with a sword and cuts off her left arm in a desperate attempt to spare her from any humiliation if she were to be captured by the rebels. Fortunately, Yuan Chengzhi appears in time and saves her and she survives. At the end of the novel, she feels disillusioned with the world and decides to detach herself from worldly attachments, so she becomes a Buddhist nun and renames herself Jiunan (九難). She also appears in The Deer and the Cauldron, another of Jin Yong's novels.
- He Tieshou (何鐵手) is the leader of the Five Poisons Cult (五毒教) who has a hook for her right hand, as her name Tieshou (literally "iron hand") suggests. She is recruited by Prince Hui to assist him in seizing the throne from the Chongzhen Emperor. During this time, she meets Yuan Chengzhi and his friends, and plays evil pranks on them to hinder their missions. She has a crush on Xia Qingqing, who is disguised as a young male scholar, and decides to betray her cult and break ties with Prince Hui. Yuan Chengzhi succeeds in reforming her, accepts her as an apprentice, and renames her He Tishou (何惕守); Tishou means "vigilance and safeguard". She is mentioned by name in The Deer and the Cauldron.

== Yuan Chengzhi's allies ==
- Jiao Wan'er (焦婉兒) is Jiao Gongli's daughter. She seeks vengeance on Min Zihua after mistakenly thinking that he murdered her father. With Yuan Chengzhi's help, she discovers that the Taibai Sanying are the ones responsible and kills them in revenge. She marries Luo Liru.
- Luo Liru (羅立如) is one of Jiao Gongli's apprentices. Sun Zhongjun sliced off his right arm in a heated misunderstanding. Yuan Chengzhi helps him overcome his disability by teaching him a set of left-handed sword movements.
- Hong Shenghai (洪勝海) is a member of the Bohai Sect (渤海派). He has gotten into a serious misunderstanding with Gui Xinshu and Gui Erniang, who have been trying to hunt him down and kill him. He meets Yuan Chengzhi and decides to follow him for protection. Yuan helps him resolve his conflict with the Gui couple.
- Cheng Qingzhu (程青竹) is the chief of the Green Bamboo Clan (青竹幫) and the martial arts master of Ajiu.
- Sha Tianguang (沙天廣) is the leader of a group of bandits who attempt to rob Yuan Chengzhi and his friends of their treasure. When they are ambushed by Ming soldiers while scuffling for the treasure, Yuan sides with them and fights alongside them against the soldiers. Sha Tongtian is so impressed with Yuan that he pledges allegiance to him.
- Hu Guinan (胡桂南), nicknamed "Divine Thief" (聖手神偷), is a martial artist highly skilled in the art of thieving.
- Yisheng (義生) is a Buddhist monk nicknamed "Iron Arhat" (鐵羅漢).
- Shui Jian (水鑒) is a military officer in charge of escorting some prisoners. He and his men are attacked and defeated by Yuan Chengzhi and his followers. After he is captured, he pledges allegiance to Yuan, who spares his life. He helps Yuan organise his followers to form a militia and train them in warfare.

== Rebels ==
- Li Zicheng (李自成), nicknamed "Dashing King" (闖王), is the leader of the rebel forces which overthrow the corrupt Ming government. After his victory, he not only fails to deliver his promises to restore peace and stability, but also condones his followers' brutality towards the common people. The short-lived interim government he set up to replace the Ming dynasty is eventually defeated by the Manchus, who establish the Qing Empire to replace the Ming Empire. He appears again in The Deer and the Cauldron.
- Li Yan (李岩) is a trusted adviser of Li Zicheng and a general of the rebel army who befriends Yuan Chengzhi. A righteous individual, Li Yan tries to stop the moral corruption of the rebels but fails. Li Zicheng ultimately believes slanderous rumours that Li Yan is plotting against him and forces him to commit suicide..
- Hongniangzi ('Red Maiden' (紅娘子)) is Li Yan's wife who is famous for her bravery and selfless acts. She commits suicide with her husband. Their son, Li Xihua, appears in The Deer and the Cauldron in which he attempts to kill Li Zicheng to avenge his parents.
- An Daniang (安大娘) is An Jianqing's wife who briefly took care of Yuan Chengzhi when he was still a child. She serves the rebels as a spy.
- An Xiaohui (安小彗) is An Jianqing and An Daniang's daughter and a childhood friend of Yuan Chengzhi. Like her mother, she works as a spy for the rebels. Yuan Chengzhi helps her recover the lost gold from the Wen family. She marries Cui Ximin.
- Shanzong (山宗) is an organisation formed by Yuan Chonghuan's former subordinates. They took care of Yuan Chengzhi after his father's death and sent him to the Mount Hua Sect. Although they initially planned to write a petition to the Chongzhen Emperor to seek redress for Yuan Chonghuan, they ultimately decided to join Li Zicheng's rebel army after seeing that the Ming government is too corrupt to be saved. Its members include:
  - Ying Song (應松)
  - Luo Daqian (羅大千)
  - Zhu Anguo (朱安國)
  - Sun Zhongshou (孫仲壽)
  - Tian Jianxiu (田見秀)
  - Cui Qiushan (崔秋山)

== Mount Hua Sect and associates ==
- Mu Renqing (穆人清), nicknamed "Divine Sword, Immortal Ape" (神劍仙猿), is the leader of the Mount Hua Sect and Yuan Chengzhi's martial arts master. His prowess in martial arts and swordplay is legendary.
- Huang Zhen (黃真), nicknamed "Copper Brush and Iron Abacus" (銅筆鐵算盤), is Mu Renqing's first apprentice.
- Huang Zhen's apprentices:
  - Feng Nandi (馮難敵) becomes the leader of the Mount Hua Sect in The Deer and the Cauldron.
  - Cui Ximin (崔希敏)
- Gui Xinshu (歸辛樹), nicknamed "Invincible Divine Fists" (神拳無敵), is Mu Renqing's second apprentice. He and his wife, Gui Erniang (歸二娘), are extremely protective of their infant son, who is born in poor health. The three of them appear in The Deer and the Cauldron; their son, Gui Zhong (歸鐘), has grown up to become a young adult.
- Gui Xinshu's apprentices:
  - Mei Jianhe (梅劍和)
  - Liu Peisheng (劉培生)
  - Sun Zhongjun (孫仲君)
- Musang (木桑) is the leader of the Iron Sword Sect (鐵劍門) and a close friend of Mu Renqing who has also instructed Yuan Chengzhi in martial arts before. He is obsessed with weiqi and willing to spend an entire day playing with someone. At the end of the novel, he takes in Ajiu as his apprentice.
- Yuzhenzi (玉真子) is Musang's junior. Tempted by wealth and fame, he decides to betray his sect and serve the Manchus. He aids the Manchus in sabotaging the Ming forces. Yuan Chengzhi runs into trouble with him on several different occasions. He is eventually slain by the combined efforts of Yuan, Ajiu, Sun Zhongjun and He Tishou.

== Manchu forces ==
- Nurhaci (努爾哈赤), who is mentioned by name only, was the chief of the Manchu tribes. He led his forces to attack the Ming Empire and was mortally wounded during the Battle of Ningyuan.
- Huangtaiji (皇太極) is Nurhaci's son and successor who has become the emperor of the Manchus. A shrewd military leader, he tricked the Chongzhen Emperor into believing that Yuan Chonghuan was a traitor, causing the emperor to order Yuan's execution. Yuan Chengzhi attempts to assassinate him in Mukden but fails. Later, he is assassinated by his half-brother, Dorgon.
- Dorgon (多爾袞) is Huangtaiji's younger half-brother and a charismatic general. He has an affair with Huangtaiji's concubine and commits fratricide/regicide when his brother becomes suspicious of him.

== Ming forces ==
- Yuan Chonghuan (袁崇煥) was Yuan Chengzhi's father who is only mentioned by name in the novel. Formerly a general tasked with defending the Ming Empire's northern border from the Manchu invaders, he was wrongly accused of treason and put to death by the Chongzhen Emperor.
- The Chongzhen Emperor (崇禎皇帝) is the last ruler of the Ming dynasty. He mistakenly believed that Yuan Chonghuan was plotting to overthrow him, and ordered his execution. When the Forbidden City is overrun by Li Zicheng's rebels, he refuses to surrender or flee, and attempts to kill his family to prevent them from being taken captive. While trying to kill Ajiu, he slices off her left arm with a sword. With assistance from a loyal eunuch, he eventually commits suicide by hanging himself from a tree.
- An Jianqing (安劍清) is An Daniang's husband and An Xiaohui's father. Tempted by wealth and greed, he decides to serve the Ming government and becomes a jinyiwei commander. His wife leaves him in anger and joins the rebels. They have remained on opposing sides before they eventually reconcile after he is mortally wounded while protecting the Chongzhen Emperor from Prince Hui and his followers.
- Prince Hui (惠王) is a noble who attempts to usurp the throne when Li Zicheng's rebel army closes in on the capital. He hires various martial artists in the jianghu to help him overthrow the Chongzhen Emperor.
- Wu Sangui (吳三桂) is a Ming general in charge of guarding Shanhai Pass on the northeastern border. His concubine, Chen Yuanyuan, is seized by Li Zicheng when the rebels occupy the capital. In anger, Wu defects to the Manchus and opens Shanhai Pass for the Manchus to enter and help him defeat Li Zicheng. He appears again as a minor antagonist in The Deer and the Cauldron.
- Chen Yuanyuan (陳圓圓) is Wu Sangui's concubine and is regarded as the most beautiful woman in the Ming Empire at the time. Li Zicheng seizes her as a trophy after occupying Beijing, causing Wu Sangui to defect to the Manchus. She appears again in The Deer and the Cauldron as the mother of Ake, one of Wei Xiaobao's seven wives.
- Shi Bingguang (史秉光), Shi Bingwen (史秉文) and Li Gang (黎剛), collectively known as the "Taibai Sanying" (太白三英), are three treacherous swordsmen who serve as spies for the Manchus. They murder Jiao Gongli and attempt to push the blame to Min Zihua before they are eventually slain by Jiao Wan'er after she uncovers the truth behind her father's death.

== Five Poisons Cult ==
The Five Poisons Cult (五毒教) is a cult and martial arts clan founded by a group of Miao people. They specialise in using poisons and venoms against their enemies; the "Five Poisons" refers to the five sacred venomous species (snake, scorpion, toad, centipede and spider) in their cult. They are led by He Tieshou, who is recruited by Prince Hui to help him overthrow the Chongzhen Emperor and seize the throne.

- He Hongyao (何紅藥) is He Tieshou's aunt and one of the cult's elders. She has a past romantic affair with Xia Xueyi and seeks vengeance on him after he betrays her love. When she learns that Xia Qingqing is Xia Xueyi's daughter, she directs her anger towards Xia Qingqing and attempts to harm her. She is killed in a toxic explosion in the cave where Xia Xueyi is buried.
- Qi Yun'ao (齊雲璈) is an elder of the cult who specialises in using snake venom and often disguises himself as a beggar. He is killed by He Hongyao during the cult's internal conflict.

== Wen family ==
- Wen Fangda (溫方達), Wen Fangyi (溫方義), Wen Fangshan (溫方山), Wen Fangshi (溫方施) and Wen Fangwu (溫方悟), collectively known as the Five Wen Elders, are the five patriarchs of the Wen family who lead a group of brigands. Previously notorious bandits with a hideous history, they had a blood feud with Xia Xueyi because they had murdered his family. Their battle formation, known as the Five Elements Formation, proves a challenge to Yuan Chengzhi.
- Wen Yi (溫儀) is Wen Fangshan's daughter and Xia Qingqing's mother. She fell in love with Xia Xueyi even though he had a history of bad blood with her family. Her father and uncles used her as bait to lure Xia Xueyi into a trap and crippled him, but she aided him in escaping. Her family treats her and her daughter coldly after Xia Xueyi's disappearance.

== Others ==
- Min Zihua (閔子華) is a member of the Xiandu Sect (仙都派). He was misled into believing that Jiao Gongli killed his brother, so he rallied a group of martial artists to join him in confronting Jiao Gongli. Yuan Chengzhi helps to defuse the conflict and clear Jiao's name. As part of an earlier agreement, Min Zihua hands over his villa to Yuan Chengzhi and promises never to bother Jiao Gongli again.
- Jiao Gongli (焦公禮) is the chief of the Golden Dragon Clan (金龍幫) who is murdered by the "Taibai Sanying", who attempt to push the blame to his former rival, Min Zihua.
- Meng Bofei (孟伯飛) is a reputable elderly martial artist who is nominated to lead a group of martial artists gathered on Mount Tai. He loses the position to Yuan Chengzhi.
- Zhang Chaotang (張朝唐), Yang Pengju (楊鵬舉) and Zhang Kang (張康) are three ethnic Chinese officials from the Bruneian Empire who visit China.
- Raymond (雷蒙), Peter (彼得) and Rooklyn (若克琳) are three Europeans overseeing the sale of a battery of cannons to the Ming imperial army. They present Yuan Chengzhi with a map of the Far East after losing to him in a duel.
- Zhang Chunjiu (張春九), who is mentioned by name only, was a martial artist who sought the whereabouts of Xia Xueyi. He was killed by Xia Xueyi after finding the Golden Serpent Manual on Mount Hua.

== See also ==
- List of organisations in wuxia fiction
