= The Duke of Mount Deer (1998 TV series) =

1998 Hong Kong television series

- DVD cover art
- Also known as: The Duke of Mount Deer 1998
- 鹿鼎記
- Genre: Wuxia; Comedy; Historical fiction
- Based on: The Deer and the Cauldron by Jin Yong
- Starring: Jordan Chan; Steven Ma; Cherie Chan; Rain Lau
- Theme music composer: Tsui Yuen; Ronald Ng
- Opening theme: "Influential and Popular Person" (叱吒紅人) by Jordan Chan
- Ending theme: "The Sky Above My Head" (頭頂一片天) by Steven Ma
- Country of origin: Hong Kong
- Original language: Cantonese
- No. of episodes: 45

Production
- Executive producer: Lee Tim-shing
- Production location: Hong Kong
- Running time: ≈45 minutes per episode
- Production company: TVB

Original release
- Network: TVB
- Release: 1 June – 31 July 1998

The Duke of Mount Deer (鹿鼎記) is a Hong Kong wuxia-comedy television series adapted from the novel The Deer and the Cauldron by Jin Yong. It was first aired on TVB in Hong Kong in 1998.

== Synopsis ==
Wei Xiaobao is the son of a prostitute in a brothel in Yangzhou. After joining the Heaven and Earth Society, he heads to the capital and gets enrolled into the service of the palace eunuchs. There, he becomes friends with the young Kangxi Emperor and falls in love with the emperor's younger sister, Princess Jianning. His adventures in the Forbidden City leads him into discovering that the empress dowager is an impostor; finding several volumes of the Sutra of Forty-two Chapters, which contains the location of a treasure cave; helps the emperor kill the overbearing aristocrat Oboi; and see his position rise from humble eunuch to a grand courtier and confidante of the emperor.

== Cast ==
- Jordan Chan as Wei Xiaobao
- Steven Ma as the Kangxi Emperor
- Rain Lau as Princess Jianning
- Cherie Chan as Shuang'er
- Noel Leung as Ake / Chen Yuanyuan
- Michelle Fung as Su Quan
- Hilary Tsui as Fang Yi
- Chan On-kei as Zeng Rou
- May Kwong as Mu Jianping
- Law Koon-lan as Wei Chunhua
- Ching Hor-wai as the Empress Dowager
- Ku Feng as Hai Dafu
- Ricky Wong as Oboi
- Kwan Hoi-san as Chen Wenliang / Chen Guang
- Lau Kong as Prince Kang
- Danny Summer as Chen Jinnan
- Pau Fong as Hong Antong
- Celine Ma as Mao Dongzhu
- Wong Wai as Wu Sangui
- Mark Kwok as Zheng Keshuang
- Andy Tai as Wu Yingxiong
- Law Ho-kai as Songgotu
- Wilson Tsui as Duolong
- Tang Ying-man as Zhang Kangnian
- Yeung Tsi-to as Zhao Qixian
- Joe Junior as Johann Adam Schall von Bell
- Peter Lai as Nalan Mingzhu
- Wah Chung-nam as Li Zicheng
- Kwong Tso-fai as Shi Lang
- Chan Chung-kin as Suksaha
- Lee Kong-lung as Wu Liuqi
- Cheng Ka-sang as Xu Tianchuan
- Chan Wing-chun as Feng Jizhong
- Choi Kwok-hing as Qian Laoben
- Yu Tin-wai as Taoist Xuanzhen
- Sit Chun-kei as Guan Fuzi
- Fong Kit as Gao Yanchao
- Cheung Chun-wah as Jia Laoliu
- Chan Tik-hak as Zhong Zhiling
- Che Po-law as Fat Monk
- Wong Chun-hong as Thin Monk
- Cheung Hon-ban as Lu Gaoxuan
- Lee Ka-keung as Mu Jiansheng
- Lok Tat-wah as Liu Yizhou
- Tang Yu-wing as Asha
- Leo Tsang as Mulima
- Wong Sing-seung as Banbuershan
- Ho Pik-kin as Geng Jingzhong
- Au Ngok as Shang Kexi
- Kiu Hung as Wu Zhirong
- Wong Man-piu as Xia Guoxiang
- Chan On-ying as Tao Hongying
- Yau Wai-chan as Liu Yan
- Irene Wong as Rui Chu
- Siu Cheuk-yiu as Rui Dong
- Lee Wong-sang as Wo He
- Yau Biu as Liang Jiu
- Ng Man-sang as Xiaoguizi
- Tong Chun-ming as Wen Youdao
- Leung Chiu-ho as Wen Youfang
- Mak Tsi-wan as Shi Song
- Cheng Lui as Taoist Wugen
- Lee Tsi-kei as Yin Jin
- Cheung Hung-cheung as Xu Xueting
- Ling Hon as Zhang Danyue
- Leung Kin-pin as Zhang Laosan
- Wong Wai-tak as Bai Hansong
- Lee Wai-man as Bai Hanfeng
- Wong Tin-chak as Lu Yifeng
- Wong Chi-wai as Balangxing
- Pok Kwan as Yang Yizhi
- Lai Suen as Grand Lady Zheng
- Kwok Tak-shun as Feng Xifan
- Lilly Li as Jiunan
- Cheung Kwok-keung as Xingchi / the Shunzhi Emperor
- Sun Kwai-hing as Master Yulin
- Tam Yat-ching as Chengguang
- Yu Tze-ming as Chengguan
- Tam Chuen-hing as Chengtong
- Toi Siu-man as Chengxin
- Ma Kim-kwong as Chengshi
- Chun Hung as Xingdian
- Lee Chi-wah as Jingben
- Lee Chi-wai as Jingjing
- To Shek-man as Liu Dahong
- Cho Kei as Wu Lishen
- Chun Wong as Mao Shiba
- Wong Sun as Zhuang Yuncheng
- Shek Wan as Situ Bolei
- Man Kit-wan as Third Mistress Zhuang
- Hung Tsi-hoi as the Chongzhen Emperor
- Lui Kon-man as Bantu
- Wong Siu-lung as Qi Yuanhai
- Yu Ying-ho as Deng Bingchun
- Yau Man-shing as Galdan Boshugtu Khan
- Lee Hung-kit as Master Bayan
- Hui See-man as the shaman's wife
- Law Kwan-tso as Desi Sangye Gyatso
- Leung Chung as Feng Nandi
- Kwok Cheuk-wah as Hantiemo
- Wan Yu-hung as Wen Jun
- Yip Chun-shing as Lin Xingzhu
- Ho Kwok-wing as Vasily Golitsyn
- Lau Hiu-tong as Sophia Alekseyevna
- Koo Ming-wah as Zhao Liangdong
- Ngai Wai-man as Zhang Yong
- Tang Yu-chiu as Wang Jinbao
- Cheung Hak as Sun Sike
- Law Kong as Gui Xinshu
- Law Lan as Gui Erniang
- Chan Min-leung as Gui Zhong
