= Royal Tramp (TV series) =

2008 Chinese TV series

- DVD box art
- Also known as: The Deer and the Cauldron; The Duke of Mount Deer
- 鹿鼎记
- Genre: Wuxia; Comedy; Historical fiction
- Based on: The Deer and the Cauldron by Jin Yong
- Screenplay by: Gao Dayong; Lang Xuefeng; Huang Yonghui; Kang Feng; Gao Rongrong
- Directed by: Yu Min
- Presented by: Wang Zhongjun; Pu Shulin
- Starring: Huang Xiaoming; Wallace Chung; Cherrie Ying; He Zhuoyan; Shu Chang; Liu Zi; Liu Yun; Hu Ke; Li Fei'er
- Theme music composer: Chen Tong
- Opening theme: "How Did It Suddenly Become Like This" (怎么忽然就成了这样) by Zhang Xin
- Ending theme: "Turn Back" (回转) by Zhang Jiang
- Country of origin: China
- Original language: Mandarin
- No. of episodes: 50

Production
- Executive producers: Xiaochun; Wang Zhonglei
- Producers: Zhang Jizhong; Song Yaping
- Production location: China
- Cinematography: Yu Min
- Running time: ≈45 minutes per episode
- Production companies: Huayi Brothers; Beijing Cathay Media

Original release
- Network: Jiangsu TV
- Release: 5 May 2008 – 2008

Royal Tramp (鹿鼎记) is a 2008 Chinese wuxia-comedy television series adapted from the novel The Deer and the Cauldron by Jin Yong. Produced by Zhang Jizhong and Huayi Brothers, the series consists of 50 episodes, filmed in high definition. The series was first broadcast on Jiangsu TV in China in 2008 and was subsequently aired on TVB in Hong Kong and other countries.

== Cast ==
- Huang Xiaoming as Wei Xiaobao
  - Wang Chengyang as Wei Xiaobao (child)
- Wallace Chung as the Kangxi Emperor
  - Shi Lei as the Kangxi Emperor (child)
- He Zhuoyan as Shuang'er
- Shu Chang as Princess Jianning
- Liu Zi as Fang Yi
- Liu Yun as Mu Jianping
- Cherrie Ying as Ake
- Hu Ke as Su Quan
- Li Fei'er as Zeng Rou
- Qiao Zhenyu as Zheng Keshuang
- Sattawat Sethakorn as Liu Yizhou
- Jing Gangshan as Feng Jizhong
- He Jiayi as Jiunan
- Tan Feiling as Songgotu
- Elvis Tsui as Oboi
- Zhu Yanping as Chen Jinnan
- Hua Zi as Hai Dafu
- Gao Yuan as Mao Dongzhu / the Empress Dowager
- Ning Jing as Chen Yuanyuan
- Ma Lin as Wei Chunhua
- Li Chengru as Xingchi (the Shunzhi Emperor)
- Zhong Liang as Wu Yingxiong
- Tu Men as Wu Sangui
- Yu Chenghui as Feng Xifan
- Liu Xiaohu as Zhang Kangnian
- Rocky Hou as Yang Yizhi
- Wang Xiaoming as Mu Jiansheng
- Li Xintong as Aqi
- Hu Dong as Duolong
- Xiao Xiangyu as Gui Erniang
- Li Zefeng as Gui Zhong
- Shen Baoping as Gui Xinshu
- Zhao Xiaorui as Mao Shiba
- Xue Zhongrui as Prince Kang
- Yang Niansheng as Xu Tianchuan
- Liu Naiyi as Taoist Xuanzhen
- Li Ming as Qian Laoben
- Yan Guanying as Fat Monk
- Qin Weidong as Thin Monk
- Wang Jianguo as Qi Qingbiao
- Sang Weilin as Zhao Liangdong
- Chen Zhihui as Li Zicheng
- Huang Gexuan as Galdan Boshugtu Khan
- Zhang Hengping as Taoist Wugen
- Yuan Yuan as Hong Antong
- Huang Suying as the mamasan of Lichun Brothel
- Liu Duan Duan as Ao Biao
- Tao Jixin as Liu Dahong
- Qiao Yu as Li Xihua
- Zhou Gang as Xingdian
- Zhou Xiaobin as Deng Bingchun
- Li Na as Liu Yan
- Zhao Da as Wen Youdao
- Zhao Jintao as Wen Youfang
- Sun Lihua as Ruichu
- Li Aiqin as Yunhui
- Guo Xiao'an as Deng Guan
- Xing Han as Yun Sumei
- Xi Xianfeng as the Green Dragon Marshal
- Wang Jingluan as Taohua
- Yang Lin as Yu Ba
- Liu Guanlin as Jing Ji
- Zhang Chi as Huang Lizhou
- Su Mao as Lu Gaoxuan
- Lu Shigang as Guan Anji
- Zhao Gang as Xia Guoxiang
- Hou Yueqiu as Zhang Danyue
- Zhao Yang as Wang Jinbao
- Ren Baocheng as Shi Lang
- Chen Hai as Lin Xingzhu
- Zhang Gong as Hu Yizhi
- Li Jun as Deng Guang
- Ma Zijun as Huicong
- Ren Wu as the Qingliang Temple abbot
- Zha Xi as Wu Zhirong
- Su Yan as Xiaoguizi
- Li Yuan as Peng Chun
- Gao Fei as Third Young Mistress Zhuang
- De Long as Gao Lijin
- Zhao Guixiang as Gu Yanwu
- Hu Qingshi as Zha Jizuo
- Chen Zhou as Lü Liuliang
- Wang Bing as Bayan
- Dong Zhigang as Yu Lin
- Shen Tian as Xing Hua
- Ye Jing as Huangfu Ge
- Yuan Ming as Rui Dong
- Zhang Kai as Wei Tongchui
- Li Chen as Wei Hutou
- Jin Wenting as Wei Shuangshuang
- Ba Tu as Wu Lishen
- Han Yueqiao as Tao Hongying
- Kerry Berry Brogan as Sophia Alekseyevna
