= Hero – Beyond the Boundary of Time =

1993 Hong Kong fantasy comedy film

- DVD cover
- 正牌韋小寶之奉旨溝女
- Directed by: Blackie Ko
- Written by: Matt Chow; Joe Ma; Clarence Yip; Lei Yan
- Produced by: Clarence Yip
- Starring: Tony Leung; Dicky Cheung
- Cinematography: Andrew Lau
- Edited by: Cheng Chak-man; Chan Kei-hop
- Music by: Richard Lo
- Production company: Movie Impact Films Investment
- Distributed by: Newport Entertainment
- Release date: 12 June 1993
- Running time: 94 minutes
- Country: Hong Kong
- Language: Cantonese
- Box office: HK$10,348,938

Hero – Beyond the Boundary of Time (正牌韋小寶之奉旨溝女) is a 1993 Hong Kong fantasy comedy film directed by Blackie Ko, starring Tony Leung as Wei Xiaobao, a role he previously portrayed in the 1984 television series The Duke of Mount Deer. The story is a spin-off of the wuxia novel The Deer and the Cauldron, following Wei Xiaobao's adventures as he travels through time from the Qing dynasty to 1993 Hong Kong.

== Synopsis ==
Acting on an order from the Kangxi Emperor, Wei Xiaobao travels through time from the 17th century to 1993 Hong Kong to investigate and avert an upcoming crisis.

== Cast ==
- Tony Leung as Wei Xiaobao
- Dicky Cheung as Chao
- Ng Suet-man as Xia
- Veronica Yip as Princess Jianning
- Kent Tong as the Kangxi Emperor
- Lee Fai as Shuang'er
- Chang Gan-wing as Uncle Hua
- Jamie Luk as Xiong
- Lee Yuet-sin as Xiong's wife
- Billy Ching as Cai
