= Zha Jizuo =

Zha Jizuo 查繼佐 other names
- Born: 1601; Haining, Zhejiang
- Died: 1676 (aged 74–75)
- Occupations: Writer, scholar
- Relatives: Zha Erhan (father)
- Writing career
- Notable works: Zui Wei Lu; Guo Shou Lu; Lu Chunqiu; Dongshan Guoyu; Ban Han Shi Lun; Xu Xixiang

Zha Jizuo (1601–1676) was a Chinese writer and scholar who lived during the late Ming dynasty and early Qing dynasty.

== Names ==
Zha Jizuo's given name was originally Jiyou (繼佑) before he changed it to Jizuo (繼佐). His courtesy name was originally Sanxiu (三秀) but was later changed to Yousan (友三). He was also known by various pseudonyms, including Yihuang (伊璜), Yuzhai (與齋), Dongshan Diaoshi (東山釣史), Dongshan Diaoyu (東山釣玉), Zuoyi Feiren (左尹非人), and Jingxiu Xiansheng (敬修先生).

== Life under the Ming dynasty ==
Zha was born in an impoverished family in Haining, Zhejiang Province during the late Ming dynasty. His ancestral home was in Wuyuan County, Jiangxi Province. His father was Zha Erhan (查爾翰). In 1633, he sat for the imperial examination and obtained the position of juren.

After the fall of the Ming dynasty in 1644, Zha accompanied Zhu Yihai, the Prince of Lu, to Shaoxing, where the latter proclaimed himself the regent of the Southern Ming, a state formed by Ming loyalists. Zha was appointed as an official in the Ministry of War of the Southern Ming government. When the forces of the Manchu-led Qing dynasty invaded Zhejiang Province, Zha joined the Southern Ming forces in resisting the invaders until Shaoxing fell to Qing forces in 1646.

== Life under the Qing dynasty ==
Zha then went into retirement in present-day Xiashi District in Haining, Zhejiang Province. In 1652, he moved to Hangzhou, where he taught at Juejue School (覺覺堂) near the West Lake and later at Jingxiu School (敬修堂) in Tiezhiling (鐵治嶺). He had thousands of students, who referred to him as "Jingxiu Xiansheng".

In 1661, Zha was implicated in a case of literary inquisition involving a merchant, Zhuang Tinglong, who had sponsored the publication of an unauthorised book on the history of the Ming dynasty because Zha had helped to proofread the book before it was published. (This book was different from the History of Ming, which was approved by the Qing government.) Although Zha was arrested and imprisoned, he was eventually released.

Two historical texts – Lang Qian Ji Wen (郎潛紀聞) and Ming Shi Ji Shi Ben Mo (明史紀事本末) – mentioned that Zha was responsible for reporting the unauthorised book to the Qing government.

Another account stated that Wu Liuqi saved Zha from imprisonment because he wanted to repay Zha's kindness. Zha himself denied this account in Zha Jizuo Nianpu (查继佐年譜). Wu Qian (吳騫; 1733–1813) also wrote in Bai Jing Lou Shi Hua (拜經樓詩話) that the account involving Wu Liuqi was unreliable and unlikely to be true.

In his later years, Zha wrote a number of books and other writings, including Zui Wei Lu (罪惟錄), Guo Shou Lu (國壽錄), Lu Chunqiu (魯春秋), Dongshan Guoyu (東山國語), Ban Han Shi Lun (班漢史淪), and Xu Xixiang (續西廂).

== Relation to Jin Yong ==
Zha was from the scholarly Zha clan of Haining, whose members include the wuxia writer Zha Liangyong, who is better known by his pen name Jin Yong. Jin Yong was also born in the same place as Zha Jizuo: Haining, Zhejiang. Zha Jizuo appears as a minor character in one of Jin Yong's novels, The Deer and the Cauldron.
