= Zhuang Tinglong case =

Literary inquisition in China (1661–1663)

The Zhuang Tinglong case, also known as the Ming History case, was a 17th-century case of literary inquisition which took place in China between 1661 and 1663 during the Qing dynasty. The case was about the publication of an unauthorised history of the Ming dynasty – the ruling dynasty in China before the Qing dynasty – by Zhuang Tinglong (莊廷鑨), a merchant from Huzhou, Zhejiang. At the end, thousands of people associated with the publication of the work were punished, including over 70 put to death.

== Background ==
Zhuang Tinglong was a wealthy merchant from Nanxun, which is in present-day Huzhou, Zhejiang. He desired to emulate Zuo Qiuming (556–451 BCE), the author of the Zuo Zhuan who was also blind like him, by publishing a book of history on the Ming dynasty. However, he knew little about Ming history, so he decided to start with materials that were already available. He purchased a draft of Ming history, written earlier by Zhu Guozhen. Later, he hired a team of 16 scholars from the Jiangnan region, including Wu Yan (吳炎) and Pan Chengzhang (潘檉章), to help him edit and build on Zhu Guozhen's work.

The book contained a number of inappropriate references to the Ming dynasty, as well as text considered taboo and defamatory to the Qing dynasty. Some examples include the use of era names of the Ming emperors and other Ming titles and forms; denial of the legitimacy of the Qing dynasty; references to the Manchus and Jianzhou Jurchens as "barbarians"; and references to the Qing emperors by their personal names.

The book was published under the title History of Ming and contained more than 100 volumes. Li Lingxi (李令皙) wrote the preface, while Zhuang Tinglong was credited as the lead writer. Other contributors to the book include: Wu Yan (吳炎), Pan Chengzhang (潘檉章), Mao Yuanming (茅元銘), Wu Zhiming (吳之銘), Wu Zhirong (吳之熔), Li Tao (李濤), Mao Cilai (茅次萊), Wu Chu (吳楚), Tang Yuanlou (唐元樓), Yan Yunqi (嚴雲起), Jiang Linzheng (蔣麟徵), Wei Jinyou (韋金佑), Wei Yiwei (韋一圍), Zhang Gao (張篙), Dong Eryou (董二酉), Lu Qi (陸圻), Zha Jizuo and Fan Xiang (范驤).

== Literary inquisition ==
Zhuang Tinglong died of illness in 1655 shortly after the book was completed. In 1660, Zhuang Tinglong's father, Zhuang Yuncheng (莊允誠), had the book printed and distributed under the title Brief Series of Ming History. In 1661, Wu Zhirong (吳之榮), (Note: This Wu Zhirong (吳之榮) was not the same person as the Wu Zhirong (吳之熔) who contributed to the book.) the magistrate of Gui'an County (in present-day Huzhou, Zhejiang), reported the book to Chen Yongming (陳永命), the prefecture governor. However, Chen Yongming dismissed the case after accepting a bribe of a few thousand silver taels from Zhuang Yuncheng. As Zhuang Yuncheng refused to bribe Wu Zhirong, the latter made another report – this time to higher authority. The imperial government in Beijing eventually found out about the book.

Oboi, the regent for the then underage Kangxi Emperor, ordered officials from the Ministry of Justice to go to Huzhou to conduct an investigation. This led to the arrests of multiple individuals associated with the book, including the Zhuang family, the publishers of the book, people who possessed copies of the book, and officials who failed to report the book. Wu Zhirong, who bore a grudge against a merchant Zhu Youming (朱佑明), used the opportunity to frame Zhu Youming for being involved. He claimed that the "Zhu" mentioned in "Zhu's original draft" in the book referred to Zhu Youming when the "Zhu" actually referred to Zhu Guozhen.

Zhuang Yuncheng was arrested and sent to Beijing, and eventually died in prison from abuse and torture. Zhuang Tinglong's remains were excavated from his grave and destroyed. In 1663, the arrested people were given various sentences ranging from execution to exile. Tang Dafu (湯達甫) and Li Xiangfu (李祥甫), who were in charge of the printing process of the book, along with bookstore owners Wang Yunjiao (王雲蛟) and Lu Deru (陸德儒), who sold copies of the book, were executed. Zhuang Tinglong's brother, Zhuang Tingyue (莊廷鉞), was executed by lingchi, and the entire Zhuang family was implicated in the case. Li Lingxi and his son Li Rengdao (李礽燾), Zhu Youming and his sons Zhu Nianshao (朱念紹), Zhu Yanshao (朱彥紹), Zhu Keshao (朱克紹) and nephew Zhu Yi (朱繹), were executed by beheading; Zhu Youming's wife committed suicide. The sentencing judge took pity on Li Lingxi's youngest son, who was then 16 years old, and offered to reduce his legal age by one year, thus sparing him from death and sentencing him to exile instead. However, the boy refused and was executed along with his family. Dong Eryou, who had already died by then, had his remains excavated and dismembered into 36 parts. His son, Dong Yuyi (董與沂), was executed. Zhao Junsong (趙君宋), a teacher in Huzhou who initially reported the book, was also convicted and executed for secretly keeping a copy of the book. Li Jibai (李繼白), an official in Xuyeguan Town in Suzhou, was executed for purchasing a copy of the book. Other officials such as Hu Shangheng (胡尚衡), Liang Huafeng (梁化鳳) and Zhang Wulie (張武烈) managed to escape persecution by heavily bribing the authorities. Fan Xiang, Zha Jizuo and Lu Qi were saved due to the intervention of Wu Liuqi and were pardoned. Wu Zhirong, who reported the book, received Zhuang Yuncheng and Zhu Youming's family fortunes as his reward.

== Aftermath ==
The case was closed on 21 June 1663. The thousands of people who were involved or implicated in the case were rounded up at a military camp in Hangzhou, where they were sentenced. 72 people were condemned to death: Zhuang Tingyue, Mao Yuanming, Jiang Linzheng, Zhang Gao, Wei Yuanjie (韋元介), Pan Chengzhang, Wu Yan, Wu Zhirong, Wu Zhiming and others were executed by lingchi. Song Kui (松奎), the general of Hangzhou, and Zhu Changzuo (朱昌祚), the provincial governor of Zhejiang, along with their subordinates, were dismissed from office. Cheng Weifan (程維藩), who instigated Song Kui to accept bribes to cover up the case, was executed. Two teachers from Gui'an and Wucheng counties were also executed. Chen Yongming, the prefecture governor of Huzhou, was removed from office and exiled to Tai'erzhuang, Shandong; he committed suicide during the journey but his body was sent back to Hangzhou and dismembered. Chen Yonglai (陳永賴), Chen Yongming's brother who was serving as the magistrate of Jiangning County, was executed as well. Wang Zhaozhen (王兆禎) and Li Huan (李煥), two teachers in Gui'an County, along with Tan Ximin (譚希閔), Chen Yongming's successor as prefecture governor of Huzhou, were executed by hanging, while their families were exiled to Ningguta. Gu Yanwu, who was in Fenyang, Shanxi, wrote two poems to describe his grief over the case.

== In fiction ==
The Zhuang Tinglong case is mentioned in the wuxia novel The Deer and the Cauldron by Jin Yong. In the novel, the protagonist Wei Xiaobao meets the widows of the Zhuang family who have escaped from exile and helps them take revenge against Wu Zhirong. Jin Yong, the pen name of Zha Liangyong, was a descendant of Zha Jizuo, an official who was implicated in the case but was spared from execution. Zha Jizuo also appears as a minor character in association with the case.
