= The Duke of Mount Deer (1984 Taiwanese TV series) =

1984 Taiwanese TV series

- 鹿鼎記
- Genre: Wuxia; Comedy; Historical fiction
- Based on: The Deer and the Cauldron by Jin Yong
- Screenplay by: Chang Hsin-yi
- Directed by: Chou Yu
- Starring: Li Hsiao-fei; Chou Shao-tung
- Opening theme: "Alternative Tale of Xiaobao" (小寶外傳) by Chin Pei-shan
- Ending theme: "Eagles Soar Above Pastures" (牧野鷹揚) by Chin Pei-shan
- Country of origin: Taiwan
- Original language: Mandarin
- No. of episodes: 17

Production
- Producer: Chou Yu
- Production location: Taiwan
- Running time: ≈45 minutes per episode
- Production company: CTV

Original release
- Network: CTV
- Release: 1984 – 1984

The Duke of Mount Deer (鹿鼎記) is a Taiwanese wuxia-comedy television series adapted from the novel The Deer and the Cauldron by Jin Yong. It was first aired on CTV in Taiwan in 1984.

== Cast ==
- Li Hsiao-fei as Wei Xiaobao
- Chou Shao-tung as the Kangxi Emperor
- Chen Yu-mei as Ake
- Chou Ming-hui as Fang Yi
- Ying Hsiao-wei as Mu Jianping
- Lam Sau-kwan as Su Quan
- Pei Hsin-yu as Shuang'er
- Cheng Hsueh-lin as Princess Jianning
- Hsieh Ping-nan as Chen Jinnan
- Yu Wen-hui as Jiunan
- Huang Yong-kuang as Wu Sangui
- Lin Chao-hsiung as Oboi
- Chen Hui-lo as Hai Dafu
- Tang Fu-hsiung as Songgotu
- Kuan Hung as Hong Antong
- Liu Lin as Mao Shiba
- Sung Hsian-hung as Wu Yingxiong
- Chang Han-po as Liu Yizhou
- Wang Hsieh as Liu Dahong
- Wang Chi-sheng as Feng Xifan
- Hu Chin as the Empress Dowager
- Hsu Wen-chuan as Prince Kang
- Lin Yao-chung as Zhao Qixian
- Huang Kuan-hsiung as Zhao Liangdong
- Hsieh Wen-to as Wen Youdao
- Sun Shu-pei as Gui Xinshu
- Lin Feng-chin as Gui Erniang
- Pai Yi-che as Gui Zhong
