= The Duke of Mount Deer (1984 Hong Kong TV series) =

1984 Hong Kong TV series

- Official poster
- 鹿鼎記
- Genre: Wuxia; Comedy; Historical fiction
- Based on: The Deer and the Cauldron by Jin Yong
- Screenplay by: Chan Lai-wah; Law Kam-fai; Ka Wai-nam; Chan Yuk-ping
- Directed by: Johnnie To; Lau See-yuk; Siu Kin-hang; Kuk Kwok-leung; Ma Yuk-fai
- Starring: Tony Leung; Andy Lau; Teresa Mo; Kiki Sheung
- Theme music composer: Joseph Koo
- Opening theme: "Will Turn Out to be Lucky in the End" (始終會行運) by Leslie Cheung
- Country of origin: Hong Kong
- Original language: Cantonese
- No. of episodes: 40

Production
- Executive producer: Lee Tim-shing
- Production location: Hong Kong
- Running time: ≈42 minutes per episode
- Production company: TVB

Original release
- Network: TVB Jade
- Release: 9 July – 31 August 1984

The Duke of Mount Deer (鹿鼎記) is a Hong Kong wuxia-comedy television series adapted from the novel The Deer and the Cauldron by Jin Yong, starring Tony Leung and Andy Lau. It was first broadcast on TVB in Hong Kong in 1984.

== Cast ==
- Tony Leung as Wei Xiaobao
- Andy Lau as the Kangxi Emperor
- Carina Lau as Fang Yi
- Chow Sau-lan as Shuang'er
- Sandra Ng as Zeng Rou
- Kiki Sheung as Ake / Chen Yuanyuan
- Teresa Mo as Mu Jianping
- Tomi Wong as Su Quan
- Kwan Hoi-san as Oboi
- King Doi-yum as Princess Jianning
- Kenneth Tsang as Chen Jinnan
- Lau Kong as Xingchi / the Shunzhi Emperor
- Chan Ka-yee as Jiunan
- Lau Dan as Wu Sangui
- Chu Tit-wo as Li Zicheng
- Chan Yau-how as Hong Antong
- Chun Wong as Mao Shiba
- Lau Siu-ming as Hai Dafu
- Kiu Hung as Songgotu
- Yan Pak as Wei Chunfang
- Lee Kwok-lun as Mu Jiansheng
- Deborah Moore as Sophia Alekseyevna
- Kong Ngai as Feng Jizhong
- Yeung Chak-lam as Wu Liuqi
- Bak Man-biu as Xu Tianchuan
- Ng Yip-kwong as Taoist Xuanzhen
- Tsui Hing-lam as Qian Laoben
- Tam Chuen-hing as Li Lishi
- Cheung Chi-keung as Wu Yingxiong
- Ho Kwong-lun as Yang Yizhi
- Ho Kwai-lam as Xia Guoxiang
- Eddie Kwan as Liu Yizhou
- Lau Kwok-sing as Wu Lishen
- Tam Yat-ching as Liu Dahong
- Yip Tin-hang as Feng Xifan
- Andy Tai as Zheng Keshuang
- Lui Yau-wai as Mao Dongzhu / the Empress Dowager
- Wong Man-lei as the Grand Empress Dowager
- Cheng Siu-ping as Liu Yan
- Chu Kong as Thin Monk
- Chan Kwok-kuen as Fat Monk
- Yu Ming as Lu Gaoxuan
- Chan Tik-hak as Yin Jin
- Soh Hang-suen as Tao Hongying
- Lau Shu-yee as Rui Chu
- Lam Tin as Prince Kang
- Leung Hung-wah as Zhang Kangnian
- Yeung Yim-tong as Zhao Qixian
- Mak Ho-wai as Rui Dong
- So Hon-sang as Xingdian
- Kwok Fung as Shi Lang / Zhao Liangdong
- Benz Hui as Duolong
- Chan Chung-kin as Suksaha
- Poon Wang-ban as Wen Youdao
- Sean Lau as Wen Youfang
- Chun Hung as Galdan Boshugtu Khan
- Tsui Shu-fong as Aqi
- Chan Pak-san as Lu Yifeng
- Mui Lan as Gui Erniang
- Wong Wan-choi as Gui Zhong
- Suen Kwai-hing as Master Yulin
- Cheung Ying-choi as Master Chengguan
- Kam Kwok-wai as Degele
- Ng Man-tat as Hantiemo
- Ma Hing-sang as Jia Laoliu
- Cheung Lui as Desi Sangye Gyatso
- Ko Miu-see as Consort Donggo
- Wong Yat-fei as Geng Jingzhong
- Kwan Kin as Guan Fuzi
- Man Kit-wan as Third Mistress Zhuang
- Law Kwok-wai as Wu Zhirong
- Felix Lok as Yu Ba
