= Mount Hua Sect =

Fictional martial arts sect

- Traditional Chinese: 華山派
- Simplified Chinese: 华山派
Transcriptions
Standard Mandarin
- Hanyu Pinyin: Huàshān Pài
Yue: Cantonese
- Jyutping: Waa^{4}-saan^{1} Paai^{3}

The Mount Hua Sect or Mount Hua School (華山派), also known as the Huashan Sect or Huashan School, is a fictional martial arts sect mentioned in several works of wuxia fiction. It is commonly named as one of the leading "orthodox" sects in the wulin (martial artists' community). It is named after Mount Hua, where it is based. The sect appears in three of Jin Yong's novels.

There is a real-life Mount Hua Sect which has hardly any association with martial arts. (Note: Only the Taoist sage Chen Tuan, who founded the Liuhebafa, is known to have attended the Huashan Taoist Monastery on Mount Hua. Otherwise, Mount Hua is not considered a development ground for Chinese martial arts.) It was founded during the Song dynasty by Hao Datong of the Quanzhen School of Taoism; Hao Datong also appears as a minor character in Jin Yong's Condor Trilogy. In Jin Yong's novels, these two sects are unrelated.

== History ==
In The Heaven Sword and Dragon Saber, set in the 14th century during the Yuan dynasty, the Mount Hua Sect is one of the six leading "orthodox" martial arts sects in the wulin. Its leader is Xianyu Tong.

In The Smiling, Proud Wanderer, Yue Buqun is the sect's 13th-generation leader. The Mount Hua Sect is also a member of the Five Mountain Sword Sects Alliance, an alliance formed by five "orthodox" martial arts sects specialising in swordsmanship and each based on one of the Five Great Mountains. The novel's protagonist, Linghu Chong, is Yue Buqun's first apprentice. In the novel, the Mount Hua Sect is second to only the Shaolin Sect, Wudang Sect, and Sun Moon Holy Cult.

In Sword Stained with Royal Blood, set in the 17th century towards the end of the Ming dynasty, the protagonist, Yuan Chengzhi, is a member of the Mount Hua Sect. He was trained by Mu Renqing, the sect's leader and the most powerful swordsman in the wulin at the time. The Mount Hua Sect is also one of the top four martial arts sects specialising in swordsmanship, alongside Emei, Kunlun and Diancang.

== Skills and martial arts ==
In The Smiling, Proud Wanderer, the Mount Hua Sect's martial arts are mainly about swordsmanship and neigong cultivation. The sect is split into the Sword and Qi factions, which focus on swordsmanship and neigong respectively. The division is caused by an internal conflict arising from a dispute over the Sunflower Manual by the factions' leaders. The Qi faction defeated and forced the Sword faction into exile. Since then, the Qi faction, headed by Yue Buqun, has been focusing more on neigong cultivation skills and other forms of martial arts, and reducing focus on swordsmanship, for which the Mount Hua Sect is better known in the wulin. The protagonist, Linghu Chong, becomes famous after he learns the Nine Swords of Dugu from Feng Qingyang, an elderly swordsman from the Sword faction.

In Sword Stained with Royal Blood, the sect's leader Mu Renqing is highly revered in the wulin for his prowess in martial arts, including swordsmanship. The protagonist Yuan Chengzhi was trained by Mu Renqing in swordsmanship and becomes a famous swordsman in his own right, while Mu Renqing's two other apprentices, Huang Zhen and Gui Xinshu, are known for specialising in unarmed forms of combat.

== See also ==
- Mount Hua
- Return of the Blossoming Blade
- Huaquan
