= Zhu Guozhen (Ming dynasty) =

Ming Dynasty politician and scholar (1557–1632)

62nd Senior Grand Secretary
- In office 1624
- Monarch: Tianqi
- Preceded by: Han Kuang
- Succeeded by: Gu Bingqian

Personal details
- Born: 1557
- Died: 1632 (aged 75)

Zhu Guozhen (simplified Chinese: 朱国祯; traditional Chinese: 朱國禎; pinyin: Zhū Guózhēn; 1557–1632) was a Chinese historian, politician, and writer of the Ming dynasty.

== Biography ==
He was born in 1557. He was jinshi in the imperial examination in 1589 and was a Senior Grand Secretary of the Tianqi Emperor.

Zhu was the author of Yong Zhuang Xiaopin (涌幢小品) and General History of the Ming Empire (皇明史概).

Zhu Guozhen (1558-1632) remarked on the Ming dynasty's policy on Mongols who were relocated and deported into the Ming to serve in military matters. Zhu compared the policy to the Eastern Han dynasty and Western Jin dynasty who also managed surrendered and defeated barbarians of the Five Barbarians. They also imported the barbarians into northern China, where they learned to study history. This eventually led to the rebellion, the Uprising of the Five Barbarians.

Late during the Eastern Han (25-220 C.E.), surrendering barbarians were settled in the hinterlands [of China]. In time, they learned to study and grew conversant with [matters of the] past and present. As a result, during the Jin dynasty (265-419), there occurred the Revolt of the Five Barbarian [Tribes] (late in the third and early in the fourth centuries C.E.).184 During our dynasty, surrendering barbarians were relocated to the hinterlands in great numbers. Because [the court] was generous in its stipends and awards, [the Mongols are content to] merely amuse themselves with archery and hunting. The brave185 among them gain recognition through [service in] the military. [They] serve as assistant regional commanders and regional vice commanders. Although they do not hold the seals of command, they may serve as senior officers. Some among those who receive investiture in the nobility of merit may occasionally hold the seals of command. However [because the court] places heavy emphasis on maintaining centralized control of the armies, [the Mongols] do not dare commit misdeeds. As a consequence, during the Tumu Incident, while there was unrest everywhere, it still did not amount to a major revolt. Additionally, [the Mongols] were relocated to Guangdong and Guangxi on military campaign. Thus, for more than 200 years, we have had peace throughout the realm. The dynastic forefathers' policies are the product of successive generations of guarding against the unexpected. [Our policies] are more thorough than those of the Han. The foundations of merit surpass the Sima family (founders of the Eastern Jin) ten thousand fold. In a word, one cannot generalize [about the policies towards surrendering barbarians]. 186

== Notes ==
- Hummel, Arthur W. Sr., ed. (1943). "Chu Kuo-chên" . Eminent Chinese of the Ch'ing Period. United States Government Printing Office.
