= Wu Liuqi =

- Traditional Chinese: 吳六奇
- Simplified Chinese: 吴六奇
Transcriptions
Standard Mandarin
- Hanyu Pinyin: Wú Lìuqí

Wu Liuqi (1607–1665), courtesy names Jianbo (鑒伯) and Geru (葛如), was a Chinese general of the Qing dynasty who served as the provincial military commander of Guangdong Province.

== Life ==
Wu Liuqi was born in Fengshun County, Guangdong Province during the late Ming dynasty, but his ancestral home was in Chaoyang, Guangdong Province. In his younger days, he was addicted to gambling and had squandered away his family fortune. During the chaotic period leading to the collapse of the Ming dynasty, he became a beggar in the Wuyue region and later came to serve the Yongli Emperor of the Southern Ming, a state formed by loyalists of the fallen Ming dynasty.

When the forces of the Manchu-led Qing dynasty invaded Chaozhou, Wu Liuqi surrendered to the Qing general Shang Kexi and was appointed as the chief military commander in Chaozhou. He was subsequently promoted to the position of provincial military commander of Guangdong Province.

The scholar Wang Shizhen (王士禛) wrote about Wu Liuqi in Wu Shunke Liuqi Biezhuan (吳順恪六奇別傳), claiming that when Wu Liuqi was a teenager, he had met Zha Jizuo, who commented that Wu Liuqi was "an extraordinary man". In 1663, Zha Jizuo was implicated in a case of literary inquisition and was nearly executed. However, Wu Liuqi intervened in the case and eventually saved Zha Jizuo's life.

Volume 7 of Wang Shizhen's Xiangzu Biji (香祖筆記) recorded: "(Wu) Liuqi died in office and was granted the posthumous positions of shaoshi (少師; Young Tutor) and taizi taishi (太子太師; Crown Prince's Tutor) and the posthumous name Shunke (順恪)."

== In fiction ==
Wu Liuqi was mentioned in "General of Great Strength" (大力將軍), one of the stories in Liaozhai Zhiyi, and referred to as "Wu Liuyi" (吳六一) in the tale. In this story, Zha Jizuo saw Wu Liuqi lift a huge metal bell in a temple with only one arm and take out rice from the bell. He was astounded by the feat and felt that Wu Liuyi was an extraordinary person, so he suggested that he make full use of his ability to do something that would benefit society. Many years later, after Wu Liuyi became a general, he came back to find Zha Jizuo and thank him.

In the short novel Gusheng (觚賸) by Niu Xiu (鈕琇), Wu Liuqi felt grateful to Zha Jizuo after he became the provincial military commander of Guangdong so he sent a huge rock called "Yingshifeng" (英石峰) to Zha Jizuo to express his gratitude. The rock was later renamed Zhouyunfeng (皱云峰) and became one of the "Three Famous Rocks of Jiangnan".

Wu Liuqi also appears as a minor character in the novel The Deer and the Cauldron by Jin Yong. In the novel, he is nicknamed "Iron Beggar" and is a member of the Tiandihui and Beggars' Gang.
