= Consort Donggo =

Imperial consort of the Qing dynasty

- Empress Xiaoxian
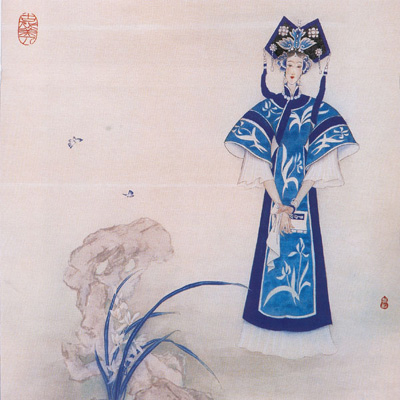
- Born: 1639 (崇德四年)
- Died: 23 September 1660 (aged 20–21) (順治十七年 八月 十九日); Chengqian Palace, Forbidden City, Beijing
- Burial: Xiao Mausoleum, Eastern Qing tombs
- Spouse: Shunzhi Emperor (m. 1656)
- Issue: Prince Rong of the First Rank
Posthumous name
- Empress Xiaoxian Zhuanghe Zhide Xuanren Wenhui Duanjing (孝獻莊和至德宣仁溫惠端敬皇后)
- House: Donggo (董鄂; by birth); Aisin-Gioro (by marriage)
- Father: Eshuo
- Mother: Lady Aisin-Gioro

Consort Donggo
- Traditional Chinese: 孝獻皇后
- Simplified Chinese: 孝献皇后
Transcriptions
Standard Mandarin
- Hanyu Pinyin: Xiàoxiàn Huánghòu

Consort Donggo (1639 – 23 September 1660), of the Manchu Plain White Banner Donggo clan, was a consort of the Shunzhi Emperor. She was one year his junior.

== Life ==
=== Family background ===
Lady Donggo's personal name was not recorded in history. Her ancestral home was in Liaoning.

- Father: Eshuo (鄂碩/鄂硕; ? – 1657), served as a first rank military official (內大臣)
  - Paternal grandfather: Xihan (席漢/席汉)
- Mother: Lady Aisin-Gioro
  - Maternal grandfather: Murhu (穆尔祜)
  - Maternal grandmother: Lady Borjigin
- One younger brother: Fiyanggū, Minister of the Imperial Guard and Qing commander-in-chief of against Galdan

=== Shunzhi era ===
In the summer of 1656, Lady Donggo entered the Forbidden City and was deeply loved and favoured by the Shunzhi Emperor. On 12 October 1656, she was granted the title "Consort Xian". On 19 January 1657, she was elevated to "Imperial Noble Consort". The Shunzhi Emperor held a grand ceremony for the promotion of Lady Donggo and proclaimed amnesty. When Lady Donggo became the Imperial Noble Consort, she shared the power of managing the inner court with Empress Xiaohuizhang, whom Emperor Shunzhi wanted to depose (however, the officials opposed to deposition of a second empress).

On 12 November 1657, Lady Donggo gave birth to the Emperor's fourth son. The premature death of their son on 25 February 1658 had a great impact on Lady Donggo and the Shunzhi Emperor. Lady Donggo fell ill and died on 23 September 1660. The Shunzhi Emperor was so overwhelmed with grief that he stopped attending daily court meetings for five days to mourn Lady Donggo. It was also said that the Shunzhi Emperor was so depressed that he wanted to commit suicide, and had to be watched every day. Two days after her death, Lady Donggo was posthumously granted the title of empress, an uncommon gesture. She was interred in the Xiao Mausoleum of the Eastern Qing tombs.

== Titles ==
- During the reign of Hong Taiji (r. 1626–1643):
  - Lady Donggo (from 1639)
- During the reign of the Shunzhi Emperor (r. 1643–1661):
  - Consort Xian (賢妃; from 12 October 1656), fourth rank consort
  - Imperial Noble Consort (皇貴妃; from 19 January 1657), second rank consort
  - Empress Xiaoxian (孝獻皇后; from 25 September 1660)

== Issue ==
- As imperial noble consort:
  - Prince Rong of the First Rank (榮親王; 12 November 1657 – 25 February 1658), the Shunzhi Emperor's fourth son

== In popular culture ==
- Portrayed by Ko Miusze in The Duke of Mount Deer (1984)
- Portrayed by Ng Ning in The Rise and Fall of Qing Dynasty (1987)
- Portrayed by Bo Hong in Kangxi Dynasty (2001)
- Portrayed by Shu Chang in Xiaozhuang Mishi (2003)
- Portrayed by Océane Zhu in The Life and Times of a Sentinel (2011)
- Portrayed by Zhang Xueying in In Love with Power (2012)

== See also ==
- Royal and noble ranks of the Qing dynasty

== Notes ==
Chinese royalty
Preceded by Empress Xiaokangzhang	Empress of China; Posthumous	Succeeded by Empress Xiaochengren
