= Literary inquisition =

Chinese term for official persecution of intellectuals for their writings

- Chinese: 文字獄
- Other name: speech crime
- Literal meaning: imprisonment due to writings

The literary inquisition (simplified Chinese: 文字狱; traditional Chinese: 文字獄; pinyin: wénzìyù; lit. 'imprisonment due to writings'), also known as speech crime (以言入罪), refers to official persecution of intellectuals for their writings in China. The Hanyu Da Cidian defines it as "when a ruler persecuted intellectuals by deliberately extracting words or phrases from an author's writings to fabricate charges against them." ("旧时谓统治者为迫害知识分子，故意从其著作中摘取字句，罗织成罪"). The Qing dynasty was particularly notorious for the practice.

In general, there are two ways a literary inquisition could be carried out. First is that the conviction came from the writing itself. That is, the writing was the direct cause of the persecution. The second is that the writing was used as a tool to provide legitimate evidence for a predetermined conviction. Such persecutions could owe even to a single phrase or word which the ruler considered offensive. Some of these were due to the naming taboo, such as writing a Chinese character that was part of the emperor's personal name. In the most serious cases, not only the writer, but also their immediate and extended families, as well as those close to them, would also be implicated and killed.

== Early history (pre-960) ==
The earliest recorded literary inquisition occurred in 548 BC in the state of Qi during the Spring and Autumn period. Recorded in the Zuo Zhuan, the powerful minister Cui Zhu (崔杼), who had murdered the ruler Duke Zhuang, killed three court historians (太史; taishi) because they insisted on recording the event in the official history. The burning of books and burying of scholars in the Qin dynasty is also considered a form of literary inquisition by some Chinese scholars. It is uncertain how frequently the persecutions occurred. However, compared to during the Ming and Qing dynasties, literary inquisition before the Song dynasty happened less frequently due to the lack of printing.

=== Han dynasty (206 BC – 220 AD) ===
One major case during the Han dynasty was that of Yang Yun (杨恽), a maternal grandson of Sima Qian. Emperor Xuan first discharged him from his position in the government under the accusation of defamation. In 54 BC, he was sentenced to death by waist chopping because of his complaints of his unfair treatment written in a letter to his friend Sun Huizong (孙会宗), which was considered disrespectful and outrageous to the Emperor. His friends still in court were also discharged from their positions. In 208 AD, Kong Rong, a lead figure of the Seven Scholars of Jian'an in the late Eastern Han dynasty, was killed by warlord Cao Cao for his letters to Cao disagreeing and criticizing his rule and practice, including Cao's ban on alcohol for its potential negative impact on the nation. His wife and two sons were also killed. In the Three Kingdoms period, the death of Ji Kang was also related to his writing. In response to Sima Zhao's offer of a position as civil official, Ji Kang wrote a letter ("与山巨源绝交书") expressing his refusal of pursuing any political career. This letter, however, later provided justification for the advice of Zhong Hui, the official who conveyed the offer for Sima Zhao to Ji Kang, to sentence Ji Kang to death.

=== Southern and Northern dynasties (420–589) ===
During the Northern Wei dynasty, prime minister Cui Hao carved Guo Shu (国书), which records the history of the ruling Tuoba clan and of which he was assigned as the lead editor, into stone monuments and located them on the side of a major road in a suburb of the capital, Pingcheng. The Xianbei bureaucrats ostensibly found exposing their ancestors' history to the public to be offensive and inappropriate. Thus, Cui Hao was accused of defaming the state and thus sentenced to death in 450. Along with Cui Hao, his whole clan, his wives' clans, and 128 officials who had participated in the editing work were all sentenced to death.

=== Sui dynasty (581–618) ===
In 609, Xue Daoheng, the grandfather of Xue Yuanchao, was sentenced to death by Emperor Yang of Sui dynasty. In response to Emperor Yang's attempt to keep Xue from retiring, Xue wrote an essay praising the previous Emperor Wen. Emperor Yang considered this response as a mockery and found it offensive. The direct cause of Xue's death was his saying in reminiscence of Gao Jiong (高熲), who supported Emperor Yang's competitor and was sentenced to death. However, there is also evidence for that the underlying cause of his death was Emperor Yang's jealousy of his talent on poetry as the author of the famous poem "Xi Xi Yan" (昔昔盐”) from the Sui dynasty. In this case, Xue's death could also be considered as a literary inquisition on poetry (诗祸; shihuo).

=== Tang dynasty (618–907) ===
During the Tang dynasty, the Jizhou (吉州) criminal Liu Shaolüe (刘绍略) was married to a woman surnamed Wang. She secretly had copies of the Sanhuangjing, which Li Shimin ordered to be burned. As a result, Li Shimin detained Liu and Wang and interrogated them. The Sanhuangjing claimed that those who chanted the inscriptions inside it would become emperor of China. In another case near the end of the Tang dynasty, someone presented a poem to Qian Liu that contained treason, so Qian Liu executed that person.

== Song dynasty (960–1279) ==
The Song dynasty marked the rise of literary inquisition both in its number of cases and in its use. During the Song dynasty, the number of literary inquisition cases reached over one hundred. The concept of literary inquisition started to take formal shape in this time period. Unlike isolated cases in previous dynasties, literary inquisition in the Song dynasty became a tool in political struggles, consciously and purposefully used by opposing political parties to suppress and eliminate opponents. However, because the founding emperor of the Song dynasty, Emperor Taizu, vowed to not kill any scholar or intellectuals who wrote to comment or address on political issues, intellectuals involved in literary inquisition in the Song dynasty were often exiled instead of sentenced to death.

=== Wang Anshi case ===
In 1079, the poet Su Shi of the Song dynasty was jailed for several months and later exiled by the Emperor Shenzong due to an accusation of writing and disseminating poems alleged to slander the court. This case was also related to the political context at that time. The state was undergoing socioeconomic reforms, the New Policies, led by Chancellor Wang Anshi. Su Shi, a conservative at the time, had however expressed his disagreement with certain practices of this reform. Such action triggered the anger of people in support of the reform, which included several persons from the Censorate (御史台; yushitai) responsible for surveilling officials and fact-finding in the case of legal procedure. One of the censorates, Li Ding, initiated the case by writing to the Emperor and accusing Su Shi for defamation. Under his effort, the Censorate pointed out more than 60 spots of evidence across more than 10 of Su Shi's poems and identified more than 20 people who have communicated with Su Shi through writings.

=== Liu Zhi case ===
During the reign of Zhao Xu (1091), Liu Zhi (刘挚) was impeached and demoted for some of his letters.

=== Huang Tingjian case ===
During the reign of Zhao Ji (1111), Huang Tingjian (黄庭坚) was demoted for slander.

=== Yue Fei case ===
The Southern Song, especially during Qin Hui's tenure as the Chancellor, marked the rise of extensive and systematic use of literary inquisition for political purposes. In face of invasion from the Jurchen Jin dynasty in the northern part of China, the debate in the court was between the "pro-war party" led by Yue Fei and the "anti-war party" advocating peace treaties with Jin. As the leader of the "anti-war party", Qin Hui used literary inquisition as a tool to intimidate or eliminate his political opponents in order to reach political conformity on the threat of Jin invasion. Qin Hui specifically targeted the leading figures of the "pro-war party", Zhao Ding (赵鼎), Hu Quan (胡铨) and Li Guang (李光). In 1138, in response to Jin's humiliating terms in their peace negotiation that would render Song a subservient state, both Zhao Ding and Hu Quan expressed strong objections. As a result, Zhao Ding was removed by Qin Hui from his position as Great Councilor in the fall of 1138. He was later exiled to modern-day Hainan where he committed suicide in 1147 when Qin Hui took action against his writing declaring again his determination against peace negotiation with Jin. Meanwhile, Hu Quan wrote in his memorial in 1138 that accepting these terms would be "[taking] the Empire of Your ancestors and [turning] it into the Empire of these dog barbarians". While these phrases spoke out for the public sentiment toward the peace negotiation, Qin Hui took it as rebellious and called for severe punishment of Hu as an example to stop other officials from doing the same. Therefore, Hu was dismissed from office, exiled to Zhaozhou (昭州) and forbidden from reinstatement.

Li Guang was also punished for his outspoken criticism of Qin Hui being a traitor. Qin Hui thus accused Li of resentment and ill will, and exiled him to today's Guangxi province in 1141. In 1150, he was further exiled to Hainan because of his attempt to compose a "private history" (野史), which was forbidden and alleged slanderous by the Emperor and Qin Hui due to their fear of potential negative record of their doings. Li Guang's case involved several other officials associated to him. One of them was Wu Yuanmei (吴元美), who was demoted as a result of Li's case. He then wrote "Tale of Two Sons of Xia" (夏二子传") expressing his feelings toward his current situation. In this writing, Wu used words "Xia" (夏) and "Shang" (商), which could be seasons as well as dynasties, and thus could be interpreted as the change of seasons from summer to autumn or the decay of dynasty. Wu also mentioned "flies and mosquitos", which were insects active in the season yet also often served as allegory with despicable person in Chinese culture. Therefore, these words provided evidence for Qin Hui to accuse him of defamation and further exiled Hu to today's Guangdong province, where Hu died.

== Ming dynasty (1368–1644) ==
The literary persecutions during the Ming dynasty were some of the most severe persecutions in Chinese history. The Ming was notorious for their vast executions and extensive literary purges, sometimes executing tens or hundreds of thousands of people at a time. Before he became emperor, Zhu Yuanzhang (the Hongwu Emperor), the Ming dynasty's founder, was illiterate and had been a beggar. While he established his empire, he surrounded himself with scholars, while he learned to read and familiarize himself with history. He sent out requests to scholars for their presence, but some declined for fear of being executed if they made a mistake. On occasion the emperor, who was learning to read, would order the execution of someone who had written something he misunderstood.

=== Li Chenggui Korean case ===
After Zhu Yuanzhang ascended the throne, Li Chenggui (李成桂) executed the entire Wang clan that ruled over Goryeo. Li then paid tribute to Zhu and the Ming. Li also sent a letter to Zhu, but Zhu saw it was offensive and thus punished the enovy. Zhu also banned all Koreans from traveling to mainland China for a period of time.

=== Zhu Jiyou case ===
In 1404 during the reign of Yongle Emperor (Zhu Di), Zhu Jiyou (朱季友) presented books to Zhu Di. Zhu Di used the contents to slander the studies of Zhou and Zhu and ordered their books to be burned and not taught.

=== Qu You case ===
In 1442 during the reign of Zhu Qizhen, he ordered books written by Qu You (瞿佑) to be banned, including the collection of novels called "Cutting Lights and Newspeak" (《剪燈新話》).

=== Liu Yan and Huang Jian case ===
In 1456, Liu Yan (劉儼) and Huang Jian (黃諫) presided over a test and were impeached due to naming taboo. Ming Daizong ordered Liu Yan and Huang Jian to be punished by the Embroidered Uniform Guard.

=== Han Bangqi case ===
In 1514, Han Bangqi (韓邦奇) wrote a ballad called "Fuchun's Ballad" (《富春謠》) that satirized some eunuchs. Han Bangqi was accused of slander, and Ming Wuzong was so angry that he imprisoned Han and dismissed him from office.

=== Wu Ting case ===
In 1525, Wu Ting (吳廷) quoted poems by Bai Juyi and Zhang Yong (張詠). Ming Shizong found Wu Ting's remarks offensive and ordered Wu to retire.

=== Jiang Rubi and Ouyang Qu case ===
In 1537, during the Yingtianfu (應天府) provincial examination, one examiner wrote on national sacrifice and war as a topic. Ming Shizong thought there was a lot of sarcasm in the examiner's answer and ordered the Embroidered Uniform Guard to arrest the examiners Jiang Rubi (江汝璧) and Ouyang Qu (歐陽衢) and transfer them to the Nanjing Law Department for investigation. Jiang and Ouyang were then demoted.

=== Shandong case ===
In 1543, Ye Jing (葉經) presided over the rural examination in Shandong province. Some of the examiners quoted lines from the Analects. The Jiajing Emperor thought two of the examiners were mocking him, so the emperor had both of those examiners killed.

=== Hu Yizong case ===
In 1550, Hu Yizong (胡纘宗), governor of Henan, wrote a poem. Ming Shizong read it and thought Hu was cursing the Ming dynasty. He then dismissed Hu from office and had Hu struck 40 times with a stick.

=== Li Mo case ===
In 1556, Li Mo (李默) opposed Yan Song and Zhao Wenhua on the selection of officials. Yan Song and Zhao then used Li Mo's writings against him, accusing Li of slandering the imperial court. Ming Shizong then removed Li from office, arrested Li and imprisoned him. Li died in prison.

=== Gao Qiyu case ===
In 1579, Gao Qiyu (高啟愚) presided over the Nanjing exam. In 1584, during the reign of the Wanli Emperor, Gao Qiyu's exam questions were denounced, and Gao was dismissed from office.

=== Li Zhi case ===
During the reign of Ming Shenzong, Li Zhi (李贄) published a book called "Burning Books" (焚書) that criticized Confucianism. In 1602, Li Zhi gave a lecture on this topic to Zhang Deyun (張德允). Ming Shenzong saw Li's lecture and then arrested and imprisoned Li for the crime of 'daring to advocate disorder and mislead the people'. Li Zhi's works were then burned by general orders, and Li was forced to commit suicide by cutting his own throat.

=== Liu Duo and Wei Zhongxian case ===
In 1625, Liu Duo (劉鐸), magistrate of Yangzhou (揚州), was dissatisfied with Wei Zhongxian. Liu wrote a poem about this and gave it to a temple monk. Wei Zhongxian then denounced Liu, interrogated him, and had Liu Duo executed on the street.

== Qing dynasty (1644–1912) ==
The Qing dynasty was founded by the Manchu people, an ethnic minority that destroyed the Ming dynasty. Like the Ming dynasty before them, the Qing elites were also sensitive to public sentiments towards them. Writers and officials usually took the stance of drawing distinctions between the Han Chinese and the Manchus; the latter were traditionally viewed as barbarians in Han Chinese culture. However, while the Manchus were in charge, writers resorted to veiled satire. Gu Mingdong writes that the Manchus became almost paranoid about the meanings associated with the Chinese characters for 'bright' and 'clear', 'Ming' and 'Qing' respectively. One inquisition was the "case of the History of the Ming Dynasty" (明史案) in 1661–1662 under the direction of regents (before the Kangxi Emperor came in power in 1669) in which about 70 were killed and more exiled. (Note: The wuxia writer Louis Cha used this case as a prologue for his novel The Deer and the Cauldron.)

Under the Qing dynasty, literary inquisition began with isolated cases during the reigns of the Shunzhi and Kangxi emperors, and then evolved into a pattern. There were 53 cases of literary persecution during the reign of the Qianlong Emperor. Between 1772 and 1793, there was an effort by the Qianlong Emperor to purge what he considered to be evil books, poems, and plays. He set out to get rid of works by Ming loyalists who he believed were writing subversive anti-Qing histories of the Manchu conquest. The scale of the destruction cause by this "literary holocaust" is uncertain due to gaps in the imperial archives, however as many as 3,000 works may have been lost. An estimated 151,723 volumes were destroyed by the inquisition in this period. Amongst the works subject to this treatment were books considered disrespectful towards the Qing emperors or previous ethnic minority dynasties that could be viewed as analogous to the Qing. From 1780 onwards, plays could also be destroyed if they were vulgar or contained anti-Manchu material. Writers who criticised the Qing dynasty could expect to have their entire work erased, regardless of content. The inquisition was often used to express local ambitions and rivalries that had little to do with the ruler's own political interests. It thus generated interclass, as well as intraclass, warfare. For example, commoners could lay charges against scholars.

In 1799, Emperor Jiaqing announced that treating literary inquisition cases as the same level as treason and rebellion was legally unjust and inappropriate, and ordered previous cases to be reviewed. In this way, he ended the era of extensive literary inquisitions under Emperor Kangxi, Yongzheng and Qianlong that lasted nearly 150 years.

=== Examples ===
- 1661 to 1663: The Ming History case, the first famous case of literary inquisition in Qing dynasty. The Qing government took many issues with an unofficial history of Ming. Writers of this history, as well as some people related to the writers, (70 people in all) were executed. Among the issues were:
  - Referring to ancestors of the Qing Emperors with impolite names.
  - Referring to the ancestors of Qing Emperors as “贼” [bandit] and the armies of Qing as “夷” [derogatory word, roughly "foreign barbarian"].
- 1753: The Qianlong Emperor's frequent tours of Jiangnan were partly funded by local governments, and therefore indirectly by the local people. One local official by the name of Lu Lusen, using a higher ranking minister's name, Sun Jiajin, sent a memorial to the emperor, pleading with him to stop the tour for the sake of the local people. The text achieved widespread popular support. Eventually Lu Lusen was sentenced to death by slow slicing for sedition, his two sons were beheaded, and more than a thousand relatives and acquaintances were either executed, exiled, or thrown into jail according to the notion of "collective responsibility" that automatically applied in cases of sedition.
- 1755: A Provincial Education Commissioner named Hu Zhongzao (胡中藻) wrote a poem in which the character qing 清, the name of the dynasty (but also meaning "clear" or "transparent"), was preceded by zhuo (浊), which means "murky" or "muddy". The Qianlong Emperor saw this and many other formulations as the taking of a position in the factional struggle that was taking place at the time between the Han Chinese official Zhang Tingyu and the Manchu official Ertai, who had been Hu's mentor. Hu was eventually beheaded.
- 1778: The son of a poet from Jiangsu called Xu Shukui (徐述夔) had written a poem to celebrate his late father. The Qianlong Emperor decided that the poem was derogatory towards the Manchus, and ordered that Xu Shukui's coffin be unearthed, his corpse mutilated, and his children and grandchildren who were over 16 beheaded. His grandsons under 15 were spared and made slaves of officials.
- Cai Xian (蔡顯) wrote a poem No colour is true except for red, alien flowers have become the kings of flowers to show that he preferred red peonies over purple peonies, and stated that the 'red peony is the king of peonies' and 'peonies of other colours are aliens'. The family name of the Ming emperors is Zhū (朱), which also means 'red' in Chinese. The Qianlong Emperor then accused Cai Xian of attempting to attack the Manchus by innuendo and ordered Cai's execution.
- In 1730, Xu Jun wrote a poem 清風不識字，何故亂翻書 [The clear [Qing] winds cannot read, so why do they flip the book pages?] This was interpreted as insinuating that the Manchu rulers of Qing were illiterate. For this and similar poems, he was executed.

== See also ==
- Human rights in China
- Index Librorum Prohibitorum
- Political repression
- Oprichnina, Ivan the Terrible's Russian Tsardom, 1565-1572 A.D
- Treason by the Book
