= The Deer and the Cauldron =

1969–1972 novel by Jin Yong

- Cover of the 1980 edition
- Author: Jin Yong
- Original title: 鹿鼎記
- Translator: John Minford (English, highly abridged)
- Language: Chinese
- Genre: Wuxia; Historical fiction
- Publisher: Ming Pao
- Publication date: 23 September 1972
- Publication place: Hong Kong
- Media type: Print
- ISBN: 9786263619524
- Preceded by: Sword Stained with Royal Blood
- Followed by: A Deadly Secret

The Deer and the Cauldron
- Traditional Chinese: 鹿鼎記
- Simplified Chinese: 鹿鼎记
- Literal meaning: Tale of the Deer and the Cauldron
Transcriptions
Standard Mandarin
- Hanyu Pinyin: Lù Dǐng Jì
Yue: Cantonese
- Jyutping: Luk^{6} Ding^{2} Gei^{3}

The Deer and the Cauldron (鹿鼎記), also known as The Duke of Mount Deer or The Royal Tramp, is a wuxia–historical novel by Jin Yong (Louis Cha). It is his last and longest novel, originally serialised in the Hong Kong newspaper Ming Pao from 24 October 1969 to 23 September 1972.

== Title ==
The novel's title is explained in the first chapter when the poet Lü Liuliang discusses two concepts with his son. The cauldron is a reference to a story in the Zuo Zhuan in which King Zhuang of Chu enquired the weight of the Nine Tripod Cauldrons – revealing his secret desire to seize the Mandate of Heaven. The deer is a reference to a remark by Kuai Tong recorded in the Records of the Grand Historian: "the Qin emperor lost his deer, and all under heaven chased after it". The deer symbolises the common people of China, who are at the mercy of ruthless warlords vying to conquer the lands of the fallen Qin dynasty.

As Lü explains to his son, in Chinese history, the cauldron has been used both to cook hunted deer and as an instrument of torture for human beings. In the Chinese language, "asking about the cauldrons" (問鼎) and "chasing the deer" (逐鹿) metaphorically refer to one's desire to be the Emperor, while "not knowing who will kill the deer" (鹿死誰手) indicates uncertainty about who will eventually become the Emperor. "It may be uncertain who will kill the deer, but the deer gets killed all right. There's no uncertainty about that."

In the afterword, Jin Yong wrote that his intention in writing the novel was to reflect societal and cultural realities instead of encouraging readers to imitate an unprincipled protagonist. In a 2006 interview, Jin Yong revealed that he considered changing the novel's ending to give Wei Xiaobao his just deserts, but he abandoned the idea after receiving pushback from readers.

== Plot ==
The story follows a witty, sly, illiterate, and lazy protagonist, Wei Xiaobao, who was born in a brothel in Yangzhou in the mid-17th century during the Qing dynasty. By chance, the teenage scamp helps an outlaw evade the authorities and follows him to Beijing. In the capital, Wei is kidnapped and taken to the imperial palace, where, in order to survive, he impersonates an eunuch and strikes up an unlikely friendship with the young Kangxi Emperor.

One day, Wei encounters the Tiandihui, a secret society aiming to overthrow the Qing dynasty and restore the Ming dynasty. He impresses Chen Jinnan, the Tiandihui's leader and an advisor to the Kingdom of Tungning in Taiwan, who takes him as an apprentice and teaches him martial arts. Wei also becomes one of the Tiandihui's branch leaders and agrees to serve as their spy in the palace. Later, he is taken captive by the sinister Mystic Dragon Cult and taken to their island base. Through glib talk and flattery, he wins the favour of the cult leader Hong Antong and his young wife Su Quan, becoming one of the cult's five emissaries.

Wei makes a number of seemingly impossible achievements through sheer luck, cunning, and the use of unglamorous means such as cheating and deception. First, he assists the Kangxi Emperor in ousting the autocratic regent Oboi from power. Second, he discovers the whereabouts of the missing Shunzhi Emperor, who has been presumed dead, saves him from danger and reunites him with his son, the Kangxi Emperor. Third, he eliminates the Mystic Dragon Cult by stirring up internal conflict, which leads to the cult's self-destruction. Fourth, he weakens Wu Sangui's rebellion by bribing the rebels' allies to withdraw, allowing Qing imperial forces to crush the rebels easily. Finally, he leads a campaign against the Tsardom of Russia and helps the Qing Empire reach a border treaty with the Russians. Earlier on, he had met the Russian regent, Sophia Alekseyevna, and helped her consolidate control over Russia during an uprising. In the process of accomplishing these tasks, he also recommends talents to serve the Qing government, one of whom is Shi Lang, the admiral who leads the successful naval campaign against Taiwan.

Throughout the story, Wei exhibits devout loyalty to both the Kangxi Emperor and the Tiandihui. He saves the lives of the emperor and the empress dowager on several occasions. On the other hand, he helps the Tiandihui by undermining attempts by Qing imperial forces to destroy the Tiandihui. Navigating power plays, Wei accumulates immense wealth and receives titles of nobility from the emperor, including "Duke of Deer Cauldron" (or "Duke of Mount Deer", which is used as an alternative English title for the novel). On top of his achievements, he encounters seven attractive women on separate occasions, eventually marrying all of them and having three children.

Wei's conflicting loyalties ultimately reach a disastrous conclusion. The Kangxi Emperor discovers his affiliation with the Tiandihui, forcing him to choose to either remain loyal to the Qing Empire or become an enemy of the state. Wei faces a dilemma: If he chooses to follow the emperor's orders, he will have to betray his friends in the Tiandihui and help the emperor destroy them; if he refuses, he faces the possibility of death and the extermination of his family. Although he ultimately chooses to go into exile, the emperor still regards him as a close friend and loyal subject so he pardons him and allows him to return to the palace.

Towards the end of the novel, the emperor tries to force Wei to help him eliminate the Tiandihui again. On the other hand, Wei faces an even bigger problem with the Tiandihui. As Chen Jinnan had died recently, the Tiandihui members look up to Wei and want him to be their new leader.

Wei ponders the issue, realises that he will never be able to reconcile between the two opposing sides, and feels that his divided friendships and split loyalties are tearing him apart. He decides to leave and take his family and immense wealth along with him to lead a reclusive life. He is never seen again. It is said that when the Kangxi Emperor went on six inspection tours to the Jiangnan region throughout his reign, his true purpose was to search for Wei.

== Miscellaneous information ==
=== Sutra of Forty-two Chapters ===
The pioneers of the Qing dynasty made eight copies of the Sutra of Forty-two Chapters, a classical Buddhist text. After their conquest of China, they looted large amounts of treasure and transported them to a secret location in northeast China. The map to that location was torn into several pieces and hidden in the eight books separately. Each book was given to one of the Eight Banners for safekeeping.

To protect the treasure, the Eight Banners' commanders were not told about the treasure vault. Instead, they were told that the books contained a secret leading to a location containing the "Dragon's Pulse", the spiritual foundation of the Qing dynasty. If it is disturbed, it will bring about the dynasty's downfall. This is to ensure that none of the nobles will attempt to find this location; they will instead guard the secret with their lives. Only the reigning emperor knows the truth, as shown when the Shunzhi Emperor passes on this knowledge to the Kangxi Emperor.

The books are sought by many, including Hai Dafu, Mao Dongzhu, the Mystic Dragon Cult, the Heaven and Earth Society, the former Princess Changping, Wu Sangui and others. Some of them know the truth about the treasure while others wish to end the Qing dynasty. Wei Xiaobao collects the eight books and pieces the map together. He finds the treasure at Mount Deer Cauldron in Heilongjiang, but does not seize it for himself.

==== The eight books ====
Order of appearance	Banner	Initial holder	Description
1	Plain White Banner	Suksaha	Oboi seized the book from Suksaha after executing him. The book was confiscated along with Oboi's possessions after Oboi's downfall and ends up with Mao Dongzhu. Wei Xiaobao steals it from a secret compartment in Mao Dongzhu's room.
2	Bordered Yellow Banner	Oboi	The book was confiscated along with Oboi's possessions after Oboi's downfall and ends up with Mao Dongzhu. Wei Xiaobao steals it from a secret compartment in Mao Dongzhu's room.
3	Plain Red Banner	Prince Kang	Qi Yuankai stole it from Prince Kang's residence. Wei Xiaobao later finds it hidden under a roof tile.
4	Bordered Red Banner	Hechabo	Mao Dongzhu sent Ruidong to steal it from Hechabo. Wei Xiaobao kills Ruidong later and takes the book from him.
5	Bordered White Banner	Unknown	The book was confiscated from the banner commander by the Shunzhi Emperor, who gave it to Consort Donggo. Mao Dongzhu later killed Consort Donggo and took the book from her. Wei Xiaobao eventually steals it from a secret compartment in Mao Dongzhu's room.
6	Plain Yellow Banner	Shunzhi Emperor	The Shunzhi Emperor gave Wei Xiaobao the book and told him to pass it to the Kangxi Emperor. The book is then stolen by Princess Jianning but is taken away by Jiunan, who returns it to Wei Xiaobao.
7	Bordered Blue Banner	Eshuoke	The book was taken away by the Thin Monk, who accidentally leaves it behind in Mao Dongzhu's room. Wei Xiaobao finds it and keeps it for himself.
8	Plain Blue Banner	Jiakun	The book ends up in Wu Sangui's possession when Jiakun is killed in battle in Yunnan. Wei Xiaobao steals it and replaces it with the Bordered Blue Banner's copy.

=== Literary inquisition ===
In the early years of the reign of the Kangxi Emperor, the regent Oboi monopolised state power and introduced the practice of literary inquisition. Many intellectuals and scholars were persecuted for their writings. Zhuang Tinglong, a merchant from Huzhou, sponsored the publication of an unauthorised book about the history of the Ming dynasty. The book used the Ming emperors' era names, which were considered taboo during the Qing dynasty. Wu Zhirong found out and reported it to the authorities.

Zhuang Tinglong and his family were persecuted and the male members of the Zhuang family were killed. The incident also sparked off a chain reaction, in which several individuals who were not directly involved or linked to the book were similarly rounded up and executed. These individuals included scholars who helped to write and proofread the book, bookstore owners who sold copies of the book, distant relatives of the Zhuang family, and even people who had contact with readers of the book.

== Reception ==
The Deer and the Cauldron, even among fans of Jin Yong's novels, has divided critical opinions mainly due to the character of Wei Xiaobao. Ni Kuang argued that The Deer and the Cauldron was "the best novel of all time, Chinese or foreign". Wong Kwok-pun of the Chinese University of Hong Kong felt that it was an inferior work compared to the "masterpieces" of the Condor Trilogy and expressed surprise that John Minford chose to translate an abridged version of it.

== Abridged English language translation ==
The Deer and the Cauldron has been translated in highly abridged form (28 chapters) into English by John Minford and David Hawkes. The translation was published by the Oxford University Press in three volumes from 1997 to 2002.

== Works based on the novel ==
There are books which examine the office politics displayed by the main characters and their applications in real life.

- Situational Perspectives in The Deer and the Cauldron (情境鹿鼎记), ISBN 7-80207-108-9
- Wei Xiaobao the CEO (总裁韦小宝), ISBN 7-80673-728-6
- Interpreting Wei Xiaobao (破译韦小宝), ISBN 7-5048-4705-4
- Miscellaneous Essays on Wei Xiaobao (串烤韦小宝), ISBN 7-80661-929-1
- Streetwise Wei Xiaobao's Secrets of Survival (人精韦小宝的混世法宝) ISBN 7-80100-576-7

== Adaptations ==
=== Films ===
Year	Production	Main cast	Additional information
1983	Shaw Brothers Studio (Hong Kong)	Wong Yue, Gordon Liu	See Tale of a Eunuch
1992	Hong Kong	Stephen Chow, Sharla Cheung, Ng Man-tat, Natalis Chan, Sandra Ng, Chingmy Yau, Damian Lau, Brigitte Lin, Deric Wan	See Royal Tramp
1992	Hong Kong	Stephen Chow, Sharla Cheung, Ng Man-tat, Natalis Chan, Sandra Ng, Chingmy Yau, Damian Lau, Brigitte Lin, Deric Wan	See Royal Tramp II
1993	Hong Kong	Tony Leung, Veronica Yip, Dicky Cheung, Kent Tong	See Hero – Beyond the Boundary of Time
2011	Chinese Entertainment Shanghai (Mainland China)	Hu Ge, Nicky Wu, Cecilia Liu, Lin Gengxin, Annie Liu	An online short film, Chinese title 夢迴鹿鼎記.

=== Television ===
Year	Production	Main cast	Additional information
1978	CTV (Hong Kong)	Wen Hsueh-erh, Cheng Si-chun	
1984	TVB (Hong Kong)	Tony Leung, Andy Lau, Carina Lau, Sandra Ng, Kiki Sheung, Teresa Mo	See The Duke of Mount Deer (1984 Hong Kong TV series)
1984	CTV (Taiwan)	Li Hsiao-fei, Chou Shao-tung, Chen Yu-mei, Chou Ming-hui, Ying Hsiao-wei, Lam Sau-kwan, Pei Hsin-yu, Cheng Hsueh-lin	See The Duke of Mount Deer (1984 Taiwanese TV series)
1998	TVB (Hong Kong)	Jordan Chan, Steven Ma, Rain Lau, Cherie Chan, Vivien Leung, Michelle Fung, Hilary Tsui, Chan On-kei, May Kwong	See The Duke of Mount Deer (1998 TV series)
2001	Upland Films (Hong Kong); GTV (Taiwan)	Dicky Cheung, Patrick Tam, Ruby Lin, Annie Wu, Athena Chu, Teresa Mak, Monica Chan, Shu Qi, Jess Zhang	See The Duke of Mount Deer (2000 TV series)
2008	Huayi Brothers; Beijing Cathay Media Ltd. (Mainland China)	Huang Xiaoming, Wallace Chung, Cherrie Ying, He Zhuoyan, Shu Chang, Liu Zi, Liu Yun, Hu Ke, Li Fei'er	See Royal Tramp (TV series)
2014	Zhejiang Huace Film & TV Production (Mainland China)	Han Dong, Wei Qianxiang, Lemon Zhang, Jia Qing, Zhao Yuanyuan, Viann Zhang, Lou Yixiao	See The Deer and the Cauldron (2014 TV series)
2020	New Classics Media (Mainland China)	Zhang Yishan, Zhang Tianyang, Tang Yixin, Yang Qiru, Rebecca Wang, Guo Yang	

=== Radio ===
In 2000, Hong Kong's RTHK broadcast a 100 episodes radio drama based on the novel, with Eason Chan and Roland Leung voicing Wei Xiaobao and the Kangxi Emperor respectively.

=== Video games ===
- Role-playing video games:
  - 鹿鼎記 (智冠) (DOS) (Traditional Chinese)
  - 鹿鼎記 (歡樂盒)
  - 鹿鼎記II
  - Heroes of Jin Yong Online (金庸群侠传Online)
- Java ME games for mobile phones:
  - 情圣韦小宝
  - 韦小宝笑传
