= Empress Xiaohuizhang =

Empress of China from 1654 to 1661

- Empress Dowager Renxian
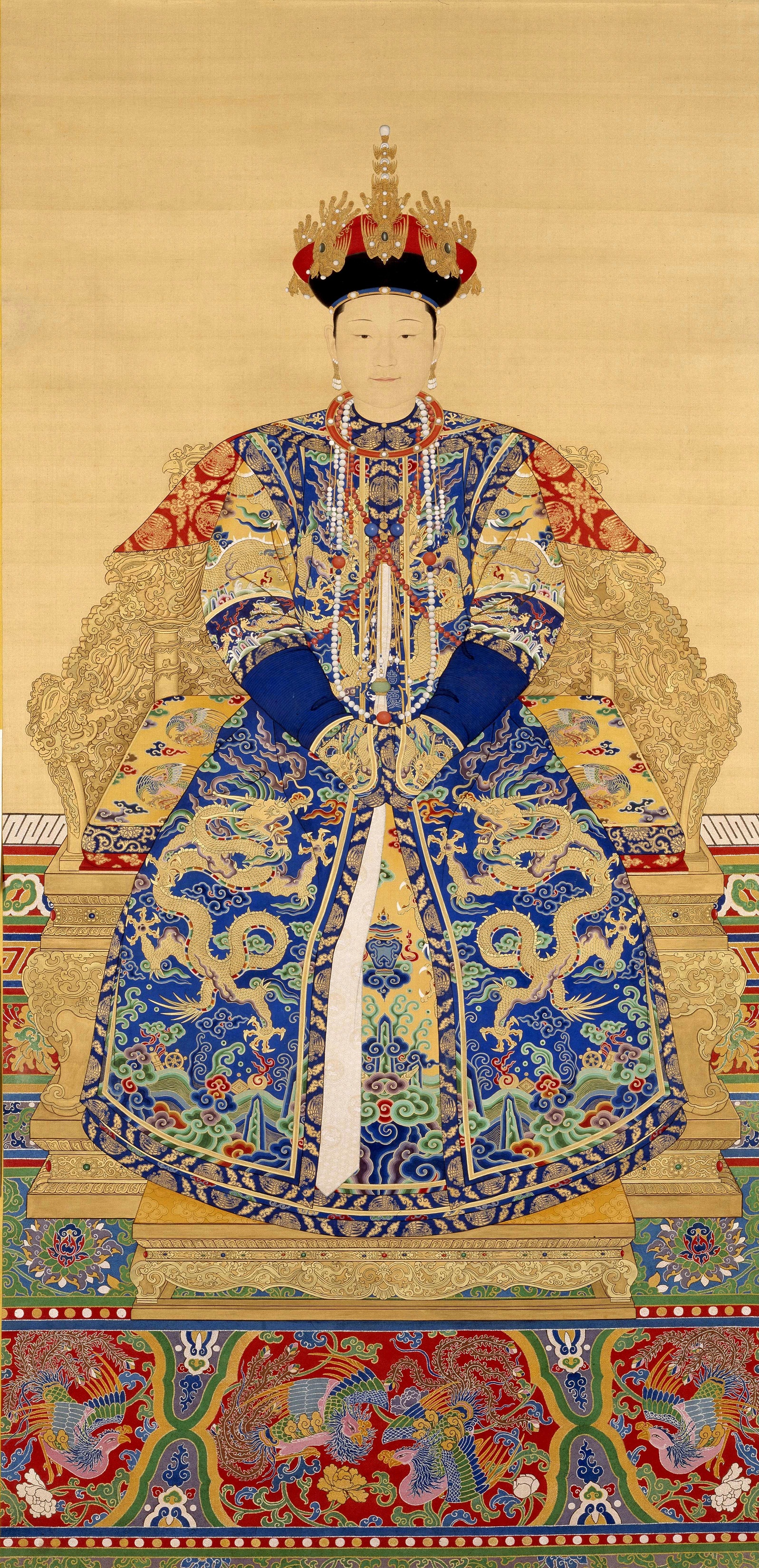
- Qing Dynasty portrait of Empress Xiaohuizhang

Empress consort of the Qing dynasty
- Tenure: July/August 1654 – 5 February 1661
- Predecessor: Empress Borjigit
- Successor: Empress Xiaochengren

Empress dowager of the Qing dynasty
- Tenure: 5 February 1661 – 7 January 1718
- Predecessor: Empress Dowager Zhaosheng
- Successor: Empress Dowager Renshou
- Born: Borjigit Altantsetseg (Алтанцэцэг) (博爾濟吉特 阿拉坦琪琪格); 5 November 1641 (崇德六年 十月 三日)
- Died: 7 January 1718 (aged 76) (康熙五十六年 十二月 六日); Ningshou Palace, Forbidden City
- Burial: Xiao Mausoleum, Eastern Qing tombs
- Spouse: Shunzhi Emperor (m. 1654; died 1661)
Names
- Borjigit Altantsetseg (博爾濟吉特 阿拉坦琪琪格)
Posthumous name
- Empress Xiaohui Renxian Duanyi Cishu Gong'an Chunde Shuntian Yisheng Zhang (孝惠仁憲端懿慈淑恭安純德順天翼聖章皇后)
- House: Borjigit (博爾濟吉特)
- Father: Chuo'erji
- Mother: Lady Aisin Gioro

Empress Xiaohuizhang

Chinese name
- Traditional Chinese: 孝惠章皇后
- Simplified Chinese: 孝惠章皇后
Transcriptions
Standard Mandarin
- Hanyu Pinyin: Xiàohuìzhāng Huánghòu

Manchu name
- Manchu script: ᡥᡳᠶᠣᠣᡧᡠᠩᡤᠠ ᡶᡠᠯᡝᡥᡠᠨ ᡝᠯᡩᡝᠮᠪᡠᡥᡝ ᡥᡡᠸᠠᠩᡥᡝᠣ
- Romanization: hiyoošungga fulehun eldembuhe hūwangheo

Empress Xiaohuizhang (5 November 1641 – 7 January 1718), of the Khorchin Mongol Borjigit clan, was the wife and second empress consort of Fulin, the Shunzhi Emperor. She was empress consort of Qing from 1654 until her husband's death in 1661, after which she was honoured as Empress Dowager Renxian during the reign of her step-son, Xuanye, the Kangxi Emperor. She was posthumously honoured with the title Empress Xiaohuizhang.

== Life ==
=== Family background ===
- Father: Chuo'erji (绰尔济; d. 1670), held the title of a third rank prince (貝勒)
  - Paternal grandfather: Chahan (查罕), held the title of a third rank prince (貝勒)
  - Paternal great aunt: Primary consort Minhui (1609–1641)
  - Paternal great aunt: Empress Xiaozhuangwen (1613–1688), the mother of the Shunzhi Emperor (1638–1661)
- Mother: Lady Aisin Gioro
  - Maternal grandfather: Abatai (1589–1646)
- Seven brothers
- Two elder sisters and two younger sisters
  - Fourth younger sister: Consort Shuhui (1642–1713)

=== Chongde era ===
Lady Borjigit was born on the third day of the tenth lunar month in the 16th year of the reign of Hong Taiji, which translates to 5 November 1641 in the Gregorian calendar.

=== Shunzhi era ===
On 25 October 1653, the Shunzhi Emperor deposed his first empress consort, Erdeni Bumba, who was also from the Borjigit clan. In June or July 1654, Altantsetseg entered the Forbidden City and became a concubine of the Shunzhi Emperor. In July or August 1654, she was officially designated as the empress to replace the deposed Erdeni Bumba.

However, the Shunzhi Emperor showed little interest in his new empress consort because he favoured Consort Donggo more than any other consort of his. Some historians believe that the Shunzhi Emperor made Altantsetseg his new empress consort because he wanted to reduce tensions between the Aisin Gioro and Borjigit clans after demoting his first empress consort. The Aisin Gioro and Borjigit clans had a long history of political marriages, so the emperor had to choose a Borjigit woman to be his empress consort in order to keep up with tradition.

=== Kangxi era ===
The Shunzhi Emperor died on 5 February 1661 and was succeeded by his third son, Xuanye, who was born to Lady Tunggiya. Xuanye was enthroned as the Kangxi Emperor, while Alatan Qiqige, as the empress consort of the previous emperor, was granted the title "Empress Dowager Renxian". She died on 7 January 1718 and was interred in a separate tomb in the Xiao Mausoleum of the Eastern Qing tombs.

== Titles ==
- During the reign of Hong Taiji (r. 1626–1643):
  - Lady Borjigit (from 5 November 1641)
- During the reign of the Shunzhi Emperor (r. 1643–1661):
  - Empress (皇后; from July/August 1654)
- During the reign of the Kangxi Emperor (r. 1661–1722):
  - Empress Dowager Renxian (仁憲皇太后; from 5 February 1661)
  - Empress Xiaohuizhang (孝惠章皇后; from 1718)

== In fiction and popular culture ==
- Portrayed by Wang Ge in Xiaozhuang Mishi (2003)
- Portrayed by Yang Mingna in Chronicle of Life (2016)
- Portrayed by Wang Xiu Zhu in The Deer and the Cauldron (2020)

== See also ==
- Ranks of imperial consorts in China § Qing
- Royal and noble ranks of the Qing dynasty

== Notes ==
Empress Xiaohuizhang House of Borjigin
Chinese royalty
Preceded by Erdeni Bumba, Empress of the Borjigit clan	Empress consort of China; July/August 1654 – 5 February 1661	Succeeded by Empress Xiaochengren of the Hešeri clan
Preceded by Bumbutai, Empress Dowager Zhaosheng (Xiaozhuangwen) of the Borjigit clan	Empress dowager of China; 5 February 1661 – 7 January 1718 with Empress Dowager Cihe (Xiaokangzhang) (1661–1663)	Succeeded by Empress Dowager Renshou (Xiaogongren) of the Uya clan
