= Princess Changping =

Chinese princess

Zhu Meichuo 朱媺娖
- Princess Kunxing (坤興公主)
- Born: 2 May 1630; Forbidden City, Beijing, Ming dynasty
- Died: 26 September 1647 (aged 17); Beijing, Qing dynasty
- Burial: 1647; Guang'anmen, Beijing
- Spouse: Zhou Xian
Posthumous name
- Princess Changping (conferred by the Qing)
- House: Zhu
- Father: Chongzhen Emperor
- Mother: Consort Shun of the Wang clan

Princess Changping
- Traditional Chinese: 長平公主
- Simplified Chinese: 长平公主
Transcriptions
Standard Mandarin
- Hanyu Pinyin: Chángpíng Gōngzhǔ

Zhu Meichuo
- Chinese: 朱媺娖
Transcriptions
Standard Mandarin
- Hanyu Pinyin: Zhū Měichuò

Princess Changping (c. 1630 – c. 1647) was a Chinese princess of the Ming dynasty. She was the elder daughter of the Chongzhen Emperor and Consort Shun of the Wang clan, but was raised by Empress Zhou after her mother died.

Her personal name is not recorded in the official History of Ming, which refers to her only as Princess Changping. The name Zhu Meichuo is widely circulated in later accounts, but its historical authenticity remains uncertain.

== Biography ==
Princess Changping was born around 1630 to the Chongzhen Emperor and Consort Shun of the Wang clan. Changping had 2 sisters, Princess Kunyi and Princess Zhaoren, and 6 brothers: Prince Daoliang, Zhu Cican, Zhu Cizhao, Zhu Cilang, Zhu Cihuan, and Zhu Cijiong. From a young age, Changping was known for her ingenuity. She took interest in poetry and literature, and also grew skilled in cooking and needlework.

In 1644, her father arranged for her marriage to Zhou Xian (周顯; a.k.a. Zhou Shixian 周世顯), a military officer. However, their wedding was cancelled as Li Zicheng and his rebel army advanced toward the capital Beijing. As the imperial defences failed and the capital fell to the rebels, the emperor decided to kill his own family, fearing that their fate would mirror that of the last Song dynasty imperial family, where the princesses were tortured to death or enslaved as prostitutes.

Changping at one point found Empress Zhou’s dead body at a temple, having been ordered to commit suicide by her father. While crying and holding her mother's dress, her father came in the room, shouting at her, “Why must you be born in this family?" He then attacked her with his sword, cutting off her left arm. Changping fainted from blood loss, but was saved by a eunuch. Nobody thought that she would survive, but she regained consciousness five days later, and found out that her father had committed suicide by hanging himself on a tree in front of the Forbidden City, marking the end of the Zhu family imperial lineage and the Ming dynasty.

In 1645, Changping asked the Shunzhi Emperor of the new Qing dynasty for permission to become a Buddhist nun. The emperor refused and arranged for her to marry Zhou Xian. Changping and Zhou Xian were said to have had a happy, respectful marriage. However, in 1647, while pregnant, Princess Changping fell ill and died, aged 16 or 17.

== In popular culture ==
Changping had a greater impact in later folklore and popular culture than in history, with many stories telling of her miraculous survival of her father’s sword.

The popular Cantonese opera The Flower Princess (Chinese: 帝女花; pinyin: dì nǚ huā; Jyutping: dai3 neoi5 faa1) features her and her beloved husband Zhou Xian as its protagonists. Based on its first script and other publications, the first adaption debuted in 1957 at the Lee Theatre. The opera was the basis for two film adaptations, Tragedy of the Emperor's Daughter (1959) directed by Wong Tin-lam and Princess Chang Ping (1976) directed by John Woo.

In 1981, ATV Home adapted the play into a television drama titled Princess Cheung Ping (Chinese: 武侠帝女花), in a wuxia setting, starring Damian Lau, Michelle Yim and David Chiang. In 2003, TVB produced Perish in the Name of Love, a television series loosely based on the original play. Steven Ma and Charmaine Sheh starred in the leading roles.

A known tale about her tells that Changping became a nun after the fall of the Ming dynasty. She practiced martial arts and became a leader of the resistance movement against the Qing dynasty. She was nicknamed "One-Armed Divine Nun" (獨臂神尼) for her formidable martial art skills. One of her disciples was Lü Siniang (呂四娘), the heroine who assassinated the Yongzheng Emperor in folklore.

Changping also appears as a major character in Louis Cha's novel Sword Stained with Royal Blood. She is called A'jiu in the novel and has a romantic relationship with the protagonist, Yuan Chengzhi. However at the end of the novel, after losing an arm and with her coming back to life, she decides to become a nun and she changes her name to Jiunan.

Also, she has a minor role in The Deer and the Cauldron, another of Louis Cha's novels that is regarded as an unofficial sequel to Sword Stained With Royal Blood. In The Deer and the Cauldron, Jiunan becomes a martial arts teacher to the protagonist, Wei Xiaobao.

== See also ==
- History of Ming, volume 121 (明史列傳第九)
- Di Nü Hua, fictional Chinese story
- Sword Stained with Royal Blood, wuxia novel
- The Deer and the Cauldron, wuxia novel
