= Iquan's Party =

Fictional merchant company

Iquan's Party (Chinese: 一官黨) is the name of an armed merchant company led by Zheng Zhilong (also known by his baptismal name Nicholas Iquan Gaspard) that appears in the novel The chronicles of Zheng Zhilong. Although Zheng Zhilong was a real person the company as it is portrayed in the novel is fictional and not an actual historical organisation.

According to the book Iquan's Party was the Zheng clan's trading fleet, which in general referred to Zheng Zhilong's armed merchant enterprise, more specifically this was made up of the Five Mountain Merchants and Five Seas Merchants responsible for trade, Zheng's household forces (Chinese: 鄭家軍) and an intelligence division known as the Hongmen Tiandihui (Chinese: 洪門天地會).

== Development ==
=== Early period ===
Initially Iquan's Party was a simple trading enterprise plying the Japan-China Southeast Asian trade routes. In addition it operated a business providing security to trading ships, ships that had paid a protection fee would fly a flag indicating that protection. The enterprise was initially led by Li Dan who was a leader of the Chinese merchant community in Japan, at this time Zheng Zhilong was the youngest member of the Society of the Twenty Eight Brothers. By 1625 Zheng Zhilong had become the leader of a group of eighteen birth and oath brothers known as the Eighteen Zhis (so called because all eighteen shared Zhi as a generational name).

=== Middle period ===
During this period Zheng temporarily left the organisation, turning to outright piracy in Taiwan under Yan Siqi. When this pirate grouping dissolved some of its members continued to follow Zheng Zhilong, this becoming the core of his personal navy.

=== Late period ===
Later, in 1628, Zheng accepted the authority of the Ming government, the Eighteen Zhis splitting into pro and anti Ming factions. From this time onwards Zheng worked to suppress smuggling, apprehending even those who in previous days were oath brothers, at one time presenting to the court papers relating to "The arrest of Zhengyi Guan by Zheng Zhilong" documents created to show that he had washed his hands of his previous life of brigandage.

Militarily in addition to expanding his existing naval forces, Zheng created land forces. However, because official resources were lacking, Zheng's army were closer to being household retainers rather than of being true professional soldiers; their role being to protect the group's trade by providing security both at sea and ashore. Income from the group's trade activities went back into the maintenance of its military, the relationship with the government being similar to modern outsourced private military contracts rather than being part of the official Ming military.

Iquan's Party would be inherited by Koxinga, and under his leadership the development of the trade arm of the organisation would become ever more intricate whilst the military arm was effectively unified. Koxinga founded the Kingdom of Tungning with these forces.

They fought in the Sino-Dutch conflicts in the Battle of Liaoluo Bay and Siege of Fort Zeelandia.

== See also ==
- Red seal ships
- Wokou

== Notes ==
1. Here the Chinese (黨) has been taken to mean party, however other translations of the word include group or grouping, clique and, maybe more appropriately in this case, gang.
