= Tagawa Matsu =

Mother of Southern Ming general Koxinga (1602–1647)

Lady Tagawa
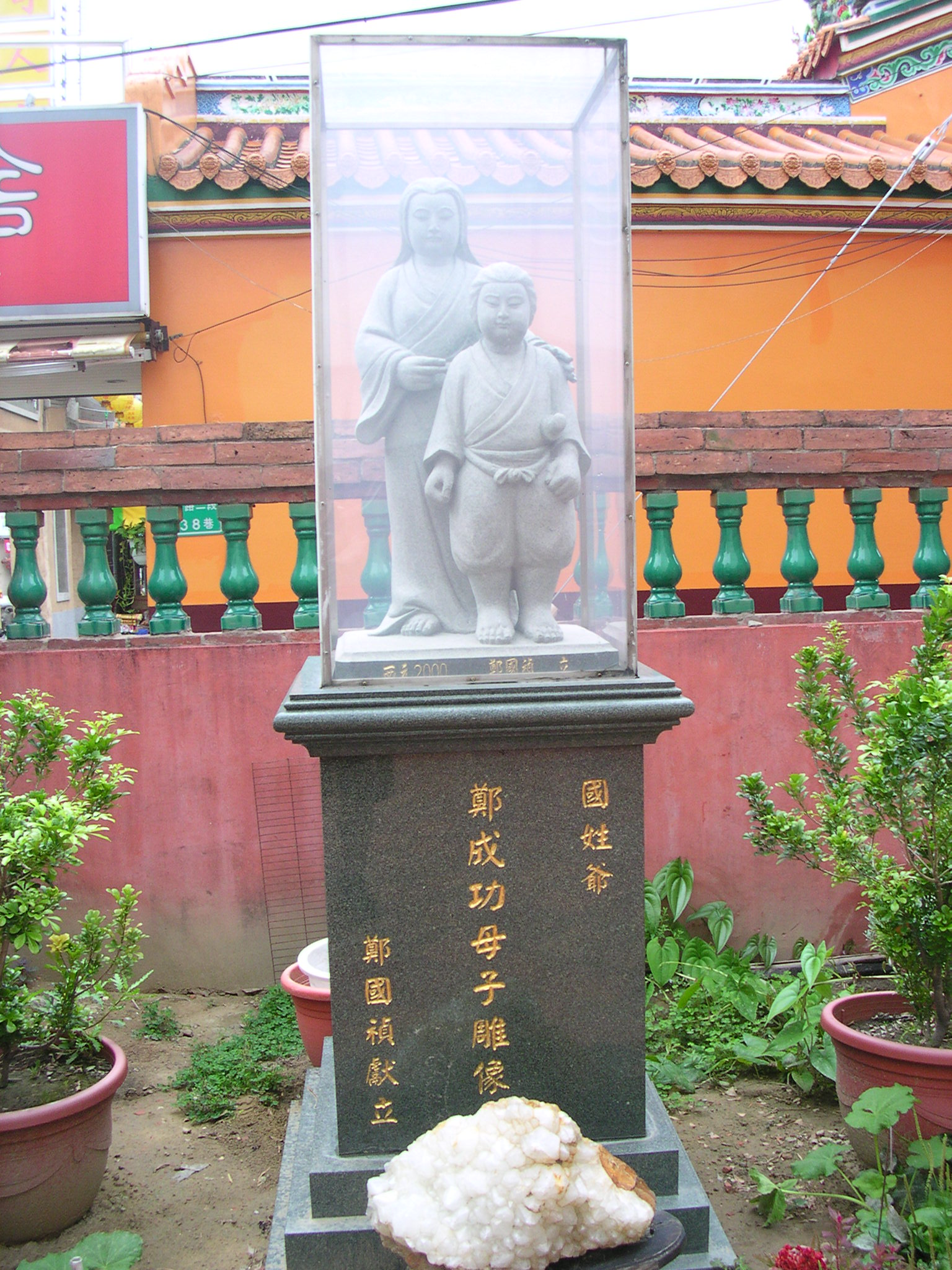
- Tagawa Matsu and young Koxinga (Koxinga Ancestral Shrine, Tainan, Taiwan)
- Born: October 3, 1601; Hirado, Tokugawa shogunate, Japan
- Died: January 5, 1647 (aged 45); Anping (now called Anhai), Fujian, Southern Ming dynasty, China
- Spouse: Zheng Zhilong
- Children: Koxinga, Shichizaemon
- Parent(s): Tagawa Shichizaemon (father); Weng Yihuang (step-father)

Tagawa Matsu (田川マツ; 1601–1647) or Weng-shi (翁氏), was the Japanese mother of Southern Ming general Zheng Chenggong, who is better known internationally as Koxinga. She was a daughter of Tagawa Shichizaemon (田川七左衛門), a vassal samurai of Hirado Domain, but later became the stepdaughter/adopted child to an immigrant Chinese blacksmith. She married Chinese merchant Zheng Zhilong and lived most of her life in the coastal town of Kawachiura (modern day Hirado) in Kyushu, and later died of honor suicide against a Qing attack after migrating to Fujian, China.

== Giving birth by the stone ==
Tagawa Matsu was a Japanese woman from a samurai family in Hirado. Tagawa met and married a Han Chinese Hoklo named Zheng Zhilong from Nan'an, Fujian, China who frequently traded with the Japanese in Hirado. They fell in love with each other and married.

Zheng Zhilong was said to be "very good looking" and when he first came to Japan he was 18 years old.

Tagawa was a few years older than Zheng and was in her early twenties when they met. There are different accounts of how they met. In one of them, she, along with other Japanese girls from samurai families, was waiting on the Daimyō Matsuura at an evening party when she met Zheng. The meeting may have been deliberately arranged by Matsuura or her parents to help marry her off to a foreigner. In another account, Zheng met Tagawa while talking to girls at the beach in Hirado. In another, Tagawa, an ashigaru's daughter, was given to him by the daimyō.

Another account by Liu Xianting in Guangyang Zaji (廣陽雜記) said that Tagawa was a widow when she met Zheng. It said that Zheng Zhilong fled to Japan when he was young and worked as a tailor. He lost his life savings of three coppers on a road and was looking for them but couldn't find them. He started crying but a Japanese widow who was standing inside the gate of her house saw him and asked him what was wrong. Zheng Zhilong told her and then she said to him "With your skill, you could easily make 3 million coppers, how could you arrive at this situation over 3 coppers?" She then invited Zheng to spend the night with her and they gave themselves to each other.

Tagawa gave birth to Koxinga during a trip with her husband when she was collecting seashells on the Senli Beach, Sennai River Bank (川內浦千里濱), Hirado. She gave him the Japanese name Fukumatsu. Zheng Zhilong gave him the Chinese name Zheng Sen; his name was later changed to Zheng Chenggong and he was granted the title Koxinga.

The stone beside which she gave birth still exists today as the Koxinga Child Birth Stone Tablet (鄭成功兒誕石碑), which is 80-cm tall and 3-metre wide, and submerged during high tides.

According to legend, there was a whale washing ashore and a storm was he was born.

Being in her early twenties, and being older than Zheng Zhilong, there is a possibility that Tagawa was a widow before she met Zheng, since it was unusual for a woman to not be married by this age. Tagawa was the first woman Zheng fell in love with, and they were viewed as having a common-law marriage already. However, the group of traders working with Captain China wanted to arrange for a Chinese woman, Lady Yan, to marry Zheng Zhilong.

After the birth of Koxinga, Zheng Zhilong still sometimes visited Tagawa in Japan, according to sources from their time.

She had another son named Shichizaemon in 1629 and gave him her family's surname, Tagawa. Sources say that Zheng Zhilong was the father, and that he visited Hirado to impregnate her with Shichizayemon and that he received the surname Tagawa because he was adopted by Tagawa Matsu's parents, but others say that Shichizaemon was the product of an unknown Japanese man, which is why he was given Tagawa's surname rather than Zheng's. He became an ashigaru samurai. The Taiwan Waiji does not mention Shichizaemon. Louise Lux attributes both sons to Tagawa and Zheng Zhilong and says in 1624 he was 20 years old. "Japan Magazine: A Representative Monthly of Things Japanese, Volume 19" attributes both sons to Tagawa and Zheng Zhilong.

Tagawa Matsu raised Koxinga in Japan by herself until he was seven, and her closeness with her son is evident in some of the accomplishment and decisions Koxinga made in his adult life. Koxinga was sent to live with his father in China in 1630. The Taiwan Waiji (臺灣外記) says "every night he would face east and look to his mother, hiding his tears." Tagawa Matsu did not come because she did not want to abandon Shichizaemon and was not willing to send the younger Shichizaemon on the dangerous ship ride.

In 1645, she was reunited with Koxinga by moving to Quanzhou, Fujian. She moved to Anhai despite the Japanese ban on leaving.

In 1646, when Koxinga was away fighting the Manchu Qings, the city was invaded by the Manchus. Koxinga, upon hearing of the invasion, immediately returned to Quanzhou, only to discover that his mother had killed herself in a refusal to surrender to the Manchus. After this, Koxinga developed increasingly powerful antagonism with the Manchus.

She is said in one source to have killed herself by stabbing herself in the neck. Koxinga cried when he found out his mother died. The Japanese celebrate how Tagawa committed suicide while fighting and claim that the Manchus said "If the women of Japan are of such sort, what must the men be like?" and that the Manchus were afraid of Japanese because of her, and they would not want to fight Japanese men if Tagawa was what Japanese women were like. The Japanese play The Battles of Coxinga said "Even though she was a woman, she did not forget her old home, and paid reverence to the land that gave her birth. Until her last breath she thought of the honor of Japan." The Japanese claim she committed suicide while fighting and that she preferred "death" and had the "Yamato spirit" while what really occurred is unknown because of the many different versions offered from different sources. The Japanese Foreign Affairs association during World War II cited Tagawa as an example of a Japanese who had "the spirit of facing certain death in order to live up to a cherished cause".

The Qing being responsible for killing Tagawa was something Zheng Zhilong had to live with since he did not know the Qing were going to kill her. The Qing did not trust him because they were the ones who got Tagawa killed so he might turn against the Qing if they let him go. His Japanese blood is believed to be the cause for his violent propensity according to a Spanish missionary.

== Dispute over background ==
Tagawa's real first name is unknown and she is only known by her surname Tagawa in Japan and China. According to Japanese folklore in Hirado her name was Matsu.

=== Half-Chinese theory ===
In the Zheng family genealogy, Tagawa Matsu is recorded under the Sinicized name of Weng-shi. Some Chinese records indicated that this is because after she moved to Quanzhou, an old ironsmith neighbour, Weng Yihuang (翁翌皇), treated this foreigner newcomer like his own daughter.

There are a small number of Chinese sources mistaking Tagawa Matsu as Weng Yihuang's blood daughter, with a Japanese mother surnamed Tagawa. Chinese on Taiwan who seek to downplay Tagawa Matsu's Japanese identity accept this theory that she was the daughter of the Chinese Weng Yihuang and a Japanese Tagawa woman, making Koxinga only one fourth Japanese through one Japanese grandmother.

According to hearsay heard by Tatemori Kō, Tagawa Matsu was the daughter of a Japanese woman Tagawa and the Chinese swordsmith Weng (Ō in Japanese), Tagawa married Weng after the Hirado Daimyo had a sword forged for him by Weng after he went from China to Japan, and then the Tagawa woman and Weng had a daughter (Tagawa Matsu) who married Zheng Zhilong, according to the 1913 book Shu Seiko Den by Tatemori Ko. The Taiwan source "Free China Review" also claims this.

This is unlikely, as this would necessitate either Weng Yihuang moving to Japan (as he was an ironsmith, neither a sailor nor a trader) or the migration of the Tagawa women back and forth between the two nations (as traveling of women was restricted).

=== Adopted theory ===
Other sources say that Weng Yihuang was her stepfather, that Weng Yihuang married Tagawa Matsu's widowed Japanese mother after Tagawa Matsu's Japanese father died and adopted her as his stepdaughter.

=== Prostitute or Princess ===
The Zheng family's enemies attacked Tagawa by suggesting she was a Japanese prostitute Zheng Zhilong picked up, while Tagawa's Japanese descendants claim she was a descendant of the Japanese Imperial family. This traces her descent to Japan's 50th Emperor, Kammu Tenno, 19 generations from Tagawa Matsu through Taira no Shigemori and Tagawa Yazayemon 田川 弥左衛門. The English diplomat R. A. B Posonby-Fane pushed the theory that Tagawa was a Japanese woman from a high class Samurai background. It is agreed by modern historians that she was neither and that she was a Japanese girl from an average Samurai family, not of high rank and not a prostitute. There is no proof for either the accusation that she was a prostitute or the claim that she was of aristocratic descent. Donald Keene pointed out that there was a real marriage between Zheng Zhilong and Miss Tagawa despite Zheng also later marrying a Chinese woman, so she was not a prostitute or a courtesan.

=== Samurai ===
Japanese sources say she was full blooded Japanese. Japanese sources say that her samurai father was either Lord Matsuura's Samurai Tagawa Yazayemon or her father's name was Tagawa Shichizaemon whom she named her second son after. According to stories passed down by Japanese in Hirado, Tagawa Matsu's father was Tagawa Shichizaemon (田川七左衛門) whom she named her second son after.

The samurai Tagawa Yazayemon was an ashigaru according to Hirado folklore and there was nothing else describing him as that according to Inagaki. In Taiyo, an article was written by Matsui Nobuaki which said that Tagawa Yazayemon was not Tagawa Matsu's father but instead her father was Tagawa Shichizayemon.

Wong said he cannot link her to the Ashigaru or the Tagawa samurai family.

The Tokugawa Japanese Shogunate compiled work, the Account of the Keicho Era (Keicho shosetsu) says that "While Zhilong was initially in Hirado, he married a woman, née Tagawa of a samurai family."

== Descendants ==
In Koxinga Memorial Temple (鄭成功祠) in Tainan, Taiwan, Tagawa Matsu's ancestral tablet is placed in a chamber called the Shrine of Queen Dowager Weng (Chinese: 翁太妃祠; pinyin: Wēng Tàifēi Cí; lit. 'Shrine of Royal Consort/Queen Dowager Weng'). The title "queen dowager" is a posthumous title based on the princeship/kingship of Koxinga (Prince-King of Yanping Prefecture) in the Southern Ming Empire.

Tagawa's ancestral tablet was saved after the Qing attack.

Tagawa Matsu's descendants through Koxinga live in both mainland China and Taiwan and her descendants through Shichizaemon live in Japan. Her descendants through her great-grandson Zheng Keshuang served as Han Bannermen in Beijing until 1911 when the Xinhai revolution broke out and the Qing dynasty fell, after which they moved back to Anhai and Nan'an in southern Fujian in mainland China. They still live there to this day. Her descendants through her grandson Zheng Kuan live in Taiwan. Zheng Daoshun was the son of Shichizaemon and he adopted the Zheng surname.

The "Asiatic Society of Japan" said "It was five years after the birth of Tei Seikō [Koxinga] that his father [Zheng Zhilong] left for China and accepted the position of Commander-in-Chief of the Imperial forces. Soon after his departure, his wife gave birth to a second son who was named Shichizaemon" who spend his life wholly in Japan and did not develop the love for adventure and renown which made his elder brother so famous. " "The descendants of Shichizaemon served the Government for many years as interpreters of Chinese, and there reside to this day in Nagasaki certain Japanese who point with pride to their ancestor."

One of Tagawa's Chinese descendants, Zheng Xiaoxuan (鄭曉嵐) the father of Zheng Chouyu, fought against the Japanese invaders in the Second Sino-Japanese War. Zheng Chouyu (鄭愁予) was born in Shandong in mainland China in 1933 and called himself a "child of the resistance" against Japan and he became a refugee during the war, moving from place to place across China to avoid the Japanese. He moved to Taiwan in 1949 and focuses his work on building stronger ties between Taiwan and mainland China. Zheng Chouyu was born in mainland China, he identified as Chinese and he felt alienated after he was forced to move to Taiwan in 1949 which was previously under Japanese rule and felt strange and foreign to him. He is Koxinga's 11th generation descendant and his original name is Zheng Wenji.
