= Inagaki =

Inagaki (Japanese: 稲垣) is a Japanese surname. Notable people with the surname include:

- Inagaki Chusei (稲垣 仲静; 1897–1922), Japanese painter
- Fumio Inagaki (稲垣 史生), Japanese microbiologist
- Goro Inagaki (稲垣 吾郎; born 1973), Japanese singer and musician
- Hiroshi Inagaki (稲垣 浩; 1905–1980), Japanese filmmaker
- Jitsuo Inagaki (稲垣 実男; 1928–2009), Japanese politician
- Junichi Inagaki (稲垣 潤一; born 1953), Japanese popular singer
- Konomi Inagaki (稲垣 好; born 2004), Japanese voice actress
- Manjiro Inagaki (稲垣 満次郎; 1861–1908), Japanese diplomat
- Riichiro Inagaki (稲垣 理一郎; born 1976), Japanese manga writer
- Saori Inagaki (稲垣 早織; born 1990), Japanese rhythmic gymnast
- Seiji Inagaki (稲垣 誠司; born 1973), Japanese athlete
- Shisei Inagaki (稲垣 史生; 1912-1996), Japanese novelist
- Takashi Inagaki (稲垣 隆史; born 1937-2025), Japanese actor and voice actor
- Taruho Inagaki (稲垣 足穂; 1900–1977), Japanese writer
- Etsu Inagaki Sugimoto (1874–1950), Japanese-American autobiographer & writer
- Sumie Inagaki (稲垣 寿美恵; born 1966), Japanese female ultramarathon runner and world record-holder
- Inagaki Toshijiro (稲垣 稔二郎; 1902–1963), Japanese textile artist

== Fictional characters ==
- Mami Inagaki, a character from the Strike Witches franchise

== See also ==
- Inagaki, Aomori, a former village in Aomori Prefecture, Japan
- 5824 Inagaki, a main-belt asteroid
