= Ming Zheng =

Chinese military and political force (1628–1683)

- 1628–1683
- Zheng's order flag Zheng family logo

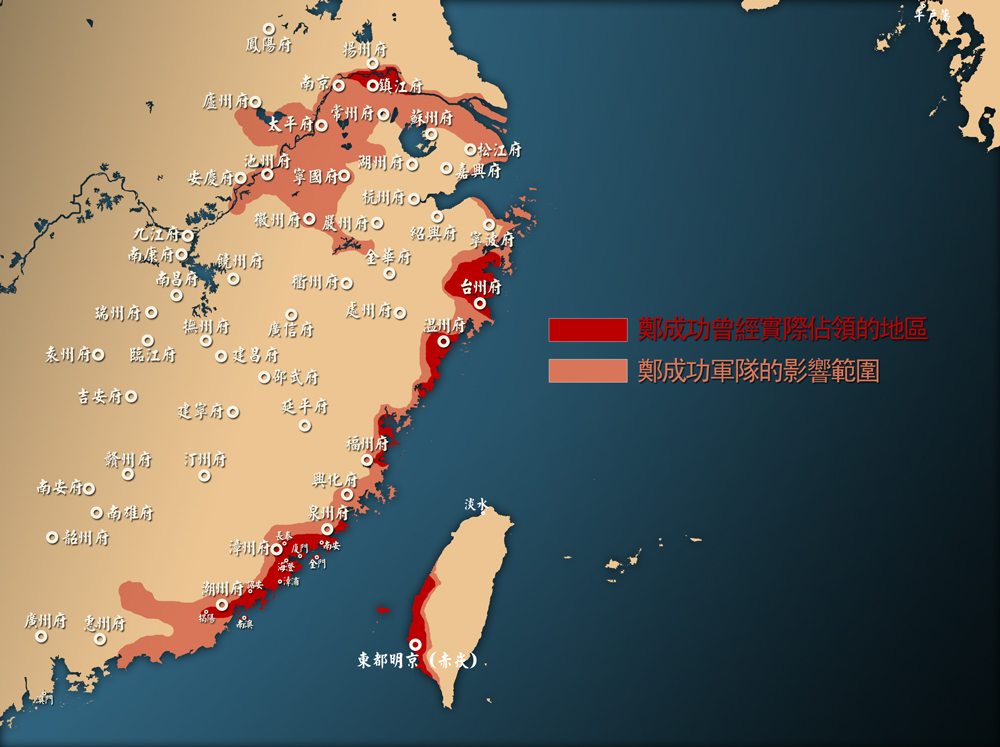
- Maps of Zheng Chenggong's period
- Common languages: Hokkien, Mandarin and Classical Chinese
- Government: military dictatorship
- leader/monarch
  - 1628—1646: Zheng Zhilong
  - 1646—1662: Zheng Chenggong
  - 1662—1681: Zheng Jing
  - 1662: Zheng Xi
  - 1681: Zheng Kezang
  - 1681—1683: Zheng Keshuang
- History
  - Zheng Zhilong surrendered to the Ming Dynasty: September–October 1628
  - Zheng Chenggong's Northern Expedition: 1657—1659
  - Zheng Chenggong's Eastern Expedition: 1661—1662
  - Battle of Penghu: July 10–16, 1683
  - Zheng Keshuang surrendered to the Qing Dynasty: October 8 1683
- Today part of: Republic of China; China

The Ming Zheng (1628–1683) was a military and political force that, following Zheng Chenggong's capture of southwestern Taiwan in 1662, became known as Dongdu, Dongning, and Haishang. Led by the Zheng family and owing allegiance to the Southern Ming Dynasty, its jurisdiction encompassed the southeastern coast of China and the southwestern region of Taiwan.

== History ==
=== Founding ===
Zheng Zhilong was originally the most powerful pirate in the East China Sea and South China Sea. In September 1628, during the first year of the Chongzhen Emperor’s reign in the Ming Dynasty (27 September–26 October 1628), he was recruited by the imperial court and appointed as a coastal defense guerrilla. After gaining official recognition, his maritime trade business flourished, and he became the dominant naval power from the East China Sea to the South China Sea.

At its peak, the trade network of the Ming-Zheng forces extended across a vast region, including Dadi, Fenni, Champa, Luzon, Jingang, Beigang, Dayuan, Hirado, Nagasaki, Mumbai, Banten, Old Port, Batavia, Malacca, Cambodia, and Siam. Zheng Zhilong's influence was so great that he was able to control trade between China and the Dutch East India Company, a major European power. However, local trade relations were less stable. Unwilling to submit to Zheng’s dominance, the Dutch allied with Chinese pirates to attack him, but they were decisively defeated at the Battle of Liaoluo Bay.

=== Opposing the Qing Dynasty ===
On 25 April 1644 (19 March, the seventeenth year of the Chongzhen Emperor's reign in the Ming Dynasty), following the Jiashen Incident, Li Zicheng captured Beijing, the capital of the Ming Dynasty, leading to its collapse.

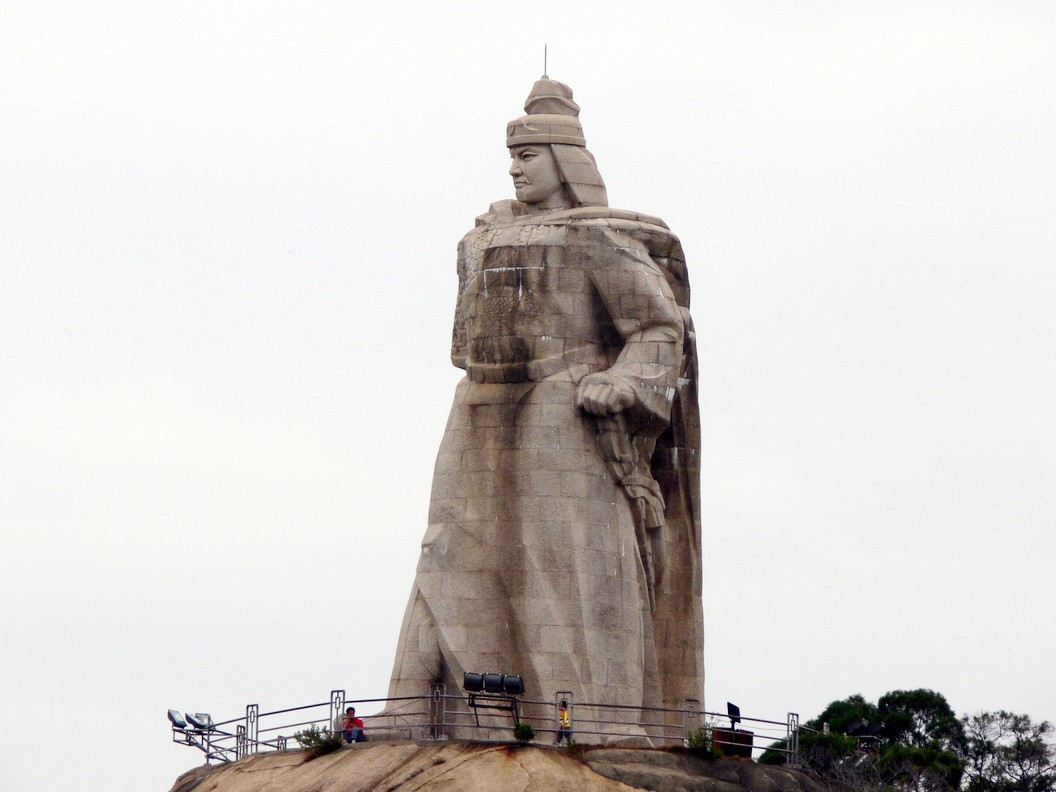
Statue of Zheng Chenggong

In 1645, Dodo, Prince Yu led Qing forces south and captured Zhu Changxun, resulting in the downfall of the Hongguang regime. In response, Zheng Zhilong supported Emperor Longwu of the Southern Ming in Fujian, continuing the resistance against the Qing Dynasty. Between 1644 and 1645, Zheng was awarded numerous peerages and held key positions, including Minister of the Ministry of Hubu,the Minister of the Ministry of War, and the Minister of the Ministry of Industry.

However, in December 1646, Zheng Zhilong was lured into surrendering to the Qing with promises of a high-ranking position and a generous salary. His son, Zheng Chenggong, failed to dissuade him and, in protest, led about 20 followers to the Nan’an Confucius Temple, where he burned his Confucian robes and swore before Confucius that he would no longer recognize Zheng Zhilong as his father. Zheng Chenggong then joined the resistance, formally severing ties with his father, and retreated with his followers to Kinmen.

Zheng Zhilong had hoped that surrendering to the Qing would protect his family's wealth and status. However, the Qing general Boluo violated their agreement, arresting Zheng Zhilong and his followers and sending them to Yanjing (modern-day Beijing). Qing forces also attacked the Zheng family’s hometown. Zheng Chenggong’s mother, Tagawa Matsu, had recently arrived from Japan to reunite with her family in Fujian but was caught in the chaos. Facing the destruction of her home, she committed suicide. Upon learning of his mother’s death, Zheng Chenggong became even more determined to resist the Qing.

In August 1646, Emperor Longwu was captured by the Qing army. Following the collapse of the Longwu regime, Zheng Chenggong fled to Kinmen, where he began recruiting soldiers from various coastal regions, including former subordinates of Zheng Zhilong. He even raised thousands of troops in Nanao. In December 1646 (January 1647 in the Gregorian calendar), Zheng Chenggong formally declared his resistance against the Qing in Xiaokinmen (modern-day Lieyu Township, Kinmen County).

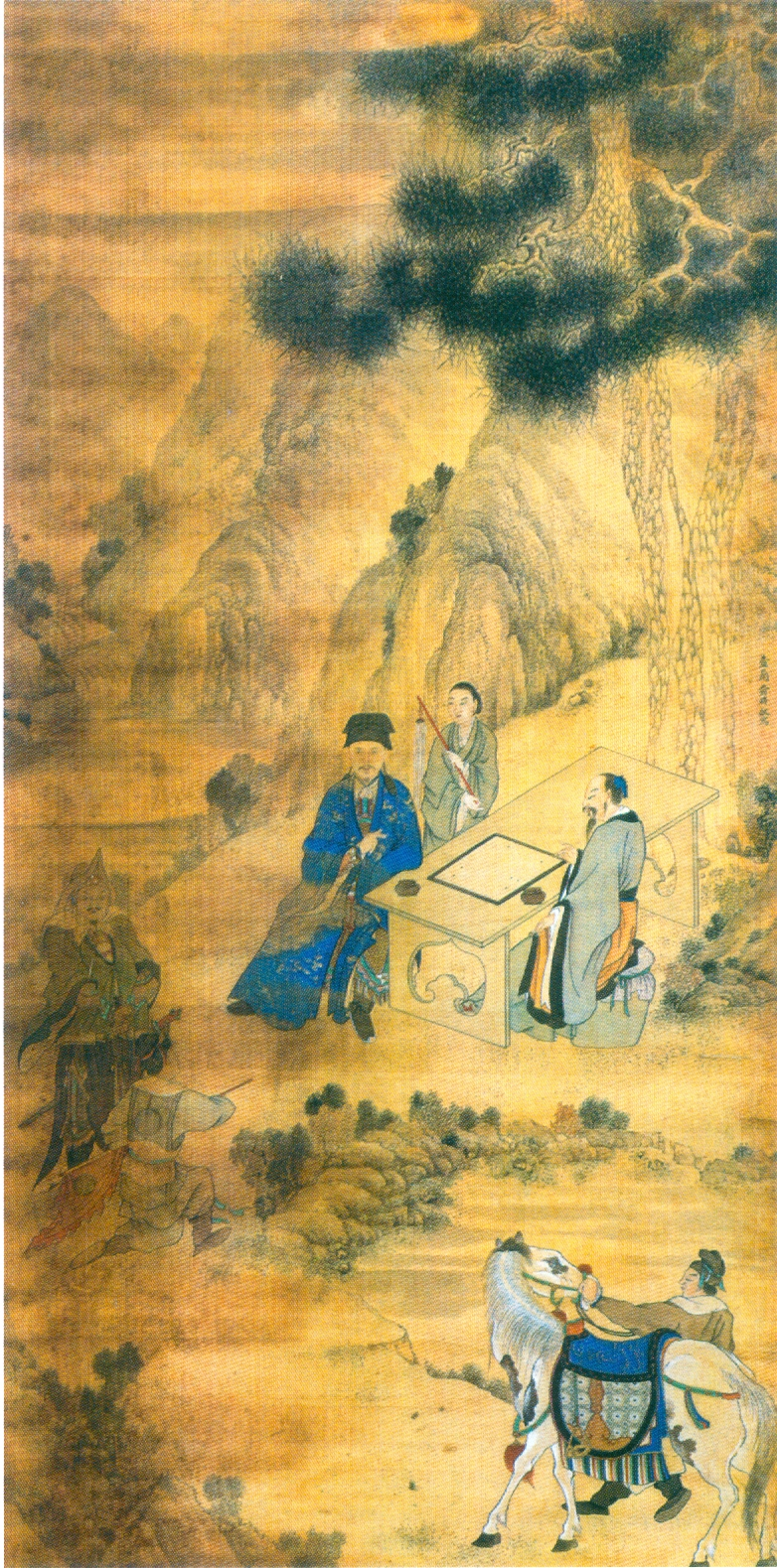
Portrait of Zheng Chenggong

=== Battle of Chao Xia ===
In the latter half of the fifth year of Yongli (1651, corresponding to the eighth year of Shunzhi in the Qing Dynasty), Zheng's army engaged in battle in Haicheng (present-day Longhai City) in southern Fujian. They secured a victory and recaptured several territories, including Pinghe County, Zhangpu County, Zhao'an County, and Nanjing County. By the end of that year, Zhang Mingzhen and others sought refuge with Zheng, further bolstering his forces.

In January 1652 (the first month of the second year, equivalent to the sixth year of Yongli and the ninth year of Shunzhi in the Qing Dynasty), He Wenxing, the Qing guard stationed in Haicheng, surrendered to Zheng Chenggong. In February 1652, Zheng’s forces attacked Changtai District. In response, the Qing Dynasty dispatched Chen Jin with a large relief force, and the two sides clashed at Jiangdong Bridge. Leveraging his detailed knowledge of southern Fujian’s terrain, Zheng Chenggong orchestrated several ambushes near the bridge, defeating Chen Jin and annihilating most of the Qing troops. The victory at Jiangdong Bridge soon led to the capture of Changtai.

Following the conquest of Changtai, Zheng Chenggong assembled an army to assault Zhangzhou and laid siege to the city. In April 1652, to break the siege, the Qing forces launched an invasion of Xiamen with hundreds of ships. In turn, Zheng dispatched Chen Hui, Zhou Rui, and others with an armada of more than one hundred warships to counterattack, defeating the Qing fleet at Chongwu in what became known as the Battle of Chongwu. Although Zheng’s naval victory prevented further pressure on Zhangzhou, the situation in the city remained dire, as recorded by Wang Yingyuan, the Qing-appointed governor of Fujian Province.

In September 1652 (the sixth year of Yongli, corresponding to the ninth year of Shunzhi in the Qing Dynasty), Qing general Gushan Ezhen, together with Jinli, led an army of 10,000 troops into Fujian, entering Quanzhou Prefecture. In response, Zheng Chenggong ordered the siege of Zhangzhou to be lifted. He then redeployed his forces in Jiangdong with the intention of ambushing Jinli's army in the same manner as he had defeated Chen Jin. However, Jinli anticipated the maneuver, and fierce hand-to-hand combat ensued. During the battle, Guo Ting from Ding Town and Hong Chengchong from Guard You Town were killed. Following this setback, Zheng’s forces were forced to retreat to safeguard Haicheng and Xiamen, while the Qing troops used their success to recapture Nanjing, Zhangpu, Pinghe, and Zhao'an counties.

In April 1653 (the seventh year of Yongli, corresponding to the tenth year of Shunzhi in the Qing Dynasty), Jinli invaded Haicheng, prompting a fierce confrontation with Zheng Chenggong’s forces. Both sides deployed guns and cannons as their primary armaments. Under a relentless barrage from Qing artillery, Zheng’s troops suffered heavy losses, and several of his generals were killed. In an effort to raise morale, Zheng Chenggong personally moved to the front line, narrowly avoiding enemy shellfire. On 2 June 1653 (recorded as the fifth watch on the seventh day of May in the lunar calendar), Jinli ordered his forces to use air artillery cover and deployed the Green Battalion at the vanguard, followed by his flag-bearing soldiers. Although he attempted to storm the city in one decisive move, Zheng’s forces resisted the assault. After dawn, upon assessing the situation, Zheng Chenggong discovered that the Qing army was suffering from shortages of gunpowder, funds, and provisions. Seizing this opportunity, he lured the Qing forces into a decisive engagement. While the Qing army was in the process of crossing the river, Zheng launched a fire attack that defeated Jinli, thereby securing victory at the Battle of Haicheng and ensuring the safety of Haicheng. Subsequently, Jinli was recalled to the capital by the Qing court, and the conflict reached a stalemate.

=== Negotiate peace with Qing ===
In May of the seventh year of Yongli (1653, corresponding to the tenth year of Shunzhi in the Qing Dynasty), after the Qing army had been defeated twice, Emperor Shunzhi conferred upon Zheng Chenggong the title "Haicheng Gong," which Zheng Chenggong declined. In August, representatives from both sides negotiated peace at Baoen Temple in Quan'an, allowing Zheng Chenggong's forces to suspend hostilities, secure provisions, and reorganize. In November, Emperor Shunzhi issued another seal and promised to grant Quanzhou Prefecture as a garrison for Zheng Chenggong's troops.

In the eighth year of Yongli (1654, corresponding to the eleventh year of Shunzhi in the Ming and Qing Dynasties), Zhang Mingzhen observed that the Qing army had concentrated its forces in Fujian, leaving the defenses of Jiangsu, Zhejiang, and other regions vulnerable. He subsequently sought instructions from Zheng Chenggong and led a fleet of one hundred warships northward to capture the southern region of the Yangtze River. Zhang Mingzhen's forces advanced along the river, reaching Jinshan Temple and threatening Jiangning Prefecture; however, lacking adequate reinforcements, they were forced to withdraw. In February, the Qing government sent envoys once again to Zheng Chenggong, promising to grant the counties of Xinghua Prefecture, Quanzhou, Zhangzhou, and Chaozhou as fiefs. Zheng Chenggong accepted the seal of "Haicheng Gong" but refused to shave his hair. Although local authorities in Fujian supported his forces with food and pay, many officials in Guangdong opposed the arrangement; Liu Bolu, the commander-in-chief of Chaozhou, even submitted a petition against accepting Zheng Chenggong's army.

In August, the Qing Dynasty dispatched envoys for a final round of peace negotiations, but Zheng Chenggong refused to negotiate. In October, he sent Lin Cha and Zhou Rui to oversee his army's westward march, provisioning them with ten months’ worth of rations. In November, Liu Guoxuan, the deputy defender of Zhangzhou under the Qing administration, surrendered to Zheng Chenggong and led his forces into Zhangzhou's capital, Zhang Shiyao, which also capitulated to Zheng's army.

=== Zheng Qing fights again ===
In December, the Qing army abandoned its policy of recruiting Zheng Jun and instead appointed Ji Du as General Dingyuan. In April of the ninth year of Yongli (1655, corresponding to the twelfth year of Shunzhi in the Qing Dynasty), Emperor Yongli conferred upon Zheng Chenggong the title of King of Yanping, after which some also referred to him as "Zheng Yanping." Because Emperor Yongli wielded little real power, Zheng was granted the authority to appoint officials. Each time Zheng conferred an official title, he invited Prince Zhu Shugui and other members of the Ming clan to observe the ceremony as a sign of respect for the established system. Additionally, Zheng Chenggong renamed Xiamen (then known as Zhongzuo Prefecture) to Siming Prefecture.

After Li Dingguo conquered Zhaoqing, his forces were defeated outside Guangzhou, and he retreated into Guangxi due to the lack of reinforcements. In May, when Lin Cha and others reported that they had not received sufficient support, Zheng Chenggong became incensed and proposed another encirclement of Guangdong; however, this plan ultimately failed.

In July, Zheng Chenggong appointed Hong Xu as the governor of the naval division and Gan Hui as the governor of the land division, providing them with 10,000 taels of silver to lead the Northern Expedition. The expedition was noted for its strict discipline; for example, when marching to Meizhou North Town, a soldier was executed for the minor offense of picking up a chicken. In a similar instance, Gan Hui pleaded guilty to an infraction and requested punishment—he was disciplined with ten strokes.

In the tenth year of Yongli (1656, corresponding to the thirteenth year of Shunzhi in the Qing Dynasty), the Zheng army established its bases in Xiamen and Jin, frequently engaging the Qing forces in South China.

In June, in response to Dutch and Spanish forces that had attacked Zheng's merchant ships and killed Chinese people, Zheng Chenggong ordered a blockade of the Taiwan Strait. This measure prevented the Dutch from conducting entrepot trade, resulting in a sharp decline in their income.

In October, Zheng Chenggong dispatched Huang Ting to attack Ou Ting, a territory under Chaozhou's jurisdiction. According to the Chaozhou Chronicles, Xu Long's headquarters in Nanyang Village suffered a devastating blow during the assault.

During the winter, Zheng Chenggong launched a large-scale Northern Expedition and secured a victory at the Battle of Huguoling in December. During this campaign, his forces looted Fu'an, as documented by the missionary Victorio Riccio (1621–1685).

Zheng's army remained in eastern Fujian for ten months, withdrawing only in the summer of the eleventh year of Yongli (1657). In March, the Dutch sent He Bin to Xianchen in Xiamen for an audience, and in June, Zheng Chenggong agreed to resume trade.

=== Northern expedition ===
In July of the eleventh year of Yongli (1658, corresponding to the fifteenth year of Shunzhi in the Qing Dynasty), Zheng Chenggong led his army on a northern expedition and issued strict military orders prior to the march.

In the thirteenth year of Yongli (1659, the sixteenth year of Shunzhi in the Qing Dynasty), Zheng Chenggong once again spearheaded a northern expedition. His forces successfully navigated the Yangtze River and joined troops under Zhang Huangyan, conquering Dinghai, Guazhou, Zhenjiang and other localities. In one notable engagement, Zheng’s army—deploying only four Tiger Guard generals and four sentries to retake Jiangpu—forced 200 Qing soldiers to flee, an encounter that became known in history as Zheng Chenggong's Battle of the Yangtze River.

In June of the same year, Zheng Chenggong led his troops in an attempt to encircle Nanjing. The campaign ended in failure, with his army suffering losses of more than 20,000 soldiers. Although the Battle of Nanjing was initially regarded as one of his most promising endeavors, the operation ultimately culminated in a decisive defeat that dealt a major setback to his anti-Qing efforts.

=== Succession and consolidation in Taiwan ===
In July 1659, after being defeated at Jinling City, Zheng Chenggong retreated to the southeastern coastal areas. With his sphere of influence gradually shrinking under continuous encirclement and suppression by the Qing army, he sought a long-term base from which to resist the Qing Dynasty and restore the Ming Dynasty. To that end, Zheng launched an eastern expedition in 1661. On 1 February 1662, he captured Fort Zeelandia and successfully conquered the Dutch territory of Taiwan, establishing the first Chinese-owned regime in the island's history. However, he died of illness shortly thereafter.

After Zheng Chenggong's death in 1662, his official position and title were inherited by his son, Zheng Jing. The Leiden University Library in the Netherlands preserves a letter titled "The Successor's Crown Prince to the King of the Netherlands." In the letter, Zheng Jing refers to himself as "the Successor's Crown Prince" and his father as "the former king." He expresses his willingness to make peace, engage in trade, and form joint forces with the Netherlands. Additionally, the Shaanxi History Museum preserves a cannon cast by Zheng Zheng in the 33rd year of the Yongli reign (1679). The cannon bears three lines of inscriptions—in both official and seal script—on its back, attesting that Zheng Jing is the crown prince of Zheng Chenggong.

=== Western expedition ===
Zheng Jing used Taiwan as his base to resist the Qing Dynasty for 20 years. During this period, he sent troops to southern Fujian in an effort to regain lost territory from 1673 to 1680. Beginning in the 1680s, the Qing army successively eliminated key adversaries, including Shang Zhixin of Guangdong and Geng Jingzhong of Fujian, while Wu Sangui of Yunnan also died. As a result, the power of the Zheng family in the Ming loyalist regime retreated, leaving them with control only over Xiamen.

In 1680, General Wan Zhengse of the Qing Dynasty dispatched envoys to persuade Zhu Tiangui (formerly General Geng Jingzhong), the deputy governor of the Zheng Army's Navy, to surrender with a fleet of 300 ships and more than 20,000 soldiers. Facing mounting pressure, Zheng Jing abandoned Xiamen and led the remaining forces back to Taiwan. At that point, the Zheng family's influence in southern Fujian effectively disappeared.

=== Demise ===
After Zheng Jing's death, Zheng Keshuang succeeded to the throne of Yanping and continued to be known as "the crown prince of the great general." In 1683, Emperor Kangxi launched an attack against the Ming and Zheng forces, appointing Shi Lang—a general who had defected from the Ming and Zheng—as commander. Shi Lang defeated the main force of the Zheng army, led by Liu Guoxuan, at the Battle of Penghu. Following this defeat, Zheng Keshuang immediately announced his surrender, marking the end of the Ming loyalist Zheng family.

=== Territorial transformations ===
During the Ming Dynasty, the Zheng family controlled territories in Taiwan and also employed military force to expand their holdings on the mainland. Between 1673 and 1680, they occupied Zhangzhou, Quanzhou, and Xinghua in southern Fujian, as well as Chaozhou and Huizhou in Guangdong. Over time, however, parts of these territories were gradually lost.
