= Yan Siqi =

Chinese tailor, merchant and fugitive

- 顏思齊
- Yan Siqi's portrait
- Born: 1586; Haicheng, Zhangzhou, Fujian, Ming dynasty
- Died: September 1625 (aged 38–39); Zhuluo Mountain, Dutch Formosa
- Occupations: Tailor, merchant

Yan Siqi (Chinese: 顏思齊; pinyin: Yán Sīqí; Pe̍h-ōe-jī: Gân Su-chê; 1586 – September 1625), courtesy name Zhenquan (振泉) or Shuquan (樞泉), was a Chinese tailor, fugitive, and armed maritime merchant from the Ming dynasty. He is also known as the "Pioneer King of Taiwan" (開台王). He may have also been known to Dutch authorities as Pedro Chino (Chinese Peter).

== Life ==
=== Early childhood ===
There are no surviving biographies of Yan Shiqi and most surviving information about his early life comes from the somewhat unreliable "Taiwan Foreign Records" (臺灣外記) by the little known Qing Dynasty historian Jiang Ri Sheng (江日昇). Because records of his early life are similar to those of the Chinese pirate Li Dan, some academics have questioned whether Yan Shiqi even existed. However, two other historical sources mention the name of Yan Shiqi: "The Record of Praise of Virtue by the Grand Scribe Li" (太史李公居鄉頌德碑記), written by Lu Hua'ao (盧化鰲) in 1635 and the Chongzheng Annals (崇禎長編), written by Wang Ji (zh:汪楫) in the Qing Dynasty as a historical record of events during the reign of the Chongzhen Emperor.

According to the "Taiwan Foreign Records", Yan Shiqi was born in Haicheng, Zhangzhou, Fujian, a town which had a tradition of martial arts. In 1603, at the age of 14 or 15, Yan Shiqi became a fugitive as a result of him beating a eunuch's servant to death.

At the time, Zhangzhou was an important window for trade and with many foreign ships at its port. Yan Shiqi escaped China on a ship and arrived in Japan, which was relatively stable during the era of Tokugawa Shogunate. Many Chinese had settled in Nagasaki either as merchants engaging in foreign trade or as pirates.

=== Career advancement ===
Upon his arrival in Japan, Yan Shiqi started his own tailoring business. Due to his exceptional craftsmanship, the business quickly prospered, allowing him to establish himself in Japan.

Later, he would engage in a foreign trade business (sometimes characterized as piracy). He stayed in Japan for almost 20 years.

=== Coup plot ===
In 1624, for unknown reasons, Yan Shiqi and his brothers planned to overthrow the Tokugawa Shogunate and establish a new regime. The plot was leaked before the uprising, they were forced to run for their lives again.

=== Brotherhood ===
Yan Shiqi was the leader of the 27 men, that went to the port of Nagasaki. Among them were: Yan Shiqi, Yang Tian Sheng (deputy financial officer of Dachiban), Hong Sheng (from Putian, Xinghua), Chen De also known as Chen Zhong Ji (from Haicheng), Zhang Hong (from Hui'an, Quanzhou), nicknamed "Iron Bone Zhang Hong", who can lift 500 catties (250 kg) of bluestone, Chen Xun (from Jinjiang, Quanzhou), Lin Fu (nicknamed "Deep Mountain Monkey"), Li Ying, Zhuang Gui, Yang Jing, Lin Yi, Huang Bi, Zhang Hui, Wang Ping, Huang Zhao, Li Junchen (from Nanjing, Zhangzhou), Zheng Yiguan also known as Zheng Zhilong, father of Koxinga of the Kingdom of Tungning, He Jin, Gao Guan, Yu Zu, Fang Sheng, Xu Ma, Huang Ruilang, Tang Gong, Fu Chun, Liu Zongzhao and Zheng Yu.

Later, he met with Li Dan, a merchant who traded between Ming China and Japan at that time. Hong Sheng and Yang Tian Sheng were under the command of Li Dan which total around 4000 people. Under the influence of Li Dan, Hong Sheng and Yang Tian Sheng joined Yan Shiqi's group and formed an alliance with Zheng Zhilong.

=== Taiwan ===
Formosa and the Pescadores in the 17th century Ming dynasty Dutch territory Spanish territory Kingdom of Middag

At this time, Yan Shiqi and his brothers had 13 large ships. It should be said that they still have a certain strength. Chen Zhong Ji said that Taiwan was a good place so they all went there.

After arriving in Taiwan, he immediately opened up Beigang and built ten settlements (Main Village, Front Village, Back Village, Left Village, Right Village, Coast Defense Village, Grains Supply Village, Sentinel Village, Treatment Village and North Village). Beigang had sufficient sunshine, abundant rainfall and fertile soil, it is extremely suitable for farming. However, their labour force was insufficient, therefore, he sent Yang Tian Sheng to secretly return to Fujian and recruited more than 3000 labourers from Zhangzhou and Quanzhou to Beigang. This was a large scale migration of Han Chinese to Taiwan.

However, this large force caused panic among the natives on the island. They thought that foreign enemies were invading, so they gathered to attack. At this moment, Yan Shiqi showed his intentions, he comforted the natives and agreed on the boundaries. After that, they did not intrude each other.

Land reclamation, required capital investment, so Yan Shiqi selected a group of people with sailing experience. With the original 13 large ships, they used the convenience of sea transportation, carry out sea trade with the mainland, at the same time, they organized sea fishing and island hunting, developed the economy and met the needs of immigrants.

In the 16th and 17th centuries, the Dutch, Spanish and Chinese entered Taiwan in large numbers and introduced various plants, such as: mango, sweet potato, pineapple, jackfruit and so on.

== Death ==
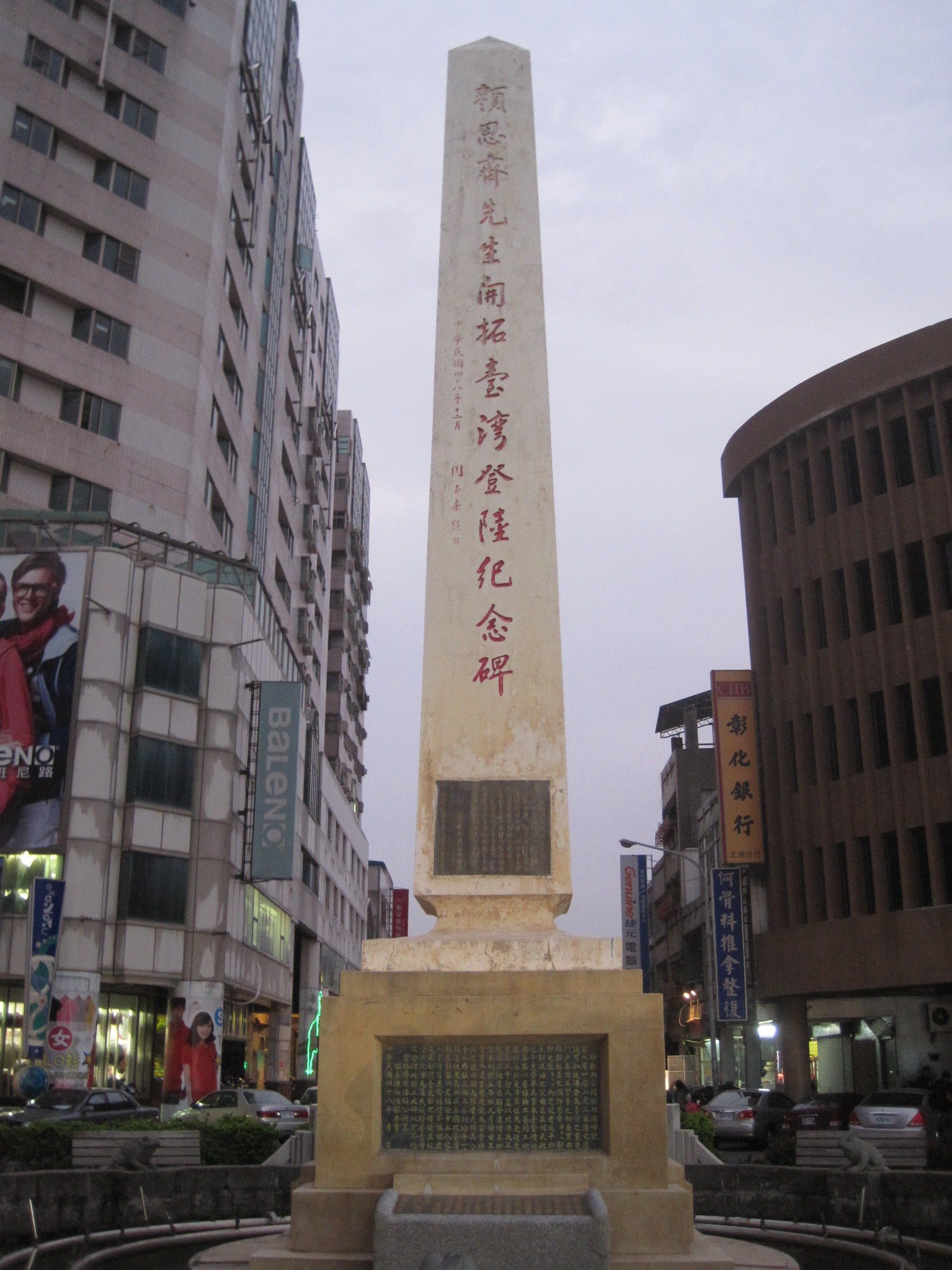
Monument of Yan Shiqi in Beigang, Yunlin County, Taiwan

Yan Shiqi experienced multiple diseases over the course of a year, including typhoid fever. He died during a hunting trip to Zhuluo Mountain at the age of 37 and was buried at Jiangjun Mountain in Jiaoli, Baihe District, Tainan City.

When he died, he had more than 100 ships and was the most powerful armed maritime merchant in the late Ming Dynasty. In 1625, the young and talented, Zheng Zhilong was elected as the leader. In 1628, Zheng Zhilong decided to surrender to Ming Dynasty but Chen Zhong Ji refused to accept it and planned to rebel. Chen Zhong Ji was then killed by Zheng Zhilong. In just 2 years, Zheng Zhilong developed the naval armed groups into more than 1000 ships and 70000 people. After the fall of Ming Dynasty, Zheng Zhilong surrendered to Qing Dynasty but was executed since his son, Koxinga was unwilling to surrender.

== Commemoration ==
A monument was erected in Beigang, Yunlin to record the history of Yan Shiqi's and Zheng Zhilong's development of Beigang by the mayor of Beigang, Chen Xiang Yang in 1959.

Yan Cuo Liao was a small village in Shuilin, Yunlin with Yan Shiqi's theme. It was located on the road from Beigang to Kouhu. There were 10 comic story walls drawn on the outer wall of the old houses to display Yan Shiqi's history. Each households had a kettle hanged as letterbox. At the hall, visitors are welcomed to know more about Yan Shiqi by artist Du Fuan. Surrounding attractions were explained.

Yan Shiqi's cultural park and memorial hall was officially opened to the public on 14 June 2019. It was located at Haicang, Xiamen, Fujian, China.

== See also ==
- History of China
- Dutch Formosa
- History of Taiwan
- Timeline of Taiwanese history
- Han Taiwanese
