= Koxinga =

Founder of the Tungning Kingdom of Taiwan

Zheng Chenggong 鄭成功
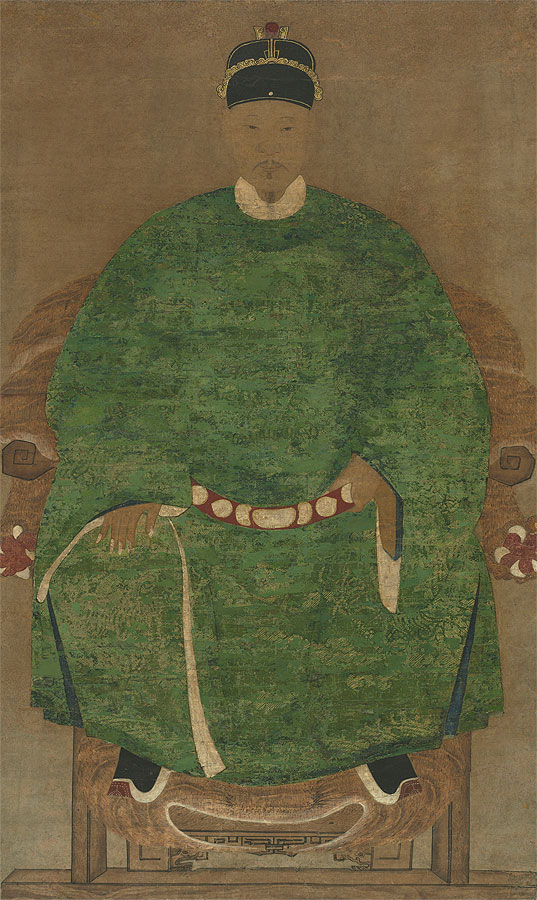
- The Portrait of Koxinga, mid-17th century

Prince of Yanping
- Reign: May or June 1655 – 23 June 1662
- Predecessor: None
- Successor: Zheng Jing; Zheng Xi (as Lord of Tungtu)
- Born: Zheng Sen; 27 August 1624; Hirado, Hizen Province, Japan
- Died: 23 June 1662 (aged 37); Anping, Kingdom of Tungning
- Burial: Tomb of Zheng Chenggong (鄭成功墓; in present-day Nan'an, Quanzhou, Fujian)
- Spouse: Dong You
- Issue: Zheng Jing and nine other sons, four daughters
Posthumous name
- Prince Wu of Chao (潮武王)
- House: Koxinga
- Dynasty: Tungning
- Father: Zheng Zhilong
- Mother: Tagawa Matsu

Koxinga

Chinese name
- Traditional Chinese: 國姓爺
- Simplified Chinese: 国姓爷
- Hokkien POJ: Kok-sèng-iâ; Kok-sèⁿ-iâ
- Literal meaning: Lord of the Imperial Surname
Transcriptions
Standard Mandarin
- Hanyu Pinyin: Guóxìngyé
- Bopomofo: ㄍㄨㄛˊㄒㄧㄥˋㄧㄝˊ
- Wade–Giles: Kuo^{2}-hsing^{4}-yeh^{2}
- IPA: [kwǒɕîŋjě]
Southern Min
- Hokkien POJ: Kok-sèng-iâ; Kok-sèⁿ-iâ
- Tâi-lô: Kok-sìng-iâ

Zheng Chenggong
- Traditional Chinese: 鄭成功
- Simplified Chinese: 郑成功
- Hokkien POJ: Tēⁿ Sêng-kong
Transcriptions
Standard Mandarin
- Hanyu Pinyin: Zhèng Chénggōng
- Bopomofo: ㄓㄥˋ ㄔㄥˊㄍㄨㄥ
- Wade–Giles: Cheng^{4} Ch'eng^{2}-kung^{1}
- IPA: [ʈʂə̂ŋ ʈʂʰə̌ŋkʊ́ŋ]
Hakka
- Romanization: Tshàng Sṳ̀n-Kûng
Southern Min
- Hokkien POJ: Tēⁿ Sêng-kong
- Tâi-lô: Tēnn Sîng-kong

Zheng Sen
- Traditional Chinese: 鄭森
- Simplified Chinese: 郑森
- Hokkien POJ: Tēⁿ Sim
Transcriptions
Standard Mandarin
- Hanyu Pinyin: Zhèng Sēn
- Bopomofo: ㄓㄥˋㄙㄣ
- Wade–Giles: Cheng^{4} Sen^{1}
- IPA: [ʈʂə̂ŋ sə́n]
Southern Min
- Hokkien POJ: Tēⁿ Sim
- Tâi-lô: Tēnn Sim

Japanese name
- Hiragana: ふくまつ
- Kyūjitai: 福󠄁松󠄁
- Shinjitai: 福松
Transcriptions
- Revised Hepburn: Fukumatsu
- Kunrei-shiki: Hukumatu

Zheng Chenggong (Chinese: 鄭成功; pinyin: Zhèng Chénggōng; Pe̍h-ōe-jī: Tēⁿ Sêng-kong; Tâi-lô: Tēnn Sîng-kong; 27 August 1624 – 23 June 1662), also romanized in Taiwan as Cheng Cheng-kung, born Zheng Sen (鄭森) and better known internationally by his honorific title Koxinga (國姓爺), (Note: Chinese: 國姓爺; pinyin: Guóxìngyé; Pe̍h-ōe-jī: Kok-sèng-iâ; Tâi-lô: Kok-sìng-iâ; lit. 'lord granted with royal surname', Kokusen'ya (Japanese: 国姓爺; Japanese pronunciation: [ko.kɯ̥.seꜜɰ̃.ja])) was a Southern Ming general who resisted the Qing conquest of China in the 17th century and expelled the Dutch from Taiwan, founding the Kingdom of Tungning.

Born in Japan to a Chinese father and a Japanese mother, Zheng rose through the Ming court via the imperial examinations and was serving as a Guozijian scholar in Nanjing when Beijing fell to rebels in 1644. He swore allegiance to Longwu Emperor, who favored and granted him the imperial surname Zhu in 1645, a name he proudly used instead of his native Zheng surname for the rest of his life, hence popularizing his aforementioned honorific name. He was made the Prince of Yanping (延平王) by the Yongli Emperor in 1655 for his stern loyalty and numerous anti-Qing campaigns. He was best known for defeating the Dutch East India Company's colonial state on Taiwan, who had been harassing and raiding his maritime supply lines, at the Siege of Fort Zeelandia in 1662 and established a dynastic state on the island that continued to exist until 1683. After defeating the Dutch, he died suddenly in 1662 while planning to invade Luzon in retaliation for the Fourth Sangley Massacre committed by Spanish colonists in the Philippines.

== Biography ==
=== Early years ===
Zheng Chenggong was born in 1624 in Hirado, Hizen Province, Japan, to Zheng Zhilong, a Han Chinese merchant from Fujian, Ming dynasty China and a local Japanese woman known only by her surname "Tagawa", probably Tagawa Matsu. He was raised there until the age of seven with the Japanese name Fukumatsu (福松) and then moved back to his ancestral Fujian province.

In 1638, Zheng became a Xiucai (秀才, lit. "successful candidate") in the imperial examination and became one of the twelve Linshansheng (廩膳生) of Nan'an. In 1641, he married the niece of Dong Yangxian, an official who was a Jinshi from Hui'an. In 1644, he studied at the Guozijian (Imperial University), where he met and became a student of the famous scholar Qian Qianyi, one of the Three Masters of Jiangdong.

=== Under the Longwu Emperor ===
Following the fall of Ming Dynasty in 1644, in 1645, the Prince of Tang was installed on the throne of the Southern Ming as the Longwu Emperor with support from Zheng Zhilong and his family. The Longwu Emperor established his court in Fuzhou, which was controlled by the Zhengs. In the later part of the year, Prince Lu proclaimed himself regent (監國) in Shaoxing and established his own court there. Although Prince Lu and Longwu's regimes stemmed from the same dynasty, each pursued different goals.

Owing to the natural defenses of Fujian and the military resources of the Zheng family, the emperor was able to remain safe for some time. The Longwu Emperor granted Zheng Zhilong's son, Zheng Sen, a new given name, Chenggong (成功; Chénggōng; Sêng-kong; 'success'), and the title of Koxinga ("lord [granted] with imperial surname"). One of his cousins also had it.

In 1646, Koxinga first led the Ming armies to resist the Manchu invaders and won the favor of the Longwu Emperor. The Longwu Emperor's reign in Fuzhou was brief, as Zheng Zhilong refused to support his plans for a counteroffensive against the rapidly expanding forces of the newly established Qing dynasty by the Manchus. Zheng Zhilong ordered the defending general of Xianxia Pass (仙霞關), Shi Fu (a.k.a. Shi Tianfu, a relative of Shi Lang), to retreat to Fuzhou even when Qing armies approached Fujian. For this reason, the Qing army faced little resistance when it conquered the north of the pass. In September 1646, Qing armies broke through the inadequately defended mountain passes and entered Fujian. Zheng Zhilong retreated to his coastal fortress and the Longwu Emperor faced the Qing armies alone. Longwu's forces were destroyed; he was captured and was executed in October 1646.

=== Zheng Zhilong's surrender and the death of Tagawa ===
The Qing forces sent envoys to meet Zheng Zhilong secretly and offered to appoint him as the governor of both Fujian and Guangdong provinces if he would surrender to the Qing. Zheng Zhilong agreed and ignored the objections of his family, surrendering himself to the Qing forces in Fuzhou on 21 November 1646. Koxinga and his uncles were left as the successors to the leadership of Zheng Zhilong's military forces. Koxinga operated outside Xiamen and recruited many to join his cause in a few months. He used the superiority of his naval forces to launch amphibious raids on Manchu-occupied territory in Fujian and he managed to take Tong'an in Quanzhou prefecture in early 1647. However, Koxinga's forces lacked the ability to defend the newly occupied territory.

Following the fall of Tong'an to Zheng, the Manchus launched a counterattack in the spring of 1647, during which they stormed the Zheng family's hometown of Anping. Koxinga's mother, Lady Tagawa, had come from Japan in 1645 to join her family in Fujian (Koxinga's younger brother, Tagawa Shichizaemon, remained in Japan). She did not follow her husband to surrender to the Qing dynasty. She was caught by Manchu forces in Anping and committed suicide after refusal to submit to the enemy, according to traditional accounts.

=== Resistance to the Qing ===
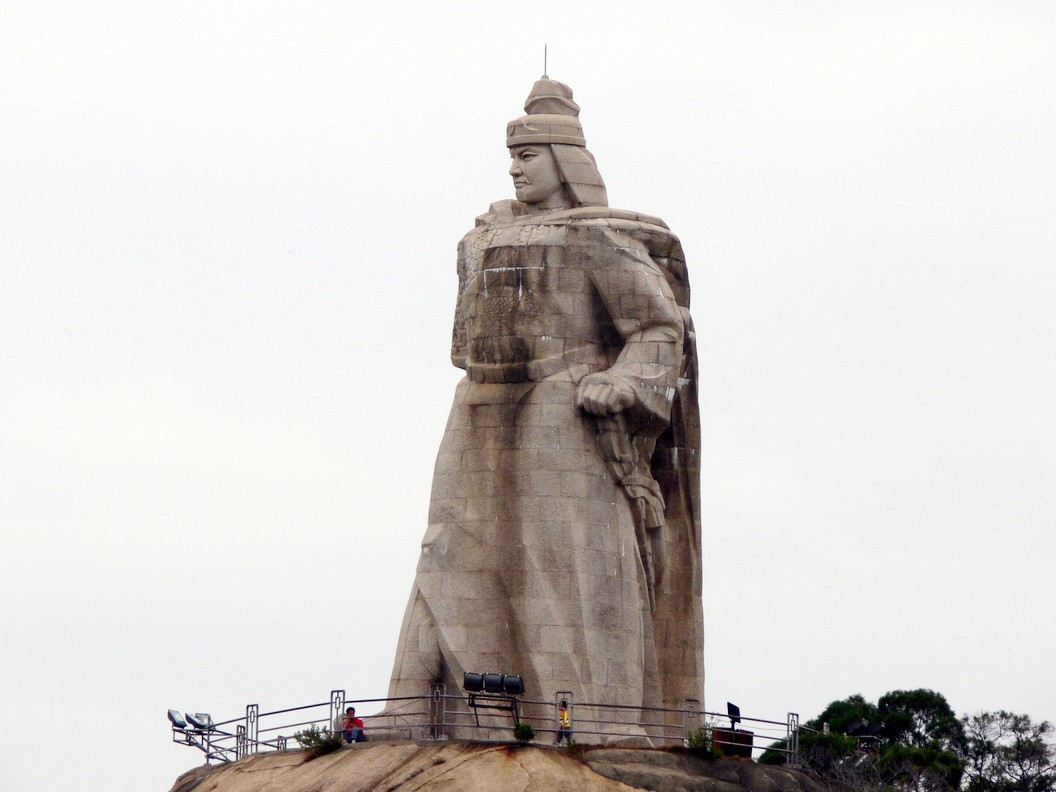
Zheng Chenggong statue in Xiamen, Fujian, China. The granite statue is 15.7 m tall and weighs 1617 tons.

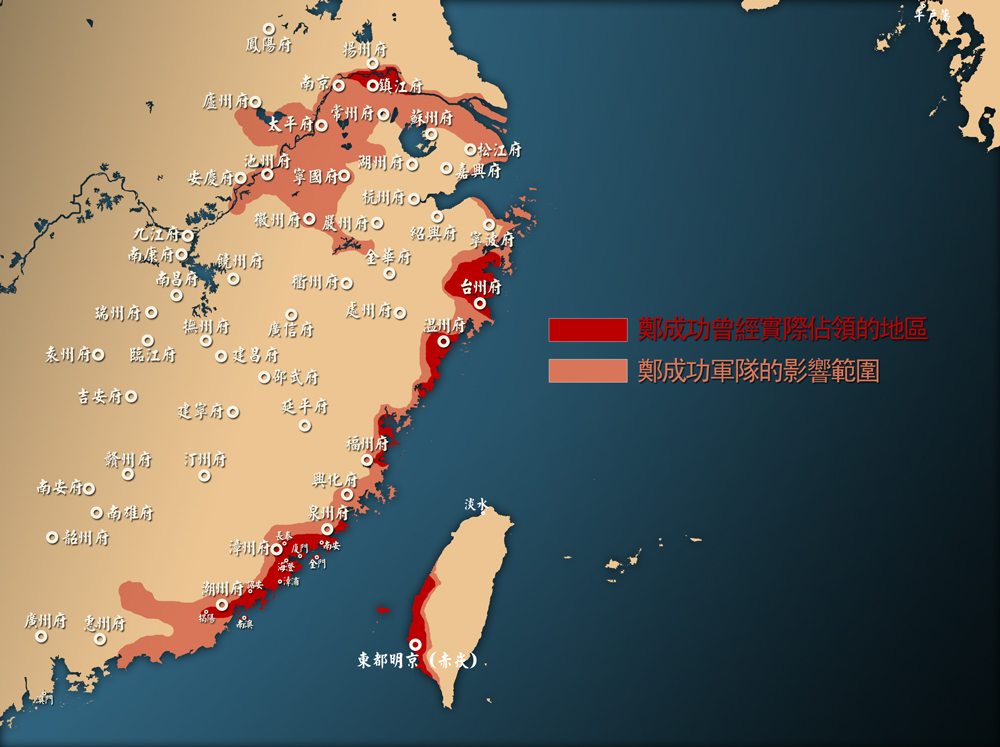
Extent of territory held by Koxinga (red), sphere of influence (pink) during his 1655-1659 campaigns

By 1650, Koxinga was strong enough to establish himself as the head of the Zheng family. He pledged allegiance to the Yongli Emperor of Southern Ming, who created him Prince of Yanping. The Yongli Emperor was fleeing from the Manchus with a motley court and hastily assembled army. Despite one fruitless attempt, Koxinga was unable to do anything to aid the last Ming emperor. Instead, he decided to concentrate on securing his own position on the southeast coast.

Koxinga had a series of military successes in southern Fujian from 1651 to 1652 that increased the Qing government's anxiety over the threat he posed. Zheng Zhilong wrote a letter to his son from Beijing, presumably at the request of the Shunzhi Emperor and the Qing government, urging his son to negotiate with the Manchurians. The long series of negotiations between Koxinga and the Qing dynasty lasted until November 1654. The negotiations ultimately failed. The Qing government then appointed Prince Jidu (son of Jirgalang) to lead an attack on Koxinga's territory after this failure.

On 9 May 1656, Jidu's armies attacked Kinmen (Quemoy), an island near Xiamen that Koxinga had been using to train his troops. Partly as a result of a major storm, the Manchus were defeated, and they lost most of their fleet in the battle. Koxinga had sent one of his naval commanders to capture Zhoushan island prior to Jidu's attack, and now that the Manchus were temporarily without an effective naval force in the Fujian area, Koxinga was free to send a huge army to Zhoushan, which he intended to use as a base to capture Nanjing.

Despite capturing many counties in his initial attack due to surprise and having the initiative, Koxinga announced the final battle in Nanjing ahead of time giving plenty of time for the Qing to prepare because he wanted a decisive, single grand showdown like his father successfully did against the Dutch at the Battle of Liaoluo Bay, throwing away the surprise and initiative which led to its failure. Koxinga's attack on Qing held Nanjing which would interrupt the supply route of the Grand Canal leading to possible starvation in Beijing caused such fear that the Manchus considered returning to Manchuria and abandoning China according to a 1671 account by a French missionary. The commoners and officials in Beijing and Nanjing were waiting to support whichever side won. An official from Qing Beijing sent letters to family and another official in Nanjing, telling them all communication and news from Nanjing to Beijing had been cut off, that the Qing were considering abandoning Beijing and moving their capital far away to a remote location for safety since Koxinga's iron troops were rumored to be invincible. The letter said it reflected the grim situation being felt in Qing Beijing. The official told his children in Nanjing to prepare to defect to Koxinga which he himself was preparing to do. Koxinga's forces intercepted these letters and after reading them Koxinga may have started to regret his deliberate delays allowing the Qing to prepare for a final massive battle instead of swiftly attacking Nanjing.

Koxinga's Ming loyalists fought against a majority Han Chinese Bannermen Qing army when attacking Nanjing. The siege lasted almost three weeks, beginning on 24 August. Koxinga's forces were unable to maintain a complete encirclement, which enabled the city to obtain supplies and even reinforcements — though cavalry attacks by the city's forces were successful even before reinforcements arrived. Koxinga's forces were defeated and slipped back to the ships which had brought them.

=== In Taiwan ===
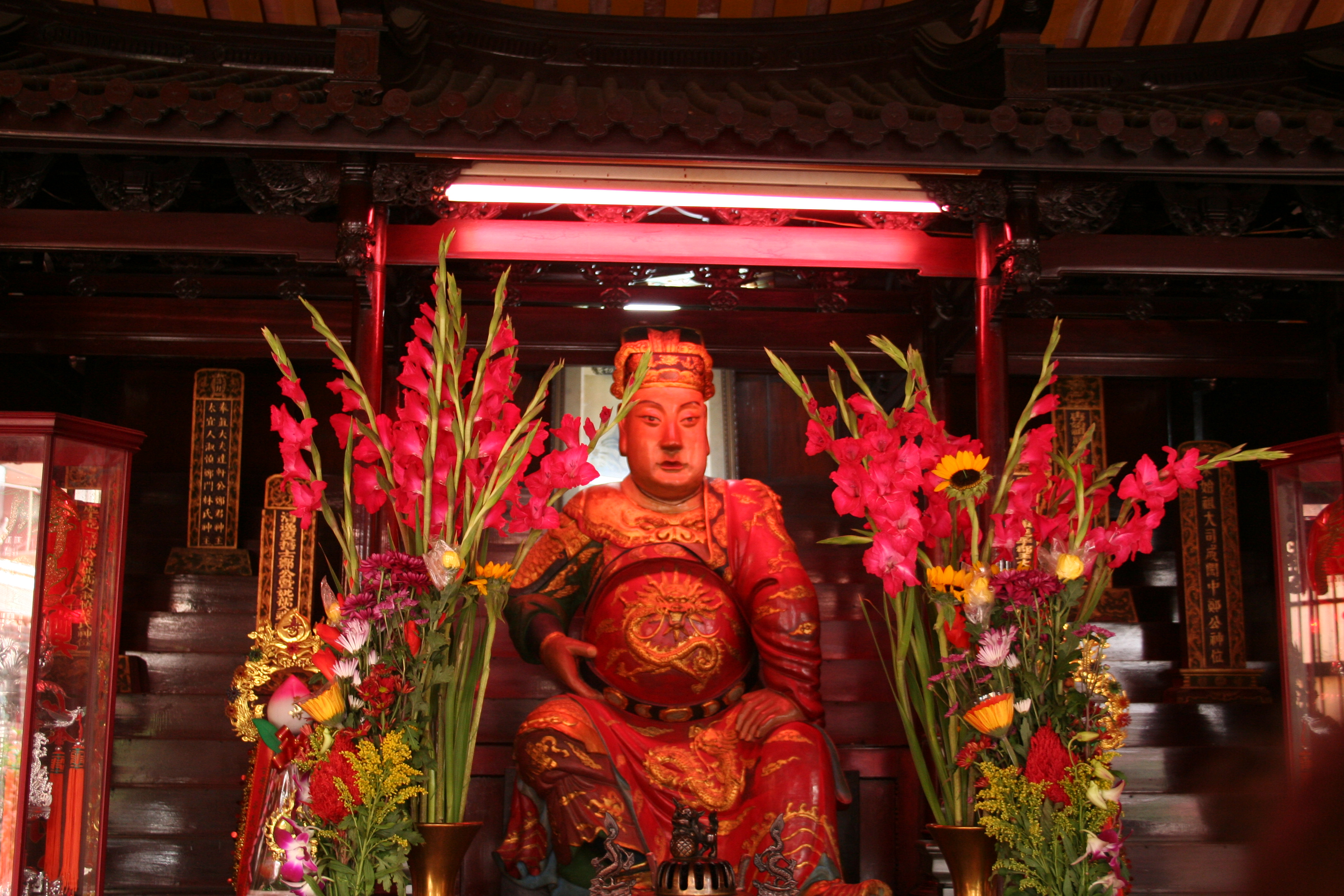
Image of Koxinga Temple in Tainan

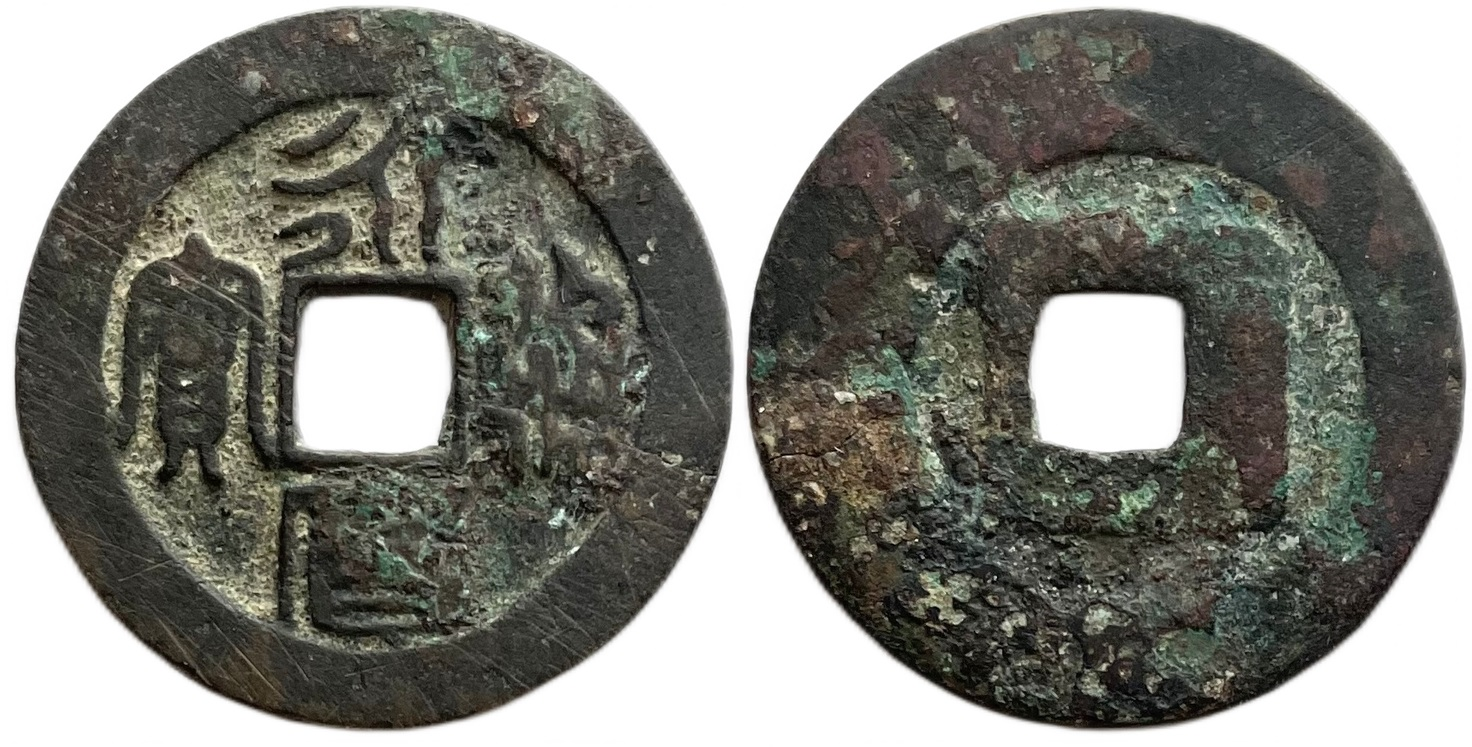
Bronze coin minted in Nagasaki for Koxinga's forces, inscribed Yong Li Tong Bao in seal script

In 1661, Koxinga led his troops on a landing at Lakjemuyse to attack the Dutch colonists in Dutch Formosa. Koxinga said to the Dutch "Hitherto this island had always belonged to China, and the Dutch had doubtless been permitted to live there, seeing that the Chinese did not require it for themselves; but requiring it now, it was only fair that Dutch strangers, who came from far regions, should give way to the masters of the island."

Koxinga was aided by a musketeer regiment of former Portuguese and Dutch slaves. The Taiwanese Aboriginal tribes, who were previously allied with the Dutch against the Chinese during the Guo Huaiyi Rebellion in 1652, now turned against the Dutch during the Siege of Fort Zeelandia by defecting to Koxinga's Chinese forces. The Aboriginals (Formosans) of Sincan defected to Koxinga after he offered them amnesty and proceeded to work for the Chinese, beheading Dutch people. The frontier Aboriginals in the mountains and plains also surrendered and defected to the Chinese on 17 May 1661, celebrating their freedom from compulsory education under Dutch rule by hunting down Dutch people and beheading them and by destroying Dutch Protestant school textbooks.

On 1 February 1662, the Dutch Governor of Formosa, Frederick Coyett, surrendered Fort Zeelandia to Koxinga. According to Frederick Coyett's own self-justifying account written after the siege, Koxinga's life was saved at the end of the siege by a certain Hans Jurgen Radis of Stockaert, a Dutch defector who strongly advised him against visiting the ramparts of the fort after he had taken it, which Radis knew would be blown up by the retreating Dutch forces. This claim of a Dutch defector only appears in Coyett's account and Chinese records make no mention of any defector. In the peace treaty, Koxinga was styled "Lord Teibingh Tsiante Teysiancon Koxin" (simplified Chinese: 大明招讨大将军国姓; traditional Chinese: 大明招討大將軍國姓; pinyin: Dàmíng Zhāotǎo Dàjiāngjūn Guóxìng; Pe̍h-ōe-jī: Tāibêng Chiauthó Tāichiang-kun Kok-sèⁿ; lit. 'Great Ming Commander in Chief of the Punitive Expedition (Lord) Imperial-Surname'). This effectively ended 38 years of Dutch rule on Taiwan. Koxinga then devoted himself to transforming Taiwan into a military base for loyalists who wanted to restore the Ming dynasty.

Koxinga formulated a plan to give oxen and farming tools and teach farming techniques to the Taiwanese Aboriginals, giving them Ming gowns and caps and gifting tobacco to Aboriginals who were gathering in crowds to meet and welcome him as he visited their villages after he defeated the Dutch.

=== In the Philippines ===
In 1662, Koxinga's forces raided several towns in the Philippines. Koxinga's chief advisor was an Italian friar named Vittorio Riccio, whom he sent to Manila to demand tribute from the colonial government of the Spanish East Indies, threatening to expel the Spaniards if his demands were not met. The Spanish refused to pay the tribute and reinforced the garrisons around Manila, but the planned attack never took place due to Koxinga's sudden death in that year after expelling the Dutch from Taiwan.

Koxinga's threat to invade the islands and expel the Spanish was an important factor in the Spanish failure to conquer the Muslim Moro people in Mindanao. The threat of Chinese invasion forced the Spanish to withdraw their forces to Manila. They immediately evacuated their fort on Zamboanga in Mindanao following Koxinga's threats. They left some troops in Jolo and by Lake Lanao to engage the Moro in protracted conflict. They permanently abandoned their colony in the Maluku Islands (Moluccas) and withdraw their soldiers from there to Manila.

=== Death ===
Koxinga died of unspecified illness in June 1662, only a few months after defeating the Dutch in Taiwan, at the age of 37. Contemporary accounts named heat stroke and cold as causes and modern historians suspect malaria. Qing history claimed that he died in a sudden fit of madness when his officers refused to carry out his orders to execute his son Zheng Jing, who had had an affair with his wet nurse and conceived a child with her. Zheng Jing succeeded his father as the Prince of Yanping. According to the historian Roberts Antony, "the death of Zheng Chenggong began the downturn of family fortunes."

== Family ==
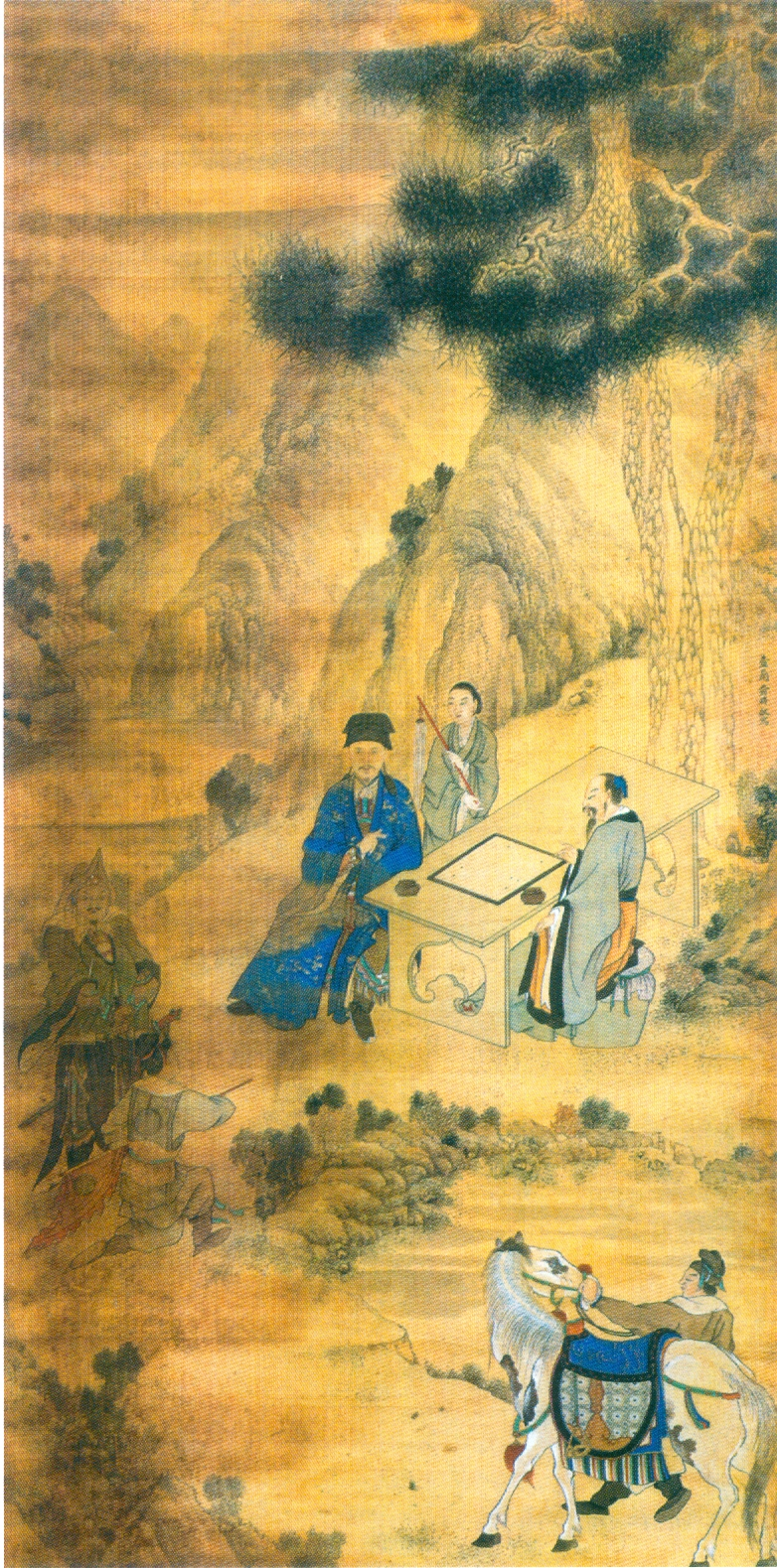
A portrait of Zheng Chenggong painted by Huang Zi 黃梓

Zheng Chenggong's short but eventful career was characterized by family tension and conflicting loyalties. The title of Koxinga ("Lord of the Imperial Surname") was one that Zheng himself used during his lifetime to emphasize his status as an adopted son of the deposed imperial house, so it was also a declaration of ongoing support to the Ming dynasty. Despite his deliberate self-identification as the noble, loyal vassal of a vanquished master, Koxinga's actual relationship with the Longwu Emperor lasted only twelve months or so, beginning in September 1645 and ending with the Emperor's death the following year. Although many secondary sources claim that the two men shared a "close bond of affection", there is an absence of any reliable contemporary evidence on Koxinga's relationship with the Longwu Emperor.

In contrast, Koxinga's father Zheng Zhilong left his Japanese wife not long after the birth of his son; Koxinga was a boy of seven when he finally joined his father on the Fujianese coast. It seems that Zheng Zhilong recognized his son's talent and encouraged him in his studies and the pursuit of a career as a scholar-official, which would legitimize the power the Zheng family had acquired, using sometimes questionable means. Zheng Zhilong's defection to the Qing must have seemed opportunistic and in stark contrast to Koxinga's continued loyalty to the Ming. But it is difficult to deny that in refusing to submit to the Qing, Koxinga was risking the life of his father, and that the subsequent death of Zheng Zhilong could only be justified by claiming loyalty to the Ming. It has even been suggested that Koxinga's fury at the incestuous relationship between his son, Zheng Jing, and a younger son's wet nurse was due to the fact that strict Confucian morality had played such a crucial role in justifying his lack of filial behaviour.

The one possible exception to this may have been his relationship with his mother, which has generally been described as being extremely affectionate, particularly in Chinese and Japanese sources. Their time together, however, was apparently very short – despite frequent entreaties from Zheng Zhilong for her to join him in China, Koxinga's mother was only reunited with her son some time in 1645, and a year later she was killed when the Qing took Xiamen.

A portrait of Zheng was in the hands of Yuchun who was his descendant in the eight generation.

Koxinga's descendants live in both mainland China and Taiwan and descendants of his brother Shichizaemon live in Japan. His descendants through his grandson Zheng Keshuang served as Bannermen in Beijing until 1911 when the Xinhai revolution broke out and the Qing dynasty fell, after which they moved back to Anhai and Nan'an in southern Fujian. They still live there to this day. His descendants through one of his sons Zheng Kuan live in Taiwan.

One of Koxinga's descendants on mainland China, Zheng Xiaoxuan 鄭曉嵐, fought against the Japanese invaders in the Second Sino-Japanese War. His son Zheng Chouyu was born in Shandong in mainland China and called himself a "child of the resistance" against Japan and he became a refugee during the war, moving from place to place across China to avoid the Japanese. He moved to Taiwan in 1949 and focuses his poetry work on building stronger ties between Taiwan and mainland China. Zheng Chouyu identified as Chinese. He felt alienated after he was forced to move to Taiwan in 1949 which was previously under Japanese rule and felt strange and foreign to him. Chouyu is Koxinga's 11th generation descendant and his original name is Zheng Wenji.

=== Consorts and issue ===
- Dong You, Queen of Tungning (董友)
  - Zheng Jing ( 鄭經延平王; 25 October 1642 – 17 March 1681), Prince of Yanping, first son
  - Zheng Cong (輔政公 鄭聰), Duke Fu of Zheng, second son
  - Zheng Yu (鄭裕; 1660–1737), seventh son
- Lady Chuang (莊氏)
  - Zheng Ming (鄭明), third son
  - Zheng Rui (鄭睿), fourth son
  - Zheng Zhi (鄭智; 1660–1695), fifth son
- Lady Wen (溫氏)
  - Zheng Kuan (鄭寬), sixth son
  - Zheng Rou (鄭柔), ninth son
- Lady Shi (史氏)
  - Zheng Wen (鄭溫; 1662–1704), eight son
- Lady Chai (蔡氏)
  - Zheng Fa (鄭發), tenth son
- Unknown:
  - four daughters

=== Concubine ===
In 1661, during the Siege of Fort Zeelandia, Koxinga executed Dutch missionary Antonius Hambroek and took his teenage daughter as a concubine. Other Dutch women were sold to Chinese soldiers to become their "wives". In 1684 some of these Dutch wives were still captives of the Chinese.

=== Personality ===
Koxinga was reputed to be mentally unstable: to have a vicious temper and a tendency towards ordering executions. While this might be explained by the trauma of his family being killed by the Qing army and his mother's reported suicide (in order to prevent capture by the Qing), it was also speculated that he suffered from syphilis, a suspicion held by a Dutch doctor, Christian Beyer, who treated him.

Vittorio Riccio, a Dominican missionary who knew Koxinga, noted that Koxinga held samurai ideals on bravery, used "feigned and hearty laughter" to show anger, and adhered to bushido because of his samurai training and his Japanese upbringing. One Spanish missionary proffered a personal opinion that his bad temper and reported propensity for violence was due to Japanese heritage; however, this same missionary's account of the number of executions attributed to Koxinga was greatly exaggerated.

Koxinga suffered from "depressive insanity" and mental illness according to Dr. Li Yengyue.

== Modern-day legacy and influences ==
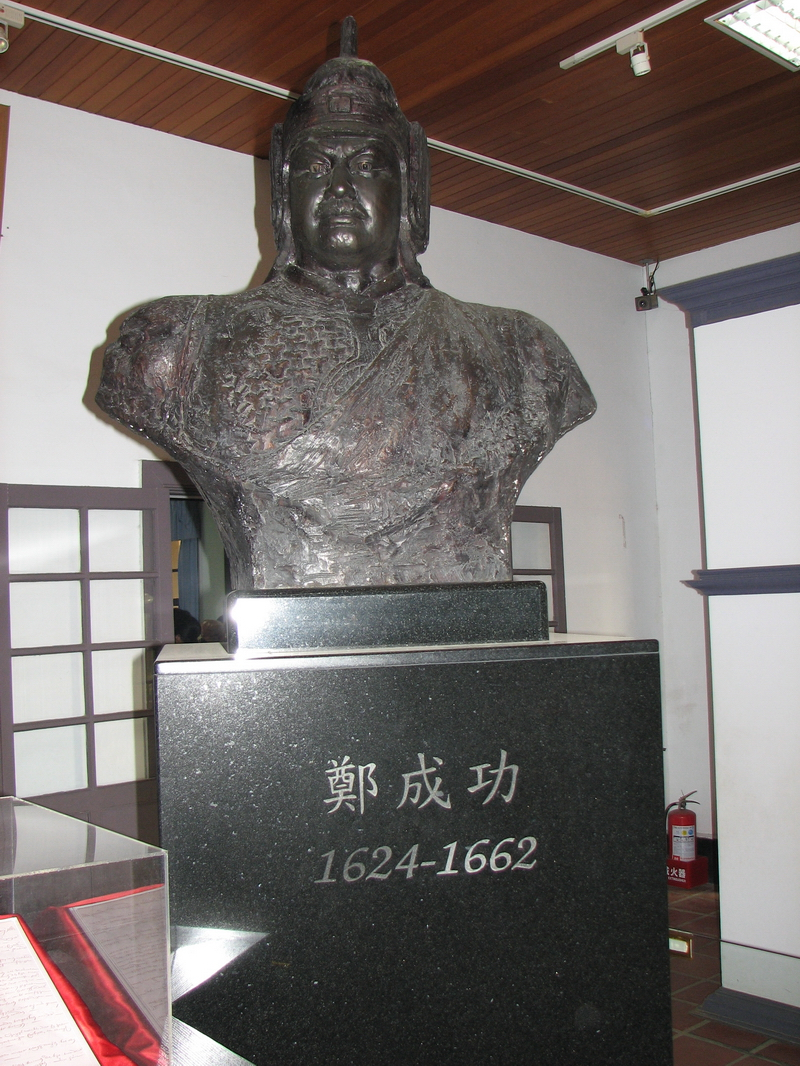
Statue of Koxinga in Fort Zeelandia, Anping, Tainan, Taiwan

=== Worship ===
It is debated whether he was clean-shaven or wore a beard.

Koxinga's legacy is treated similarly on each side of the Taiwan Strait. Koxinga is worshiped as a god in coastal China, especially Fujian, by overseas Chinese in Southeast Asia and in Taiwan. There is a temple dedicated to Koxinga and his mother in Tainan City, Taiwan. The National Cheng Kung University in Tainan, one of the most prestigious universities in Taiwan, is named after him.

Koxinga's army also brought the Qinxi fraternal brotherhood into Taiwan, of which some of his army were members of the organization. In the present day, the Qinxi currently exists in Taiwan. The Hongmen are associated with them.

Tokugawa Japan imported books from Qing China including works on the Zheng family. The Qing built a shrine to commemorate Koxinga to counteract the Japanese and French in Taiwan in the 19th century. Zheng Juzhong's books Zheng Chenggong zhuan was imported to Japan and reprinted in 1771.

=== In modern politics ===
Koxinga has received renewed attention since rumors began circulating that the People's Liberation Army Navy were planning to name their newly acquired aircraft carrier, the ex-Soviet Varyag, the "Shi Lang". Admiral Shi Lang famously defeated Koxinga's descendants in the 1683 Battle of Penghu, thus bringing Taiwan under Qing rule. However, the Chinese government denied all allegations that the vessel would be dedicated to the decorated Qing dynasty admiral.

Koxinga is regarded as a hero in the People's Republic of China, Taiwan, and Japan, but historical narratives regarding Koxinga frequently differ in explaining his motives and affiliation. Japan treats him as a native son and emphasized his maternal link to Japan in propaganda during the Japanese occupation of Taiwan. The People's Republic of China considers Koxinga a national hero for driving the imperialist Dutch away from Taiwan and establishing ethnic Chinese rule over the island. On mainland China, Koxinga is honoured as the "Conqueror of Taiwan, Great Rebel-Quelling General" a military hero who brought Taiwan back within the Han Chinese sphere of influence through expanded economic, trade and cultural exchanges. In China, Koxinga is honoured without the religious overtones found in Taiwan.

The Republic of China, which withdrew to Taiwan after losing the Chinese Civil War, regards Koxinga as a patriot who also retreated to Taiwan and used it as a base to launch counterattacks against the Qing dynasty of mainland China (drawing parallels to the Republic of China's hypothetical reclamation of the mainland, comparing the ROC to the Ming dynasty and the PRC to the Qing dynasty). In Taiwan, Koxinga is honored as the island's most respected saint for expelling the Dutch and seen as the original ancestor of a free Taiwan, and is known as Kaishan Shengwang ("the Sage King who Opened up Taiwan") and as the "Prince of Yanping", referring to the Kingdom of Tungning, which he established in modern-day Tainan.

In Taiwan, Koxinga is remembered and revered as a divine national hero with hundreds of temples, schools, tertiary educations, and other public centers named in his honor. Koxinga is accredited with replacing Dutch colonial rule with a more modern political system. Furthermore, Koxinga transformed Taiwan into an agrarian society through the introduction of new agricultural methods such as the proliferation of iron farming tools and new farming methods with cattle. For these reasons, Koxinga is often associated with "hints of [a] consciousness of Taiwanese independence," although Koxinga himself wanted Taiwan unified with the rest of China. Great care was taken to symbolize support for the Ming legitimacy, an example being the use of the term guan instead of bu to name departments, since the latter is reserved for central government, whereas Taiwan was to be a regional office of the rightful Ming rule of China.

=== In art ===
The play The Battles of Coxinga was written by Chikamatsu Monzaemon in Japan in the 18th century, first performed in Kyoto. A 2001 film titled The Sino-Dutch War 1661 starred Vincent Zhao as Koxinga. The film was renamed Kokusenya Kassen after the aforementioned play and released in Japan in 2002.

The historical novel Lord of Formosa by Dutch author Joyce Bergvelt uses Koxinga as the main character.

=== In video games ===
- Zheng Chenggong appears as a Master in the 2023 Japanese video game Fate/Samurai Remnant, his Servant is the also Chinese general Zhou Yu.

== See also ==
- Anti-Qing sentiment
- Great Clearance (1661–1669)
- Pedro Yan Shiqi
- History of Taiwan
- Kingdom of Tungning
- Koxinga Ancestral Shrine

Zheng Sen House of Koxinga Born: 27 August 1624 Died: 23 June 1662
Regnal titles
New title	Prince of Yanping; May or June 1655 – 23 June 1662	Succeeded by Zheng Jing
Political offices
Preceded by Frederick Coyett (as Governor of Formosa)	Ruler of the Kingdom of Tungning; 14 June 1661 – 23 June 1662	Succeeded by Zheng Xi
