= Li Dan (magnate) =

Chinese merchant (died 1625)

Li Dan/Li Tan
- Died: 1625

Li Dan (Chinese: 李旦 / 李旭; Pe̍h-ōe-jī: Lí Tàn / Lí Tòaⁿ; Christian name: Andrea Dittis; died 1625) or Li Tan or Litõa, was an influential overseas Chinese merchant, Chinese community leader, and pirate. He was a prominent early 17th century Chinese merchant and political figure, originally from Quanzhou in Fujian province.

Li operated out of Spanish Manila as the Captain of the Sangley Chinese there for a time before moving to Hirado, in Japan and becoming a part of the shuinsen trade, with a formal vermillion seal license from the Tokugawa shogunate. He served as head (Kapitan Cina) of the Chinese community in Hirado, and maintained a residence in the English sector of the city.

Pedro Yan Shiqi reportedly been the second of command of Li Dan.

Following his death, Li Dan's business was inherited by Zheng Zhilong, along with his role in the community.
