= Inagaki Chūsei =

Japanese painter

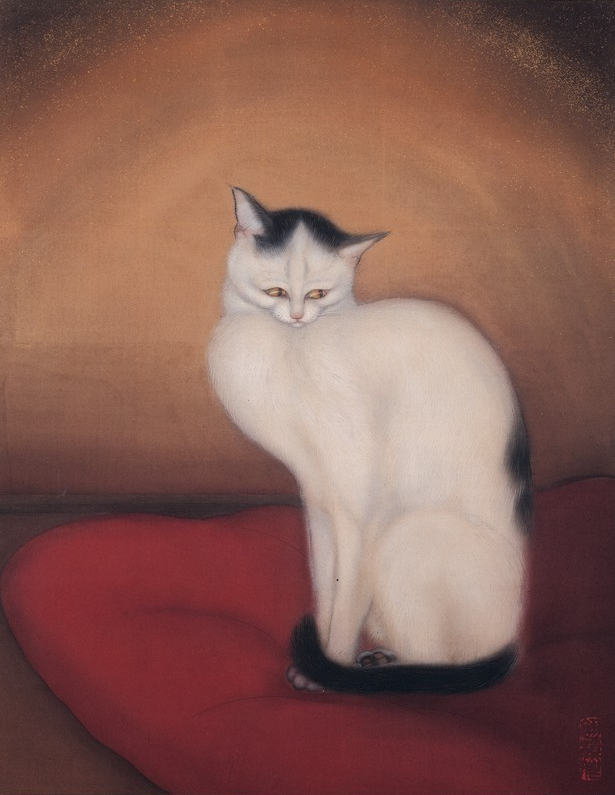
Cat (1919)

Inagaki Chūsei, originally Kōtarō (Japanese:稲垣 仲静; 1897, Kyoto - 24 June 1922, Kyoto) was a Japanese painter in the nihonga style. His younger brother, Inagaki Toshijiro, was a well-known woodcut artist and textile designer who was named a National Treasure.

== Life and work ==
He was the eldest son of Inagaki Takejirō (稲垣竹次郎), a nihonga painter who went under the art name of Chikubu (竹埠) and, later, became a craftsman specializing in lacquer work.

In 1912, he enrolled at the Municipal School of Arts and Crafts then, upon graduating in 1917, attended the Municipal School of Painting (both now part of the Kyoto City University of Arts), completing his education in 1920. While there, in 1919, he had his first success when he exhibited his painting of a cat at the National Painting Association (国画創作協会). In 1922, he was selected to participate in the exhibition of the "Kyūmeikai" (九名会, Nine Famous Ones) but he died that summer from an intestinal inflammation.

In August, his friends and associates organized a memorial exhibition at the Kyoto Prefectural Library. The exhibition featured his flower and bird images (Kachōga) in the styles of the Song and Yuan dynasties, as well as some rather unconventional portraits of courtesans.

== Sources ==
- "Inagaki Chūsei" In: Kyōto no Nihonga 1910–1930 (exhibition catalog). National Museum of Modern Art, Kyoto, 1986. ISBN 4-87642-117-X.
