= Inagaki Toshijiro =

Inagaki Toshijiro (稲垣稔二郎) (March 3, 1902 – June 10, 1963) was a Japanese katazome artist. His given name is also sometimes read as "Nenjiro".

== Early life and education ==
Inagaki was born in Kyoto to Takejiro Inagaki, a painter. He was the second child, and his older brother was Chusei Inagaki. He studied at the Kyoto City University of Arts, and graduated in 1922.

== Career ==
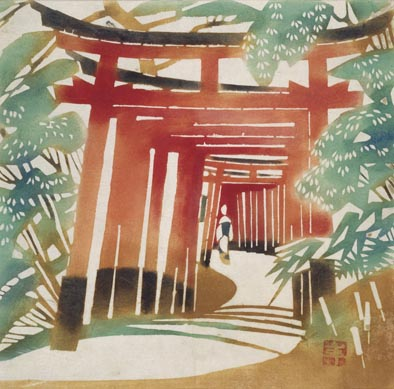
A dyed painting of the Fushimi Inari Shrine

After graduation, Inagaki worked at the Matsuzakaya department store, where he learned to dye cloth. He left the department store in 1931 to focus on his art. In 1938, he began to dye screen paintings using the yuzen method of dyeing. He won an award at the Kokugakai exhibition in 1940, but he entered the spotlight when one of his paintings was selected at the Nitten exhibition in 1941. He was selected twice more after that.

After World War II, he left the Kokugakai and formed the Shinsho Bijutsu Kogei Kai with Tomimoto Kenkichi. He then began dyeing using the katazome method in 1948, and continued to do so for the rest of his life. He was appointed a professor at his alma mater, the Kyoto City University of Arts, in 1958. He was designated a Living National Treasure in 1962, a year before his death from cancer on June 10, 1963.

His work is held by the Art Institute of Chicago and the Kyoto City Kyocera Museum of Art.

== Style ==
His style has been criticized as being too traditional, especially when compared with Chusei's paintings. While Chusei bucked tradition by painting in a realist style, Toshijiro painted nature and famous places in a more typical nihonga style. The brothers works were shown together at an exhibit at the National Museum of Modern Art, Kyoto in 2010.

Inagaki made his dyes from plants gathered in the countryside surrounding Kyoto, and frequently painted the scenery he saw there.
