= Zheng Zhilong =

17th-century Chinese merchant, pirate, and political leader

Zheng Zhilong 鄭芝龍
- 1. Count of Nan'an; 2. Marquis of Pinglu; 3. Duke of Ping; 4. First-class Viscount; 5. Marquis of Tong'an
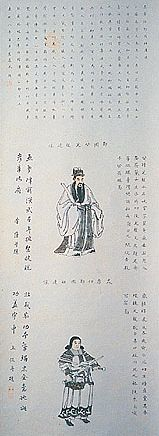
- Illustration of Zheng Zhilong and his son Koxinga, Prince of Yanping
- Born: April 16, 1604; Fujian, Ming dynasty
- Died: November 24, 1661 (aged 57); Caishikou Execution Grounds, Caishikou, Beijing, Qing dynasty
- Burial: Tomb of Zheng Chenggong (鄭成功墓; in present-day Nan'an, Quanzhou, Fujian)
- Wives: Tagawa Matsu; Lady Yan
- Issue: Zheng Chenggong; Shichizaemon Tagawa; Zheng Xi
Names
- Zheng Zhilong; Nicholas Iquan Gaspard
- House: Zheng
- Father: Zheng Shaozu
- Mother: Lady Wang
- Religion: Catholicism
- Occupation: Admiral, merchant, military general, pirate leader, politician

Zheng Zhilong

Chinese name
- Traditional Chinese: 鄭芝龍
- Simplified Chinese: 郑芝龙
Transcriptions
Standard Mandarin
- Hanyu Pinyin: Zhèng Zhīlóng
- Wade–Giles: Cheng Chih-lung
Southern Min
- Hokkien POJ: Tēⁿ Chi-liông

Japanese name
- Kanji: 鄭 芝龍
- Kana: ジェン・ジーロン
- Hiragana: てい しりゅう
Transcriptions
- Revised Hepburn: Tei Shiryū / Jen Jīron

Zheng Zhilong (Chinese: 鄭芝龍; pinyin: Zhèng Zhīlóng; Wade–Giles: Ching Chih-lung; Pe̍h-ōe-jī: Tēⁿ Chi-liông; April 16, 1604 – November 24, 1661), baptismal name Nicholas Iquan Gaspard, was a Chinese admiral, merchant, translator, military general, politician, and pirate leader of the late Ming dynasty who later defected to the Qing dynasty. He was the founder of the Zheng clan and the father of Zheng Chenggong (Koxinga), who would later establish the pro-Ming Kingdom of Tungning in Taiwan, thus making him an ancestor of the House of Koxinga.

During his reign, he controlled a massive and capable fleet of pirates that later united with the Ming dynasty's navy, thereby becoming the Ming admiral that controlled all trade and security in the southern waters off mainland China. He held a powerful maritime empire which controlled more sea than land. After his defection, he was given noble titles by the Qing government, but was eventually executed because of his son's continued resistance against the Qing dynasty.

== Ancestry ==
Zheng was born in Fujian, the son of Zheng Shaozu (Chinese: 鄭紹祖; Pe̍h-ōe-jī: Tēⁿ Siāu-chó͘), a mid-level financial official for the local government and Zheng Shaozu's wife Lady Huang (Chinese: 黃氏; Pe̍h-ōe-jī: N̂g-sī). Just like other typical Zheng clans in Fujian, Zheng Zhilong's ancestors originated in Northern China, but due to the Uprising of the Five Barbarians and Disaster of Yongjia by the Five Barbarians, the Zheng family ended up being among the northern refugees who fled to Southeastern China and settled in Fujian. They later moved to Zhangzhou and moved on to Nan'an. Between 1144 and 1210, Zheng Zhilong's ancestors moved to Longxi county and moved on to Nan'an. Between 1144 and 1210, Zheng Chenggong's ancestor Zheng Boke moved from Qiangtian to Longbei County's Jubei Village (now Longhai Bangshan Town) and his second son was in the early years of the Yuan dynasty. He came to Zhangzhou from the north and opened in Gugu County. Ji Liye is the ancestor of the Longshan Zheng. There is a passage in the Zheng genealogy contained in the Selected Works of Genealogical Data of Fujian and Taiwan Relations, indicating that Zheng's entry into the shackles, "or in Sanshan, Yusong. Yu Chao, is not one place." Among them, the one that arrived in Zhangzhou lived in Longxi at the end of the Song dynasty, which is now the Yangxi Village of Bangshan Town, Longhai. In the Yuan dynasty, it was moved from Yangxi to Lushan, which is now the Fujian Longhai Yanyan. Zhengu County. Subsequently, it was moved from the ancient county to Nan'an. The epitaph of the 13th ancestor of the Anping Zheng of Jinjiang was written by Hong Chengchou, the governor of the Ming dynasty. Hong Chengchou stated in the epitaph of Zheng Chenggong: "Zheng Zhijin was also the first to visit the Fengting Pavilion of Xianyou, the hometown of migration and climbing scales. There is Fengting Bridge, and today its name still exists in the beginning of the ancestors of the ancestors and the number is passed down to the nickname Guo Zhaisheng. The epitaph also mentioned that due to frequent violations, it was forced to move south to the Anping area of Jinjiang, which is now the Anhai area.

== Early life ==
Contemporary biographies tell a possibly apocryphal story of how when Zheng was a child, he and his brothers wanted to eat longan fruit. They found a fruit tree in an enclosed courtyard but whose branches hung over the top of the wall into the street. They threw stones in the hope of knocking some of the fruit clusters loose. It happened to be the courtyard of the governor of Quanzhou City and he was struck by the stones. The boys ran but were caught and hauled before the governor. Due to the child's age and apparent charisma, the governor forgave Zheng and released him, saying "This is the face of one destined for wealth and nobility." The story may or may not be true, but it encapsulated the character of Zheng: he ran wild, grasped at low hanging fruit, got in trouble and came out the better for it. Accounts vary as to the year of his birth. One gives it as 1595, others as 1604 or in between those years like 1600. Most agree he was born in 1604.

Zheng was said to be "very good looking" and when he first came to Japan he was 18 years old.

Zheng left home as a teenager, jumping aboard a merchant ship. Sources vary on why he left home, some saying he slipped his hand up the skirt of one of his father's concubines, others recording his father chasing him through the streets with a stick. Zheng went to Macau where his mother's brother lived (his uncle). Xing Hang deemed the story of him trying to touch his father's concubine is deemed to be "implausible", as he more favored the second version where Zheng Zhilong most likely ran away because he wanted to or his father kicked him out for engaging in constant fighting and vandalism in public. He was baptized as a Catholic in Macau, receiving the Christian name Nicholas Gaspard. His uncle asked him to take some cargo to Hirado, Japan, where he met a rich old Min man named Li Dan, the Japanese city's Kapitan Cina (literally Chinese captain Jan Malay), who became his possible mentor. Li Dan had close ties with the Europeans and he arranged for Zheng to work as an interpreter for the Dutch (Zheng spoke Portuguese which the Dutch could also speak). Zheng spoke Portuguese, Chinese and Japanese. In 1622, when Dutch forces took over the Pescadores archipelago off the Taiwan Strait, Li Dan sent Zheng to the Pescadores to work with the Dutch as a translator in peace negotiations during the war between the Ming and Dutch over the islands. Before leaving Japan, he met and married a local Japanese woman named Tagawa Matsu. He conceived Koxinga with her, leaving Japan before she gave birth in 1624. The terms 合巹 and 隔冬 are used to describe his marriage to Tagawa Matsu in the Taiwan Waiji while the term 割同 was used by Foccardi.

The group of traders working with the Kapitan Cina wanted to arrange for a fellow Chinese woman, Lady Yan to marry Zheng Zhilong.

Zheng Zhilong allegedly had an unknown daughter with another Japanese woman who was not Tagawa Matsu, but this is only mentioned by one writer, Palafox who is very unreliable. This alleged daughter was supposedly among the Japanese who converted to Christianity. The alleged daughter was mentioned in "history of the Conquest of China" by Palafox while Japanese and Chinese accounts make zero mention of any daughter who could hardly have been ignored while reaching her teenager years. It is more likely that the Capitan Cina's daughter Elizabeth could be this alleged daughter of Zheng Zhilong by the mystery Japanese woman, if she was even a real person in the first place.

After Li died in 1625, Zheng acquired his fleet.

== Life as pirate leader ==
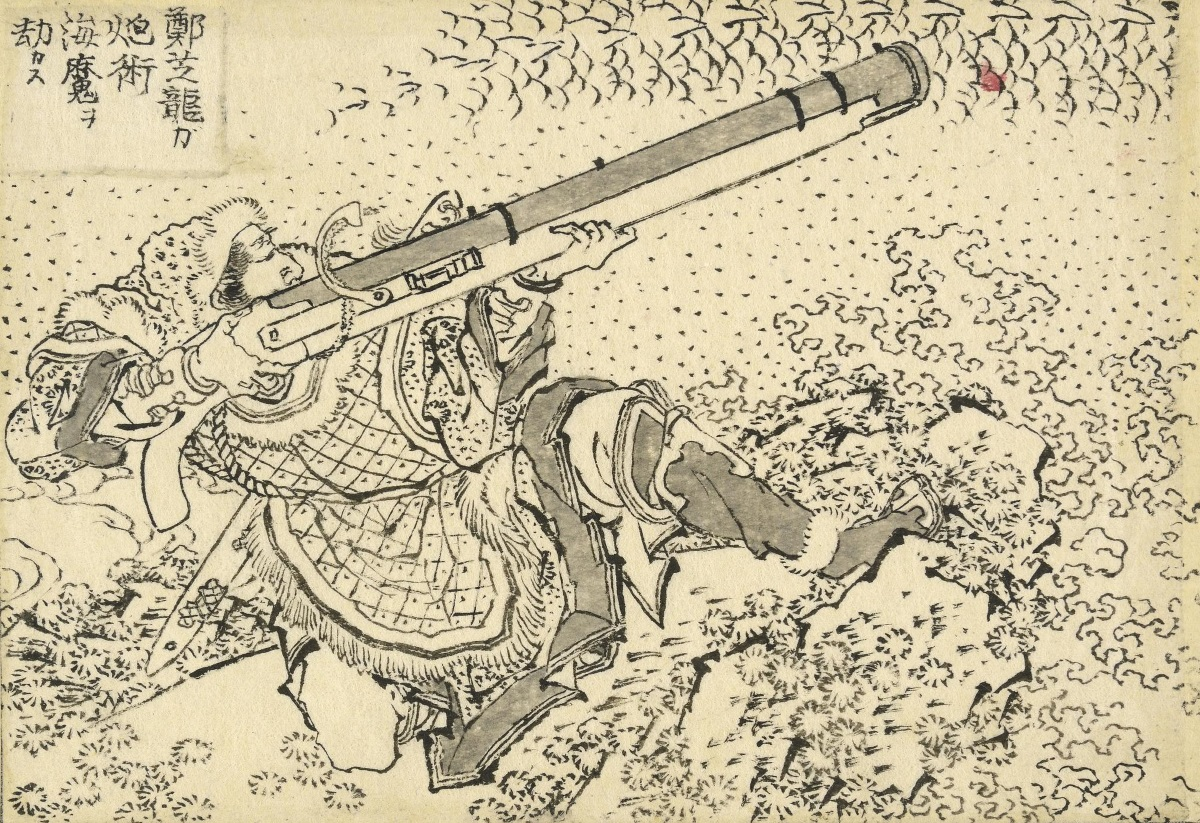
"Zheng Zhilong threatens a sea monster with his skilled gunnery" in Banmotsu ehon daizen zu (万物絵本大全図) by Katsushika Hokusai

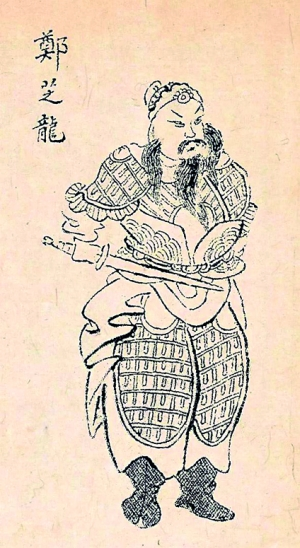
Portrait of Zheng Zhilong in Taiwan Waiji (臺灣外記)

The Dutch East India Company, also called the VOC, wished to gain free trade rights with China and to control and commerce routes to Japan. To accomplish these goals, they collaborated with some Chinese pirates to pressure the Ming dynasty in China to allow trade. Zheng Zhilong initially worked as a translator, although there is debate if he was engaging pirate activities simultaneously. Regardless, most scholars agree that he joined with other Chinese pirates, probably Li Dan or Yan Shiqi. In 1624, Zheng officially became a privateer for the Dutch East India Company after they colonized Taiwan. During this time, he was still aligned with Li Dan. The Dutch did not like how powerful Li Dan was becoming, so they used Zheng Zhilong to weaken Li Dan's position. However, Li Dan died before they could fully complete their plan. With Li Dan dead, Zheng Zhilong became the unopposed leader of the Chinese pirates.

Following his ascension to power, Zheng began to build up his fleets. With access to European sailing and military technology he made his armada of junks superior to the Chinese Imperial navy. Zheng prospered and by 1627 he was leading four hundred junks and tens of thousands of men, including Chinese, Japanese, and even some Europeans. He had a bodyguard of former black slaves who ran away from the Portuguese. By 1630, he controlled all shipping in the South China Sea.

In addition to attacking shipping in the South China Sea, Zheng Zhilong also increased his power by selling protection passes to fisherman and merchants. At the height of his power, no one dared sail without one of his passes for fear of retribution. However, he was not universally hated. He was actually loved by many peasants in the southern provinces of China. He earned their respect by refraining from unnecessary attacks on their towns and giving some stolen grain to them during famines. He also gave unemployed fisherman and sailors jobs in his vast fleet.

=== Shibazhi challenges the Ming fleet ===
Shibazhi (十八芝) were a pirate organization of 18 well-known Chinese pirates, founded in 1625 by Zheng Zhilong. Members included Shi Lang's father Shi Daxuan (施大瑄). They began to challenge the Ming fleet and won a series of victories. In 1628, Zheng Zhilong defeated the Ming dynasty's fleet. The Ming dynasty's southern fleet surrendered to Shibazhi, and Zheng decided to switch from being a pirate captain to working for the Ming dynasty in an official capacity. Zheng Zhilong was appointed major general in 1628. Stories tell of how Cai, the governor who had forgiven Zheng for stoning him so many years ago, came to Zheng and asked for a position in the Ming navy. Zheng granted this request. Whether or not this story is true is unknown, but it reflects the popular appraisal of Zheng who was seen as a benevolent leader.

=== Service under the Ming ===
According to Antony, "By the 1640s the Zheng family, first under the leadership of Zheng Zhilong and then of his son Zheng Chenggong (better known in the West as Koxinga), had built up a sizable maritime empire, which controlled much of South China's seaborne trade. In 1628...he already dominated the lucrative Fujian-Taiwan trade network from his strongholds on Amoy and neighboring islands. He levied 'water fees' (baoshui) on merchant junks and plundered those vessels that refused to pay. By the late 1630s Zheng had eliminated all of his major rivals and had become so powerful that one official described him as 'a whale swallowing up the sea'."

After joining the Ming navy, Zheng and his wife resettled on an island off the coast of Fujian, where he operated a large armed pirate fleet of over 800 ships along the coast from Japan to Vietnam. He was appointed by the Chinese Imperial family as "Admiral of the Coastal Seas". In this capacity he defeated an alliance of Dutch East India Company vessels and junks under renegade Shibazhi pirate Liu Xiang (劉香) on October 22, 1633, in the Battle of Liaoluo Bay. The spoils that followed from this victory made him fabulously wealthy. He bought a large amount of land (as much as 60% of Fujian), and became a powerful landlord.

After eliminating Liu Xiang in 1640s, Zheng Zhilong become one of the richest men in China, with his annual income estimated at three to four times that of the whole Dutch East India Company.

Zheng would continue to serve the Ming dynasty after the fall of the Ming capital Beijing in June 1644. His brother Zheng Zhifeng was made a marquis under the Southern Ming, although he was forced to abandon his post at Zhenjiang by a superior Qing force. After the capture of Nanjing in 1645, Zheng accepted an offer to serve as commander-in-chief of the imperial forces and was ordered to defend the newly established capital in Fuzhou under the Prince of Tang.

=== Surrender to Qing ===
In 1646, Zheng decided to defect to the Manchus and thusly left the passes of Zhejiang unguarded, allowing Manchu forces to capture Fuzhou. His defection was facilitated by Tong Guozhen and Tong Guoqi. His brothers who still controlled most of the Zheng army, and his son Koxinga refused to defect to the Qing and asked him to not surrender. Zheng Zhilong did not listen and the Qing noticed his followers and army had not followed him in his defection, so he was placed under house arrest and taken to Beijing. His bodyguard of former African slaves all died trying to stop the arrest and protect their leader.

The Qing then marched to one of his castles in Anhai to humiliate his Japanese wife Tagawa Matsu. Different accounts say that Tagawa was raped by Qing forces and then committed suicide or that she committed suicide while directing the fight against the Qing. The Qing did not trust Zheng afterwards due to their role in Tagawa's death.

== Death ==
Zheng Zhilong, along with his servants and sons who went with him were kept under house arrest for many years, until 1661. The Qing initially sentenced Zheng and his remaining servants and sons with him to death by lingchi but commuted their sentence to death by decapitation instead. He would later be executed by the Qing government in 1661 at Caishikou Execution Grounds, Caishikou, in Beijing, as a result of his son Koxinga's continued resistance against the Qing regime.
