= Battle of Liaoluo Bay =

Part of the Sino–Dutch conflicts in 1633

- Part of the Sino–Dutch conflicts
Date	July 7 – October 22, 1633
Location	Liaoluo Bay, Kinmen (Taiwan Strait) 3166 code 24.41°N 118.38°E
Result	Ming victory

Belligerents
Ming dynasty	(Dutch East India Company) Dutch East India Company; Chinese pirates

Commanders and leaders
Zheng Zhilong	(Dutch East India Company) Hans Putmans; Liu Xiang

Strength
150 junks	8 warships 50 junks

Casualties and losses
Unknown	250 killed and wounded 2 warships sunk 1 warship captured
- Location within Taiwan Battle of Liaoluo Bay (Eastern China)

The Battle of Liaoluo Bay (Chinese: 料羅灣海戰; pinyin: Liàoluó Wān Hǎizhàn) took place in 1633 off the coast of Fujian, China; involving the Dutch East India Company (VOC) and the Chinese Ming dynasty's navies. The battle was fought at the crescent-shaped Liaoluo Bay that forms the southern coast of the island of Kinmen. A Dutch fleet under Admiral Hans Putmans was attempting to control shipping in the Taiwan Strait, while the southern Fujian sea traffic and trade was protected by a fleet under Brigadier General Zheng Zhilong. This was the largest naval encounter between Chinese and European forces before the Opium Wars two hundred years later.

== Background ==
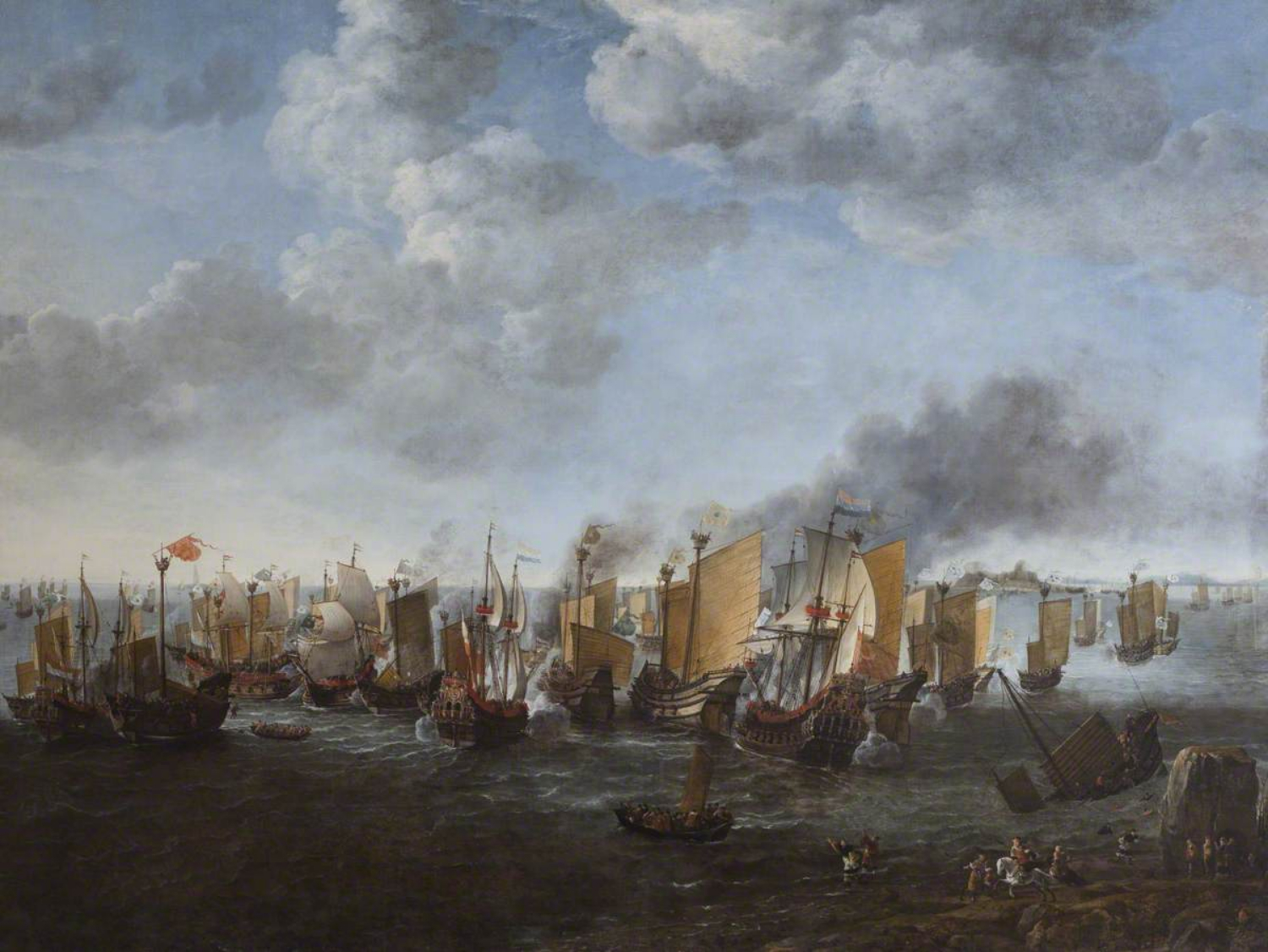
Dutch East India Company and Chinese Attack on Chinese Pirates in the Bay of Xiamen (Amoy), 9 February 1630 by Simon de Vlieger (1650), depicting the Dutch collaborating with Zheng Zhilong against Li Kuiqi

The Ming dynasty of the 17th century had relaxed its age old practice of banning maritime trade, allowing the Chinese coast to bustle with commercial activity. The Ming navy, however, had been poorly maintained and ineffectual, such that pirates had practical control of this trade. The pirate leader Zheng Zhilong in particular dominated the Fujian coast, his ships decked with European cannons and mercenaries from Japan to Africa. The Ming court, in its decline, recruited Zheng Zhilong in 1628 rather than to try and destroy him. Although the more piratical elements of his fleet deserted him after he surrendered to the Ming, Zheng's new status as a Ming admiral allowed him to go after his former lieutenants. He was aided in this anti-pirate campaign by the Dutch under the governor of Formosa (Taiwan), Hans Putmans.

The Dutch had been trying to gain permission to trade freely in China, without much success. In 1622 they established a position on the Pescadores, but were militarily defeated by the Ming in a war lasting from 1623 to 1624, and this forced the Dutch to withdraw from the Pescadores and establish themselves on Taiwan instead. Zheng Zhilong had promised to lobby on behalf of the Dutch if they in turn helped defeat his former subordinate Li Kuiqi (李魁奇); however, when this was accomplished in February 1630, Putmans received no guarantees about trade. Unbeknownst to Putmans, Zheng Zhilong had not been able to fulfill his promise because he then served a new Governor of Fujian, Zou Weilian, who was hostile to the Dutch. Putmans believed that Zheng Zhilong had turned back on his promises, and decided that the Chinese bureaucracy would respond better to violence since he saw that pirates like Zheng Zhilong were recruited into officialdom. As Zheng Zhilong was preparing to attack the pirates Liu Xiang and Li Guozhu (李國助), Putmans attacked Zheng's base in Amoy by surprise on 7 July 1633.

== Dutch surprise attack ==
Zheng Zhilong had adapted European technology throughout his maritime career, decking his ships with European cannons and mercenaries, and in 1633 he had built a new fleet of 30 ships according to European designs: whereas most Chinese junks held at most eight smaller cannons, Zheng's new ships had two reinforced gundecks that could hold up to thirty-six large guns, shooting out of Western-inspired gunports. According to a Dutch account, these "large, beautiful war junks were equipped with large cannons, some of them having more than our own warships." Putmans would later write about these ships in admiration: "Never before in this land so far as anyone can remember, has anyone seen a fleet like this, with such beautiful, huge, well-armed junks."

However, the new fleet was not given a chance to prove its worth, for it offered no resistance against the Dutch as they sailed around Gulang Island into the harbour of Amoy, thinking they were friendly. The Dutch fired at the Chinese fleet without warning. The ships had not been crewed yet and were filled with workers, who jumped ship. As soon as it was apparent that the Chinese would offer no retaliation, Putmans ordered his men to burn the ships to save powder. Three large junks escaped being burned or hacked to pieces and the Dutch suffered only one casualty — a sailor who had died setting a fire.

This time the 'red-haired ghosts' [Dutch] attacked Xiamen and, except Zhilong’s ships, the official ships were burned, with only five ships surviving.

— Zeng Ying (d. 1651)

Following the destruction of Zheng Zhilong's fleet, the Dutch roamed the seas with impunity, pillaging villages and capturing vessels. The pirates Liu Xiang and Li Guozhu joined Putmans, and for a time it seemed the Dutch were becoming the head of a new pirate coalition that operated off the coast of China, with at least 41 pirate junks and 450 Chinese soldiers. Putmans hoped these piratical activities would force China to agree to his demands for free trade, but they had the opposite effect; Putmans's actions had united the political enemies Zheng Zhilong and Zou Weilian together. Planning a counterattack, Zheng rebuilt his fleet as Zou gathered commanders from all over the Fujian coast. Zheng also recruited locals willing to join by rewarding each volunteer with two pieces of silver. If the battle lasted longer than expected, the reward would be increased to five. Zheng put the locals on 100 small fire boats, manned by 16 people each. If a boat set fire to one Dutch ship, they would be rewarded with 200 pieces of silver. If they presented a Dutch head, they would be rewarded with 50. Zheng Zhilong bided his time building his fleet even as the Dutch gathered strength from the pirates joining them, and he forestalled the Dutch by impersonating Chinese officials offering fake promises of free trade. In this way he also learned of the Dutch plans from their replies. His stalling bore fruit, as the typhoon season brought gales that hit the Dutch fleet, incapacitating four of its ships. In October 1633, now ready to strike, Zheng Zhilong sent a derogatory message to Putmans: "How can a dog be suffered to lay his head on the pillow of the emperor's resting place?" and brought his fleet to the Dutch anchorage at Liaoluo Bay.

== Chinese counterattack ==
The Dutch East India Company's fleet consisted of the warships Broeckerhaven, Slooterdijck, Wieringen, Perdam, Zeeburg, Koudekerke, Zalm and Bleiswijk. The Dutch had anchored at Liaoluo Bay off Kinmen Island with these eight vessels and fifty junks belonging to their Chinese pirate allies flying the VOC flag. Zheng, on the other hand, had around 150 junks consisting of imperial ships, merchant ships, and his own personal vessels. Fifty of these were large junks.

Their huge ships are difficult to turn, and when they encounter shallow sandy areas, they cannot move. And the Dutch people are not good at fighting, so frequently they are defeated in war.

— History of Ming

The decisive encounter occurred in October when Zheng's fleet engaged the Dutch warships and fifty junks from Chinese pirate allies. The Dutch and pirate forces were lured into Liaoluo Bay and encircled by the Ming fleet, causing the pirates to attempt to flee in a panic. Zheng ordered his fleet to ignore the pirates and focus on attacking the Dutch fleet. Knowing that the Chinese ships could not match the Dutch ships in a gun battle, Zheng Zhilong instead used fireships. In order to fool the Dutch to expect otherwise, Zheng chose to use large warjunks as the fireships, decking them with cannons and soldiers (who were equipped with bamboo tubes and were to jump overboard just before crashing the ship into the enemy fleet). The Dutch did not expect the large warjunks to come straight at them and did not even have time to raise their anchors. The Dutch captains panicked and tried to saw through the anchor cords but it was too late. Ming fireships set fire to the Broeckerhaven. Slooterdijck was hooked on by four junks. After repulsing two boarding attempts, the Dutch warship was defeated and captured. Some sources state that Wieringen was sunk by cannon from Ming warships, but in fact she survived and foundered in 1636 off Malacca. Hans Putmans fled with the Perdam, Zeeburg, Wieringen and Bleiswijk to Taioan. His pirate allies, most of which had fled at the beginning of the battle, were then defeated in turn. The Koudekerke was surrounded, boarded, and sunk; the Zalm was sent to her relief but got surrounded also. They were both initially assumed lost by Putmans but later it was discovered that the Zalm had been able to withdraw to Cochinchina. Dutch vessels were able to outsail the pursuing Chinese ships by sailing close to the wind, since European rigging at the time were more complex than Chinese ones and performed better in that situation.

Although [Dutch] sails are clever, the cleverness is limited to contrary winds. In favorable winds they are not so good. A thing cannot be ingenious in all aspects—this is simply a principle of nature. If a Chinese ship runs swiftly with favorable winds, [the Dutch ship] will fall behind. So when being pursued by a red-hair’s ship, one should simply turn the rudder and run with the wind and thus one can outrun them. Against the wind, however, their ships seldom lose.

— Yu Yonghe

== Aftermath ==
Ming officials hailed the victory as a "miracle at sea", as Zou Weilian observed that people had felt "ever since the red barbarians arrived... this kind of victory had been extremely rare". The victory at Liaoluo Bay had reestablished the prestige and authority of China in the Taiwan Strait, as Hans Putmans ceased his piratical activities on the Chinese coast. Putmans's superiors in Batavia especially ordered him to stay away from China and "out of harm's way so [Dutch ships] won't be exposed to the kind of fury and resolution the Chinese displayed at Liaoluo Bay." However, Putmans felt that his plan had not came to naught, since the Dutch "showed what damage and disruption we can cause them, and it appears that even though they held the field, destroyed two of our yachts, and drove us from their coast, they still came seeking peace with us, and have granted us better trade than ever."

Zheng Zhilong also prospered. He had earned Zou Weilian's respect through this battle. Zou recommended Zheng for promotion in a memorial to the throne but Zheng, in his newfound fame as someone who could keep the Dutch under control, used his influence to remove Zou from power. Now that Zheng had removed political opposition, he was free to grant the Dutch trading privileges, which was what both Zheng and Putmans wanted originally. Since Zheng defeated the Dutch using conventional means and made peace with them afterwards, he did not rebuild the European-styled ships that he lost in 1633. The pirate Liu Xiang attempted to renew the piratical alliance with the Dutch in 1634, but Putmans replied that the current situation suited the Dutch well and refused. Liu Xiang's pirate gang was eventually eliminated in the 1640s by Zheng Zhilong, who came to hold uncontested hegemony over the overseas Chinese trade. He had become one of the richest men in China, with his annual income estimated at three to four times that of the whole Dutch East India Company.
