= Penghu Tianhou Temple =

Temple in Magong City, Penghu, Taiwan

Coordinates: 23.5648°N 119.5639°E

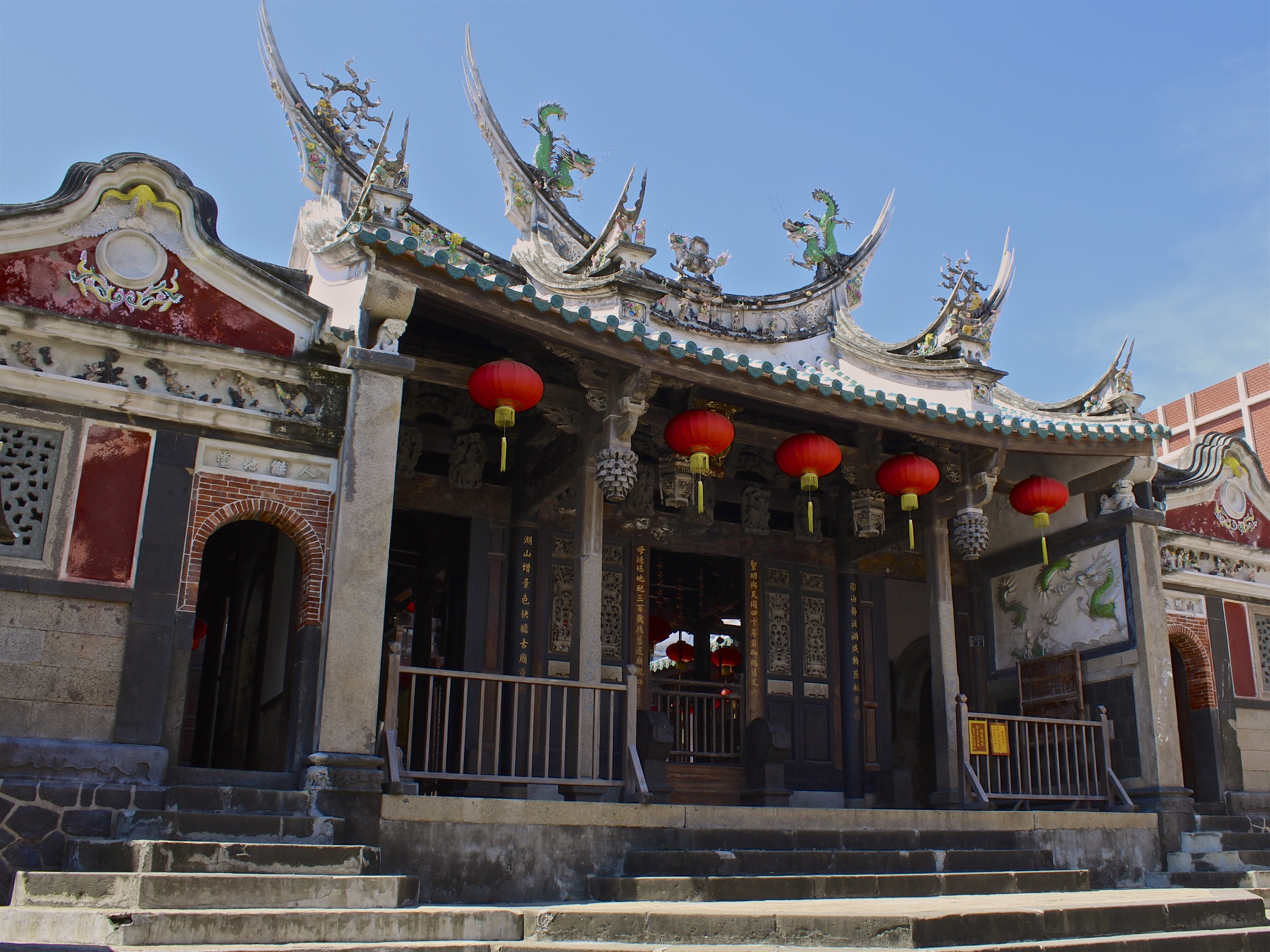
- The temple entrance (2017)
- Traditional Chinese: 天后宮
- Simplified Chinese: 天后宫
- Literal meaning: Palace of the Heavenly Empress
Transcriptions
Standard Mandarin
- Hanyu Pinyin: Tiānhòu Gōng
- Wade–Giles: Tʻien-hou Kung

Tianfei Temple
- Traditional Chinese: 天妃宮
- Simplified Chinese: 天妃宫
- Literal meaning: Palace of the Heavenly Consort
Transcriptions
Standard Mandarin
- Hanyu Pinyin: Tiānfēi Gōng
- Wade–Giles: Tʻien-fei Kung

Mazu Temple
- Traditional Chinese: 媽祖宮
- Simplified Chinese: 妈祖宫
- Literal meaning: Palace of the Maternal Ancestor
Transcriptions
Standard Mandarin
- Hanyu Pinyin: Māzǔ Gōng
- Wade–Giles: Ma-tsu Kung

Niang Temple
- Traditional Chinese: 娘宮
- Simplified Chinese: 娘宫
- Literal meaning: Palace of the Lady
Transcriptions
Standard Mandarin
- Hanyu Pinyin: Niánggōng
- Wade–Giles: Niang Kung

Maniang Temple
- Traditional Chinese: 媽娘宮
- Simplified Chinese: 妈娘宫
- Literal meaning: Palace of the Mother-&-Lady
Transcriptions
Standard Mandarin
- Hanyu Pinyin: Māniáng Gōng
- Wade–Giles: Ma-niang Kung

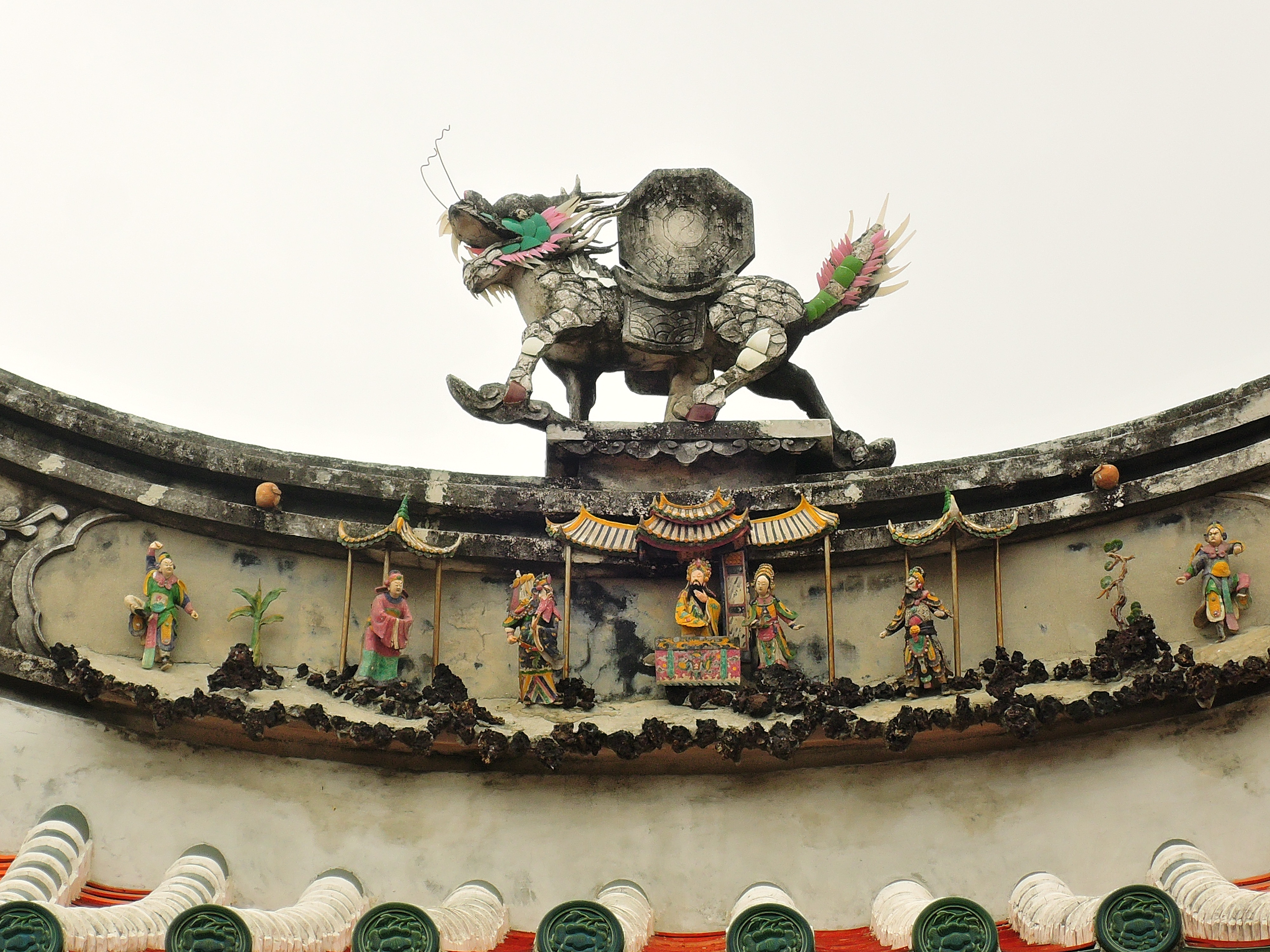
- Roof decorations (2018)

Temple of the Honorable Mother
- Traditional Chinese: 娘媽宮
- Simplified Chinese: 娘妈宫
- Literal meaning: Temple of the Lady-&-Mother
Transcriptions
Standard Mandarin
- Hanyu Pinyin: Niángmā Gōng
- Wade–Giles: Niang-ma Kung

Temple of the Mother
- Traditional Chinese: 媽宮
- Simplified Chinese: 妈宫
- Literal meaning: Temple of the Mother
Transcriptions
Standard Mandarin
- Hanyu Pinyin: Māgōng
- Wade–Giles: Ma Kung

The Penghu Tianhou Temple is a temple dedicated to the sea goddess Mazu located on Zhengyi Street in Magong City, Penghu, Taiwan. It is usually considered the oldest Mazu temple in Taiwan and, despite differences in characters, is the namesake of the surrounding city of Magong. It is open from 7:00 am to 5:30 pm daily.

== Name ==
The original name of the site was the Niangma Temple ("Temple of the Honorable Mother)". It was renamed the Tianfei Temple ("Temple of the Princess of Heaven") following its rebuilding in the 16th century. The present Chinese name of the temple followed Mazu's elevation by the Qing and translates as the "Palace of the Queen of Heaven" and is sometimes romanized as the Tienhou Temple. Its English name is also sometimes transcribed as the Matsu Temple.

== History ==
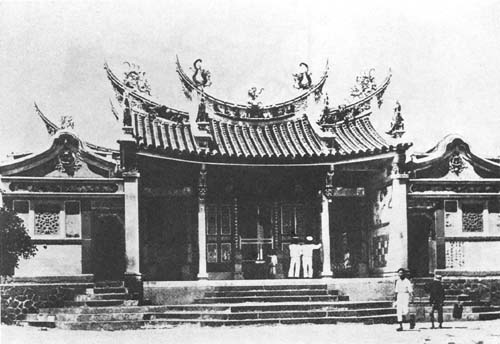
The Mazu Temple c. 1919.

The temple claims to be the oldest in Taiwan, possibly dating to the early Ming in the 15th century. It was supposedly destroyed by "Japanese" pirates and rebuilt in the 16th century. It was enlarged following Yu Dayou's 1563 victory over the pirates at Putian and again after another imperial victory in 1592, a date sometimes given as its foundation. Alternatively, its construction is credited to the Hoklo in 1593 or 1604. A 1604 stele recording the ultimatum Yu Dayou's son Zigao gave to the Dutch to abandon Taiwan was discovered at the temple in 1919. In 1622, the Dutch seized the area and erected a fort; following their conquest by Yu Zigao's forces two years later, the temple was again remodeled.

Magong grew up around the temple and was named for it. Under Japanese rule, the port of Magong was a major base of the Imperial Japanese Navy. Its characters were changed in 1920 but it retained the same pronunciation in Japanese and English as before. In Mandarin, however, the names no longer match, since the tone of the first syllable shifted from first to third. The present temple is largely the result of a 1922 renovation, mostly employing Tangshan, Guangzhou, and Chaozhou artists.

== Architecture ==
The temple complex consists of a front, main, and back temple with an extra row of houses ("guarding dragons") on either side. It is built on the slope of the hill, with the temples rising from front to back. The front temple is also known as the Shanchuan Temple. The temple has a high and sweeping "swallowtail" roof.

== Artwork ==
The temple is filled with wood carvings in the Chaozhou style. The name plaque on the front temple is surrounded by three dragons. The swastikas on the main hall's door panels are taken to represent eternal prosperity; wealth and happiness are also symbolized by the doors' flowers and birds. The columns have lion and paired rabbit bases.

The main idol of Mazu is said to be more than 700 years old, carved from a single piece of solid wood weighing about 150 kilograms (330 lb).

== Legacy ==
The temple is one of the landmarks of Taiwan turned into moe figures in artist Chih Yu's We Stay, We Live.

== Gallery ==
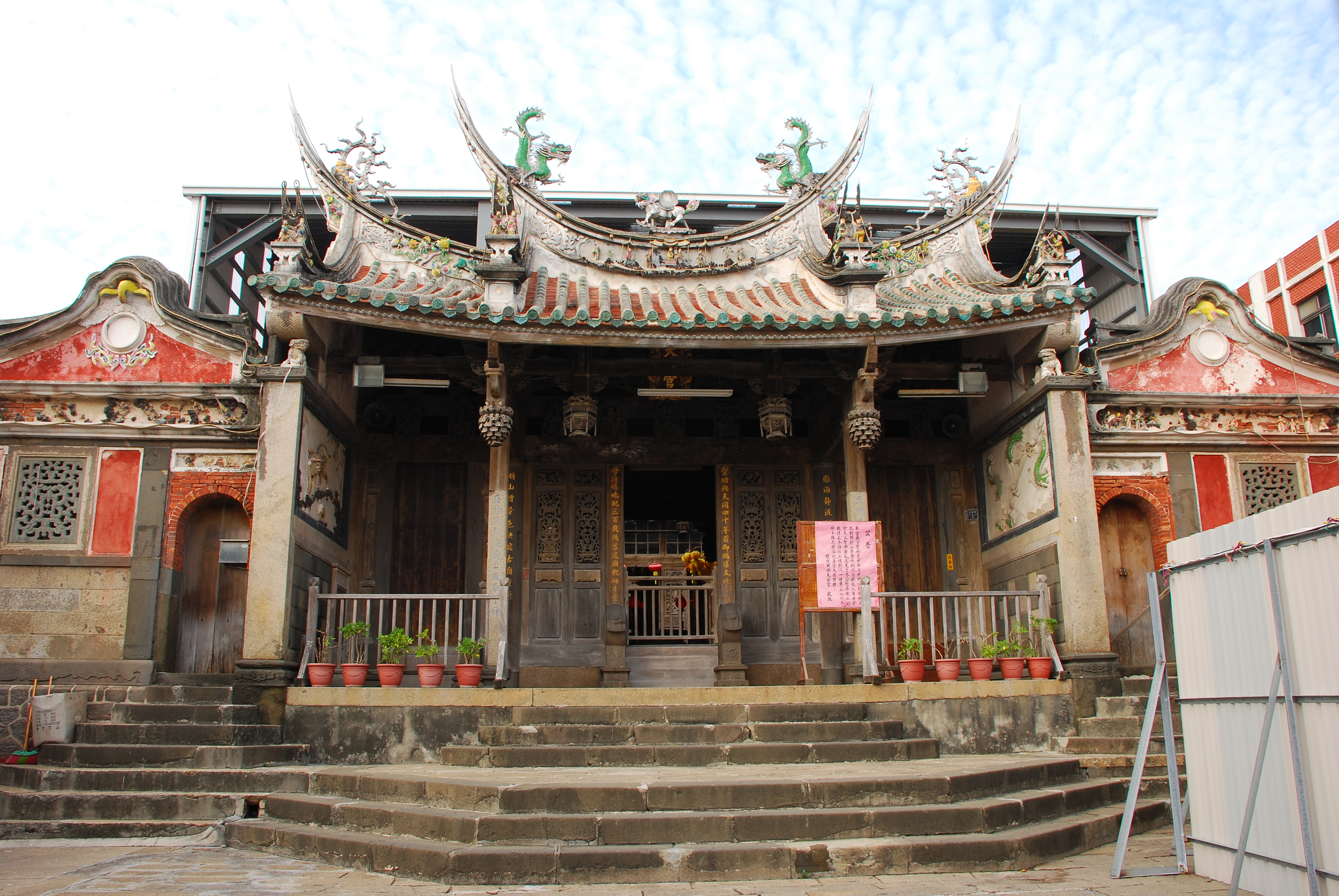
Entrance (2013)

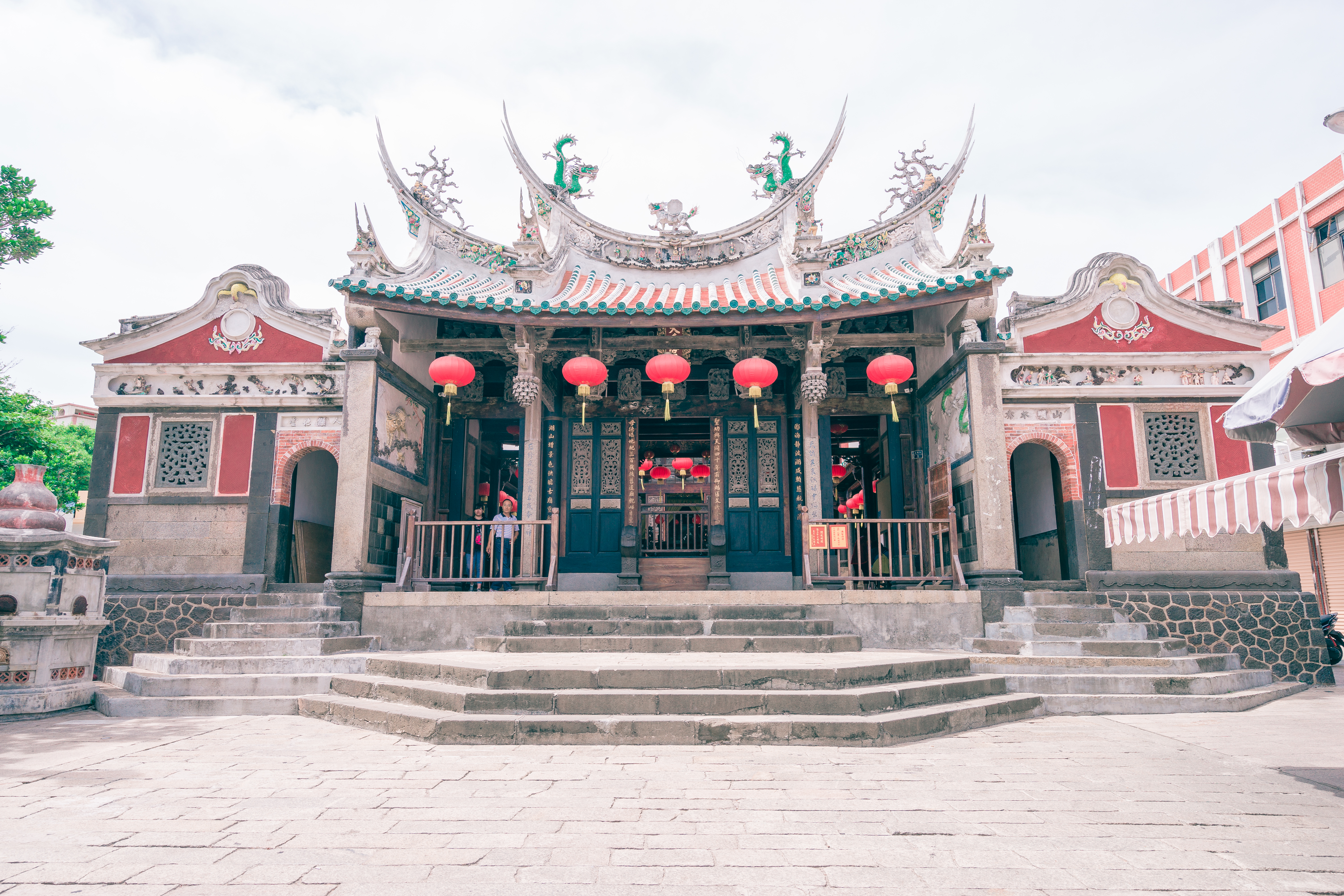
Entrance 2015

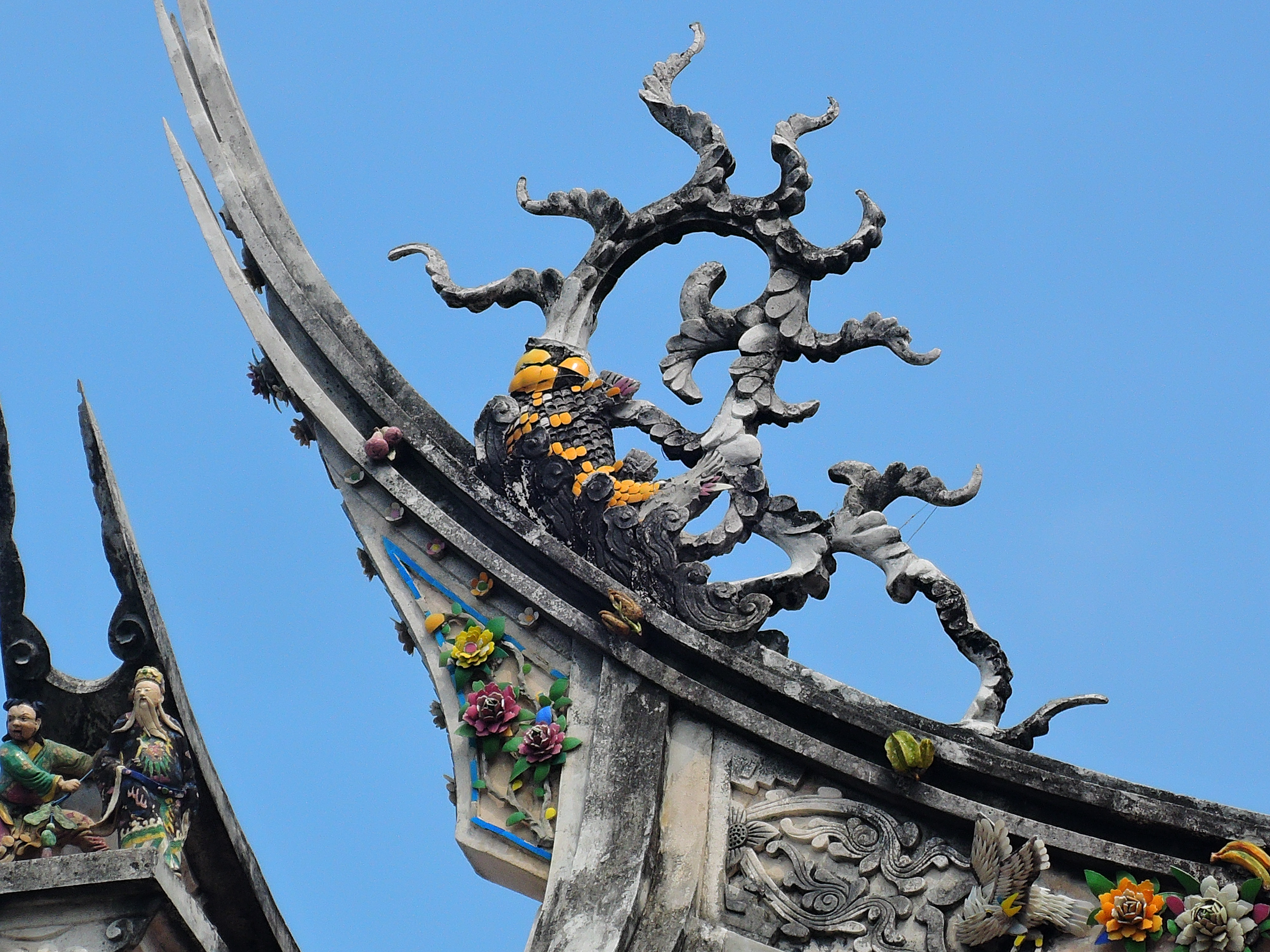
Roof decoration: carp and water (clay)

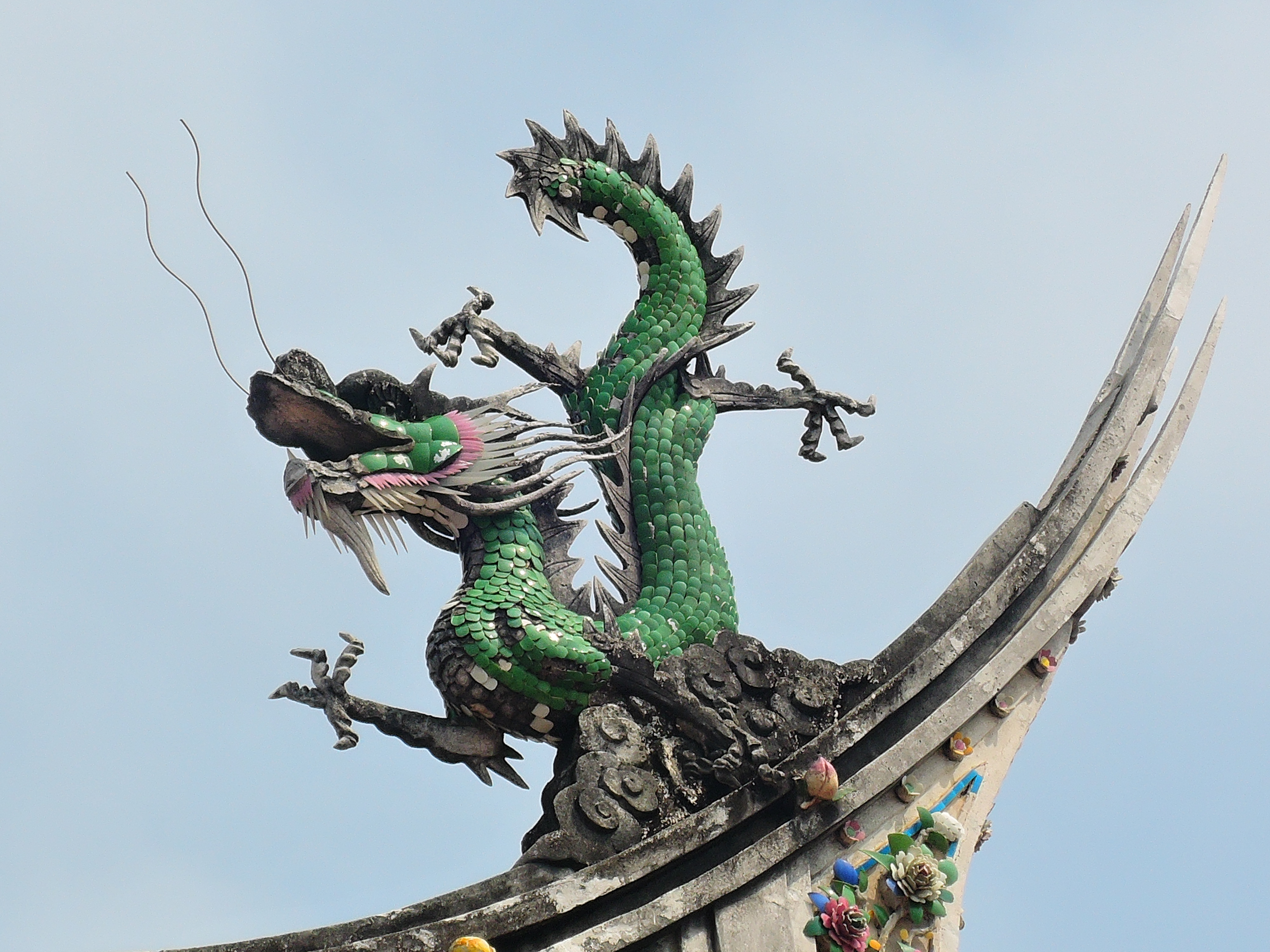
Roof decoration: four-fingers dragon (clay )

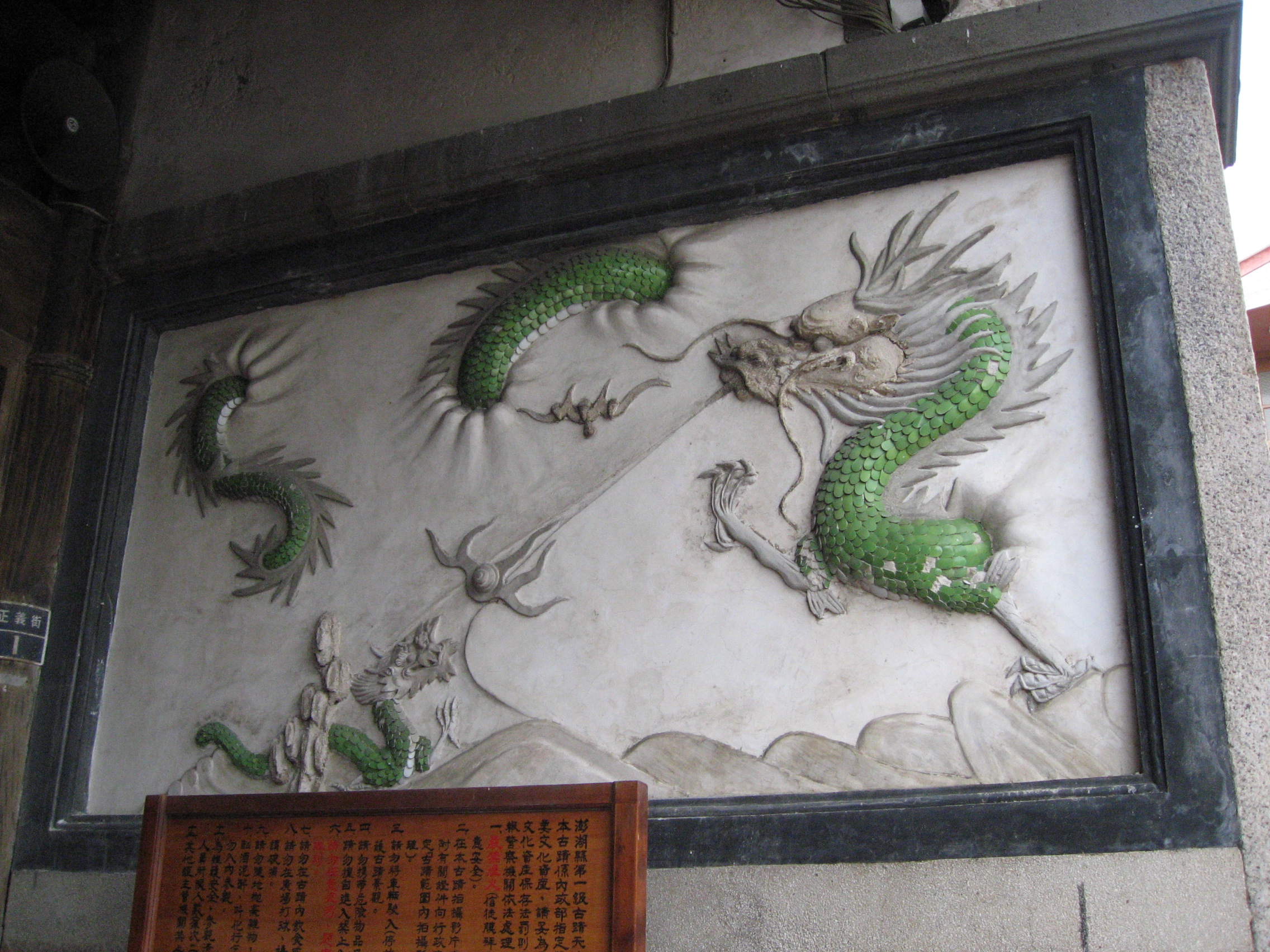
Wall decoration dragon beside entrance

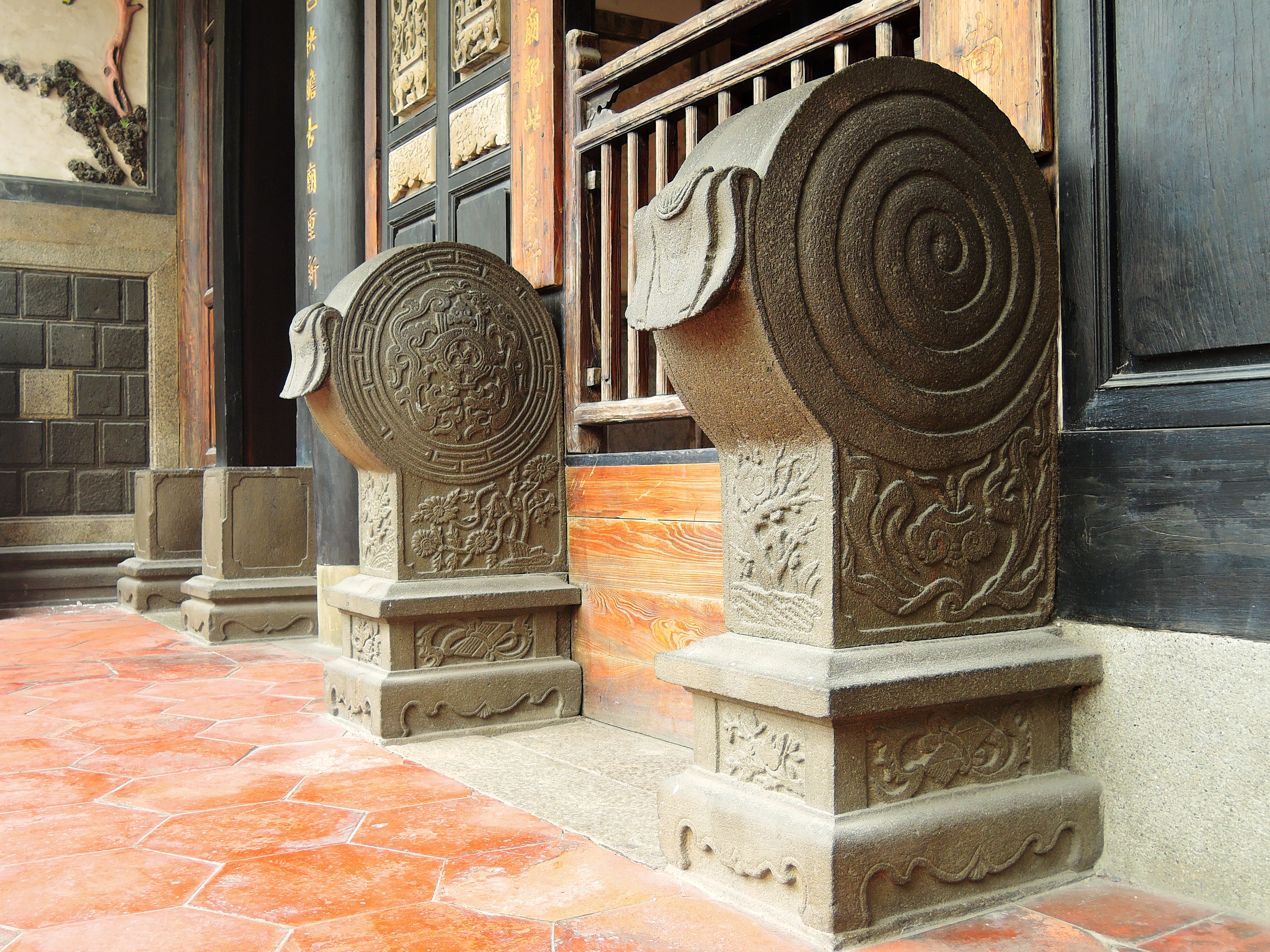
The Entrance of the Hall

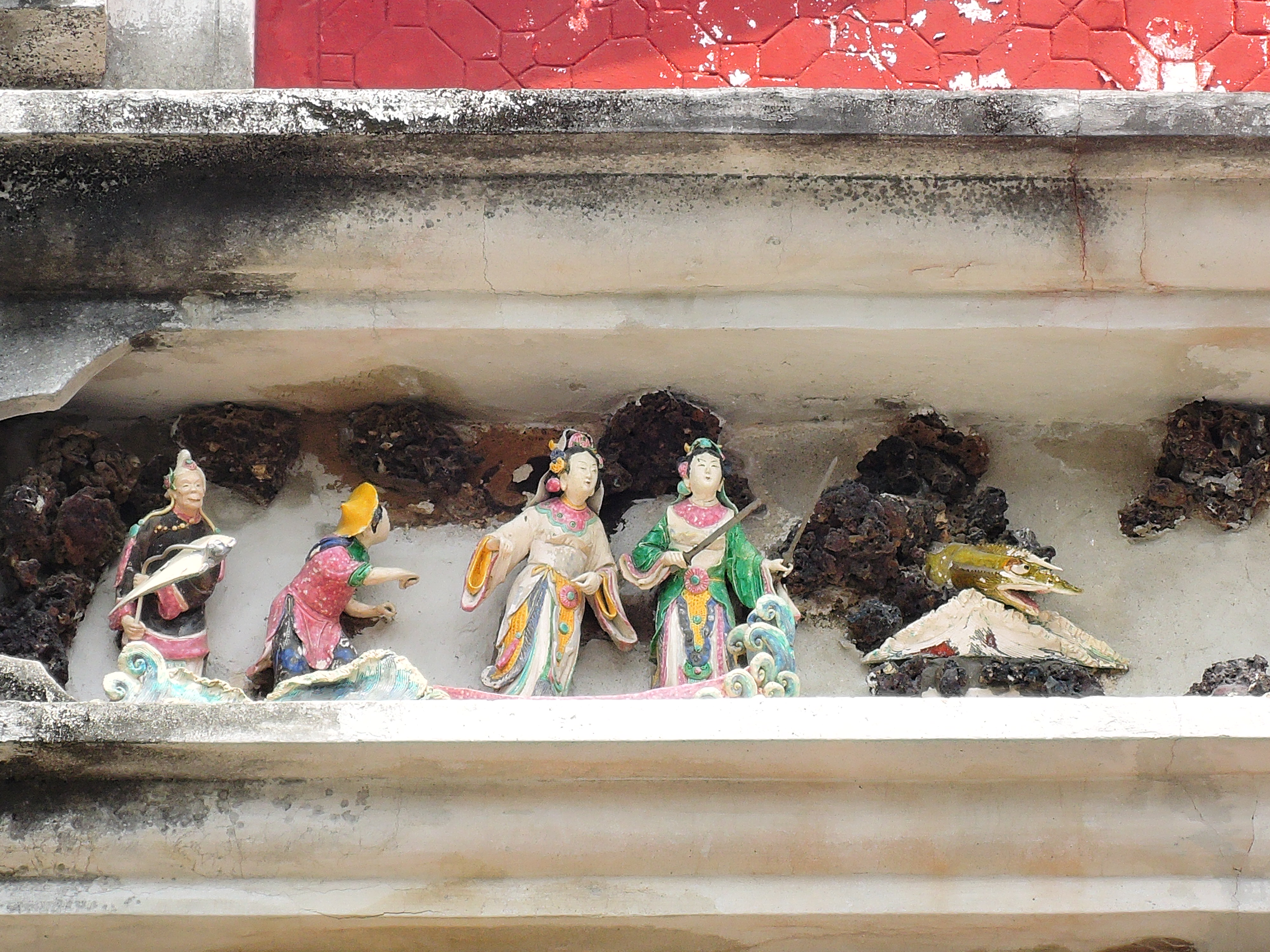
Wall decoration: 【Chinese folk story: Legend of the White Snake (白蛇傳)】Buddhist monk called Fahai (法海) uses her powers to flood the temple and drowns many innocent people.

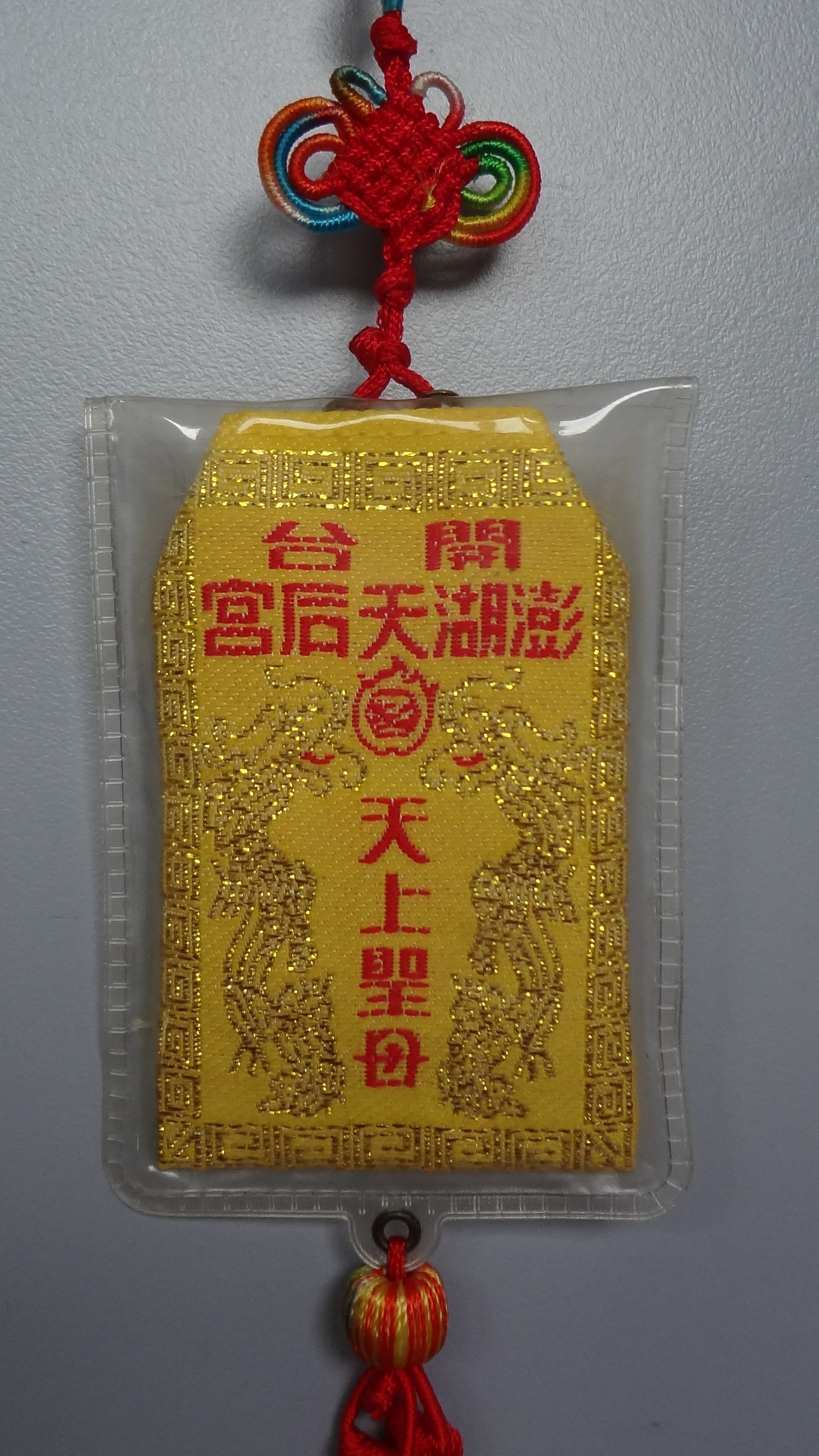
Charm from the temple

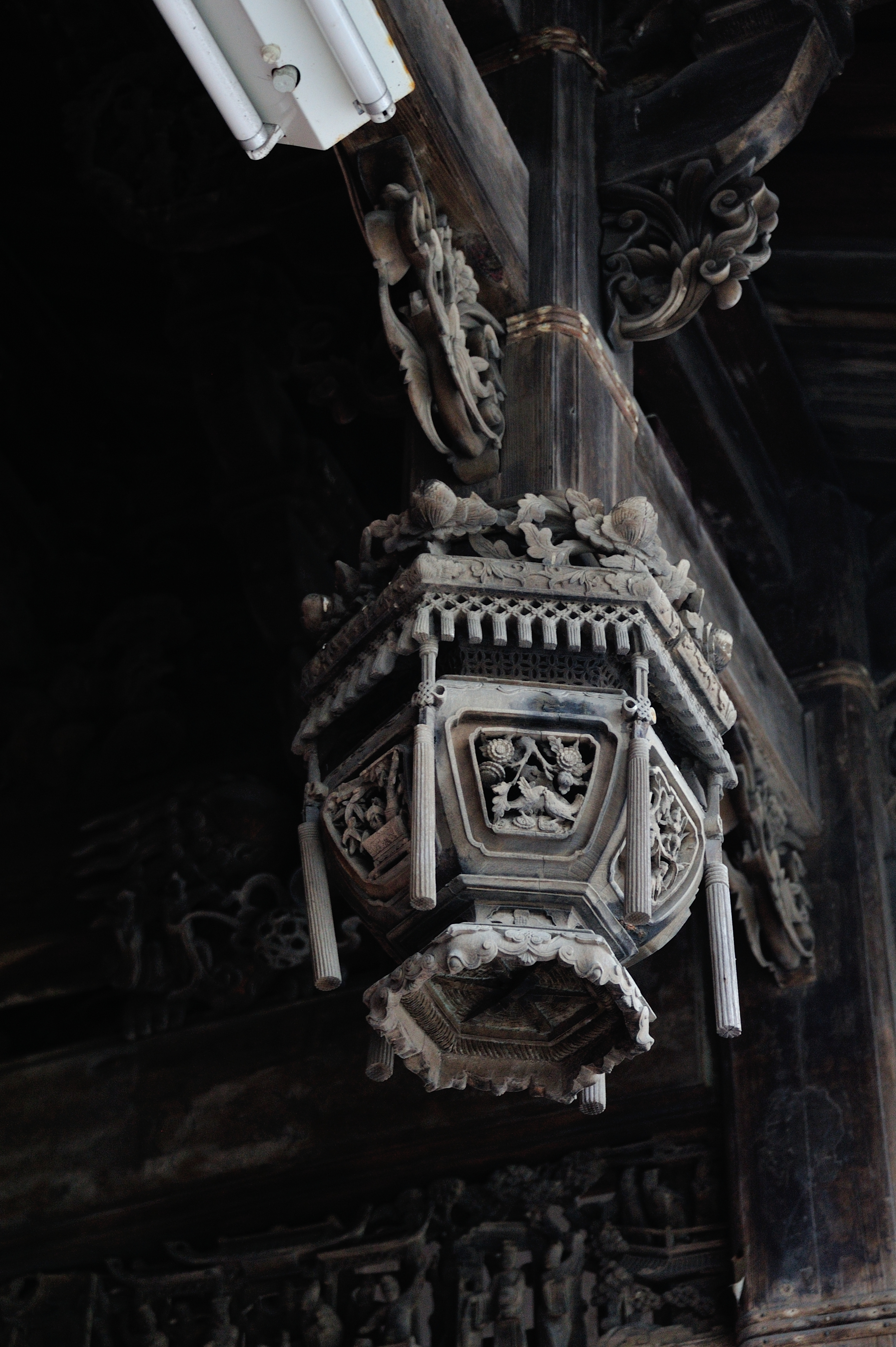
Ceiling decoration

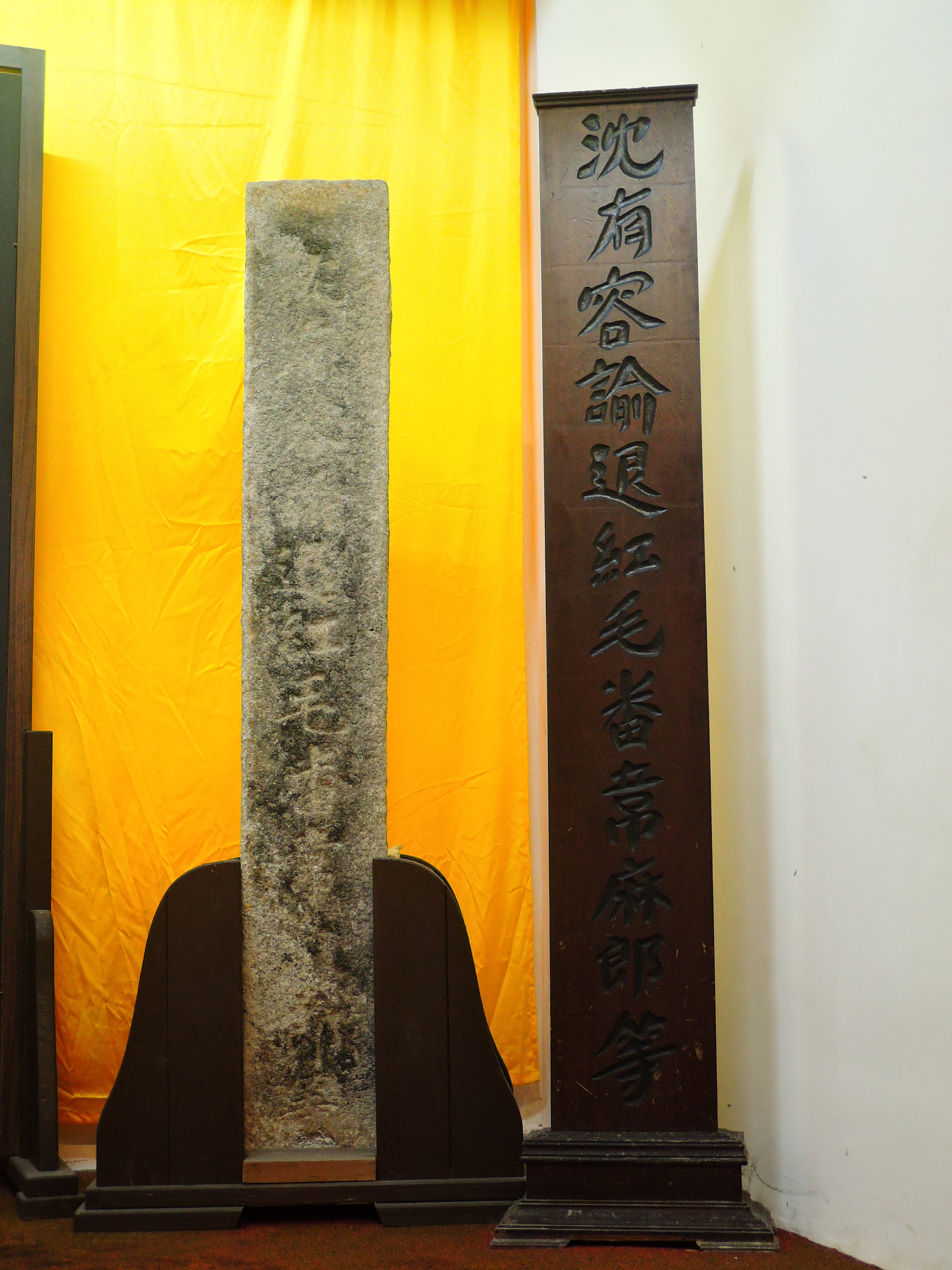
沈有容諭退紅毛番韋麻郎等 (1604) Shen Yourong expelled Dutch Wijbrant and his people

== See also ==
- Qianliyan & Shunfeng'er
- List of Mazu temples around the world
- List of temples in Taiwan
- Lan Mu
