= The Shaolin Warriors =

2008 Chinese TV series

- DVD cover art
- 少林僧兵
- Genre: Wuxia
- Written by: Wang Qiuyu; Li Zhixian
- Directed by: Raymond Lee
- Starring: Sammo Hung; Cui Lin; Jeanette Aw; Christopher Lee; Li Man; Sammy Hung; Cui Peng; Liu Ying
- Opening theme: "Shaolin Monastery" (少林寺) by Kung-Fu Pop
- Ending theme: "The Best Moments" (最好的时光) by Jeff Chang
- Country of origin: China
- Original language: Mandarin
- No. of episodes: 34

Production
- Executive producers: Shi Yongxin; Chen Juncong; Zhou Liming; Zhang Heyun; Li Hua
- Producers: Wang Maoliang; Shi Yongxin; Gao Xiaoping; Chen Lizhong
- Production location: Wuxi
- Running time: ≈45 minutes per episode
- Production companies: Shenzhen Media Group; Shaolin Temple Culture Broadcasting (Dengfeng); China Television Media; Beijing Yibo Film Production

Original release
- Network: CCTV-8
- Release: 3 November – 14 November 2008

The Shaolin Warriors (少林僧兵) is a Chinese wuxia television series directed by Raymond Lee, starring cast members from mainland China, Hong Kong, and Singapore. Set in 16th-century China during the Ming dynasty, the story is based on a legend of 30 Shaolin warrior monks who joined government forces in resisting the incursions by the wokou. First broadcast in November 2008 on CCTV-8 in mainland China, it is the first wuxia television series to filmed in direct collaboration with Shaolin Monastery and features some rarely seen martial arts.

== Synopsis ==
The series is set in 16th-century China during the Ming dynasty when the wokou constantly raid and pillage the coastal regions of eastern China. After his mother is killed by the wokou, Yuekong is saved by Big Feet Monk and taken to Shaolin Monastery, where he is trained in martial arts. During this time, he befriends Yuewen, a boy abandoned by his parents and sent to Shaolin to be a monk.

15 years later, while accompanying the Shaolin abbot to attend an event, Yuekong meets Hideko, a daimyo's daughter who develops a crush on him. Tensions rise between Yuekong and Fūgo, a samurai assigned to protect Hideko. Meanwhile, Yuewen encounters Li Ruolan, a woman who had lost his father during a wokou raid, and they have romantic feelings for each other.

The Shaolin abbot sends Yuekong and Yuewen to help the Ming general Qi Jiguang train his soldiers in martial arts and defend Ningbo from the wokou. At one point, Yuewen learns that his biological father is the pirate chief Wang Zhi, an ally of the wokou. Big Feet Monk is killed after Wang Zhi uses Yuewen to lure him into an ambush; Yuekong blames Yuewen for Big Feet Monk's death and swears vengeance. Later, it turns out that Yuewen has been making use of his relationship with Wang Zhi to infiltrate the wokou and gather intelligence for the Ming forces.

Yuekong risks his life to save Yuewen and reconciles with him. When the wokou, armed with European firearms, launch an attack, the Shaolin warrior monks brave the gunfire and fight the wokou. Yuekong and Fūgo duel in the midst of battle, with Yuekong emerging victorious in the end. Wang Zhi is ultimately captured by Hu Zongxian and dies in prison. Qi Jiguang is honoured for his success in driving back the wokou, while the heroics of the Shaolin warrior monks become legendary.

== Cast ==
- Sammo Hung as Big Feet Monk
- Sammy Hung as Yuekong
- Cui Lin as Yuewen
- Christopher Lee as Qi Jiguang
  - Hong Zhibin as Qi Jiguang (child)
- Jeanette Aw as Sun Haiqing
- Li Man as Hideko
- Cui Peng as Fūgo
- Liu Ying as Li Ruolan
  - Luo Jiaxu as Li Ruolan (child)
- Chen Zhihui as Yu Dayou
- Qin Yan as Abbot Xiaoshan
- Wang Jianxin as Wang Zhi
- Shen Baoping as Hu Zongxian
- Cai Gang as Yan Shifan
- Xu Seng as Jin Ke
- Fang Zhoubo as Wan Biao
- Ren Xihong as Sasaki
- Guo Changhui as Miyamoto
- Liu Weihua as Li Zhongcheng
- Dai Hekang as Mao Haifeng
- Hai Yan as Xiaolin'an
- Zhou Yunshen as Sun Haixiao
- Ding Xiaohu as Officer Liu
- He Xianwei as Wu Jingui
- Cao Shuai as Wang San
- Liu Kai as Yuejian
- Xue Jiangtao as Yueman
- Shi Ziliang as Ichimoto
- Zhou Jie as Zhou Zhiyuan
- Hao Han as Xiaofu
- Sun Lufei as Xiaofu's mother
- Meng Yansen as Xiaoshun
- Fan Libo as Xiaoshun's mother
- Zhao Gang as Qi Jingtong
- Shu Shouqin as Wang Zhi's father
- Zheng Rugao as a Wang clan elder
- Li Junliang as Qian Mazi
- Gao Jiafu as Tanaka
- Tao Jinlong as Toyotomi Hideyoshi
- Yuan Shichao as Officer Li
- Li Ke as Governor Zheng

== Production ==
The series had a costly budget. With Raymond Lee serving as the series' overall director, 120 monks and 200 secular students from Shaolin Monastery were involved in the production process.

The series was completed in late 2007 after more than three months of shooting in Wuxi's Film and TV Studios.

Shaolin Monastery's abbot, Shi Yongxin, expressed his desire to spread Shaolin history and culture to the rest of the world through this series.

== United States release ==
The series premiered in the United States with English subtitles on Toku from 12 July 2017 to 21 February 2018.

== International broadcast ==
Network(s)/Station(s)	Series premiere	Airing dates	Title
China	CCTV-8	January 11, 2015 - (November 3, 2008-November 14, 2008)	少林僧兵 ( The Shaolin Warriors; lit: )
Thailand	BBTV PSI (73)	July 11, 2018 – August 27, 2018 (Every Monday to Friday 08:45-09:30)	ศึกเส้าหลิน สองมังกร (The Shaolin Warriors; lit: )
Thailand	5HD1	11 September 2020 - 2 November 2020 (Tuesday October 13: No broadcasting), (Friday, October 23: no broadcasting), (Tuesday October 27: No broadcasting) (Every Monday to Friday 22:40-23:30)	ศึกเส้าหลิน สองมังกร (The Shaolin Warriors; lit: )
