= Cui Peng =

Cui Peng may refer to:

- Cui Peng (footballer) (born 1987), Chinese football player
- Cui Peng (actor), Chinese actor
- Cui Peng (politician), discipline inspector for the Central Commission for Discipline Inspection
