= Yu Zigao =

Chinese admiral

- Traditional Chinese: 俞諮皋
- Simplified Chinese: 俞谘皋
Transcriptions
Standard Mandarin
- Hanyu Pinyin: Yú Zīgāo
- Wade–Giles: Yü Tzu-kao

Yu Zigao (d. 1628) was a Chinese admiral. He was responsible for forcing the Dutch to leave Penghu Island. While he enriched himself by way of an association with one notorious pirate, Li Dan, his position came under pressure because of another pirate, Li Dan's protégé, Zheng Zhilong.

== Life ==
Zigao was the son of Yu Dayou, a notable pirate suppressor.

He took command of Zhejiang and Fujian's military forces as dūdū (都督) in February 1624 and immediately took a hard line against the Dutch East India Company stronghold on Penghu Island in the Pescadores. They had previously agreed to withdraw to Taiwan but had continued to delay the move. Yu commissioned several iron "red-barbarian cannon", one of the first Chinese officials to do so. He assembled his provincial forces and forced the Dutch to dismantle their fortifications in August the same year. They then removed themselves to Taiwan, where they established Fort Zeelandia. Following the recovery of the Pescadores, Yu had its Mazu temple refurbished and enlarged.

Yu Zigao was on friendly terms with the merchant and pirate Li Dan and used his position to enrich himself.

In 1627 and 1628, Li Dan's protégé Zheng Zhilong launched a series of massive pirate invasions of the Fujianese coast, maintaining his popularity by targeting the wealthy and reserving some of the plunder for assistance to the poor. He sank hundreds of Ming vessels and captured several county seats around Quanzhou and Zhangzhou. In 1628, he successfully attacked Xiamen ("Amoy"), the base of Yu Zigao's anti-piracy forces, and forced Yu to flee. By capturing and executing pirates affiliated with Yu and offering to submit to Ming control, he was able to legitimize himself at Yu's expense. (Yu himself had difficulty at the imperial court owing to his association with the eunuch faction under Wei Zhongxian.)

== Legacy ==
The 1624 stele recording Yu Zigao's ultimatum to the Dutch to abandon Taiwan was discovered at Magong's Mazu Temple in 1919 and is preserved by the temple.

== See also ==
- Sino-Dutch conflicts
- Zheng dynasty
