= Fengguiwei Fort =

Historical site in Magong, Penghu, Taiwan

- 風櫃尾城堡 (Chinese)
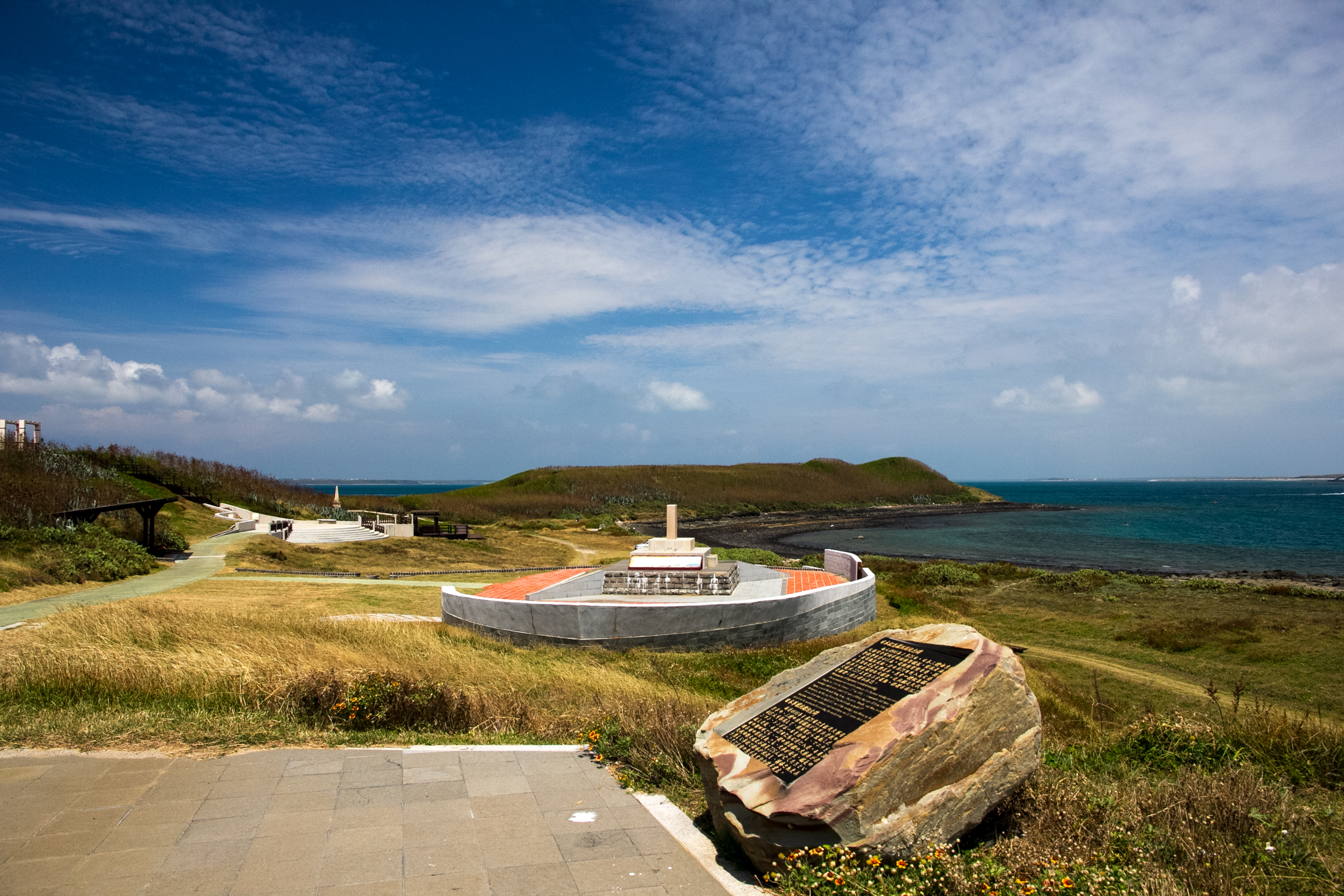
- Interactive map of Fengguiwei Fort
- 23.553°N 119.548°E
- Type: Fortification
- Location: Magong, Penghu, Taiwan

History
- Built: 1622; 404 years ago
- Demolished: 1624; 402 years ago

Fengguiwei Fort (Chinese: 風櫃尾城堡; pinyin: Fēngguìwěi Chéngbǎo; Pe̍h-ōe-jī: Hong-kūi-bóe Siâⁿ-pó) is a former Dutch fortification located in Magong, Penghu, Taiwan. The fort sat atop a small hill on a peninsula across the bay from Magong Harbor. As of today, little of the original structure remains.

== Structure ==
The fort was built of compacted soil in a square with a side length of 55 m and a height of 7 m. On the southwest side facing the rest of the peninsula, the walls were covered with rock, and a trench was dug as well; the other three walls were covered with wood. Bastions were built on all four corners.

== History ==
In 1622, the Dutch, based in Batavia, were seeking to establish a stronger presence in East Asia. A fleet of six ships led by Cornelis Reijersen attempted to capture Macau to disrupt the Portuguese's profitable Macau-Nagasaki route. However, despite outnumbering the defenders, Reijersen's fleet was defeated and repelled. Frustrated, they turned to the Pescadores (modern day Penghu) to set up a base and coerce the Chinese into trading with them.

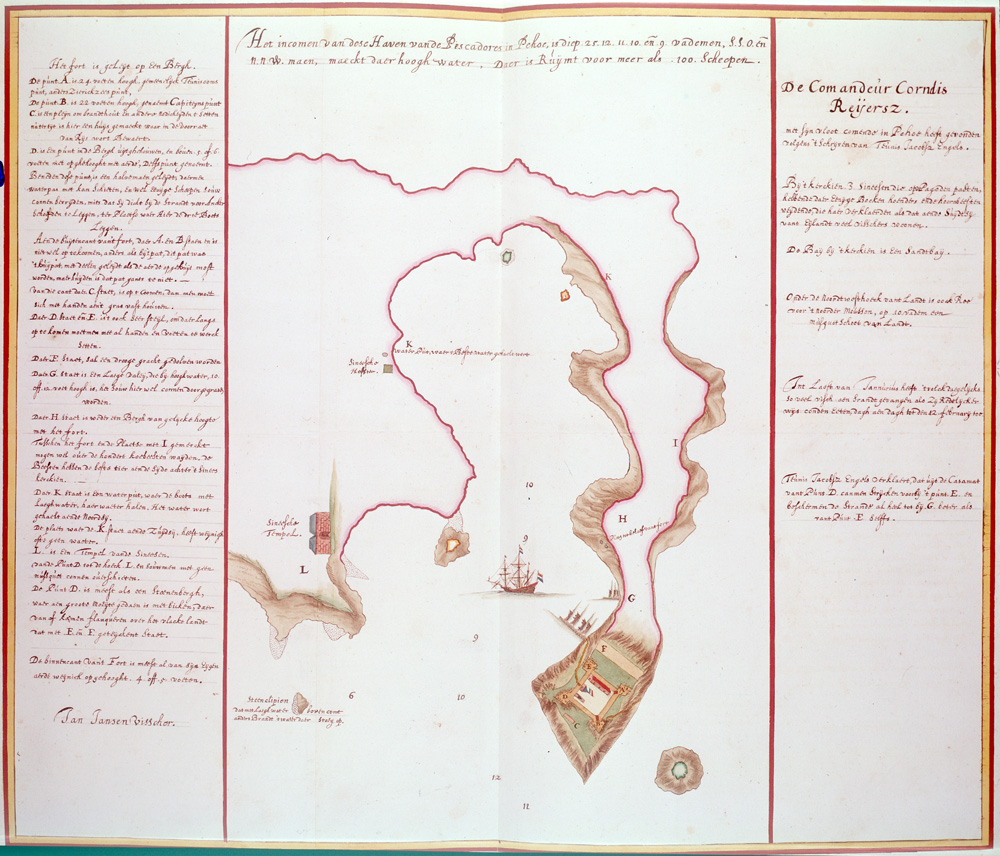
Duch fort at Pescadores from 1622 to 1624

Reijersen built his fort atop a hill known as Shetou Mountain (蛇頭山), forcing 1,500 locals into its construction. Allegedly, 1,300 of the workmen died due to starvation. From there, the Dutch began raiding Chinese trading ships in an attempt to "induce the Chinese to trade by force or from fear." Their stay in the Pescadores, however, was short lived, ending in a successful Chinese offensive on the fort in August 1624. The Dutch and Chinese reached an agreement to destroy the fort, and the Dutch would move to Formosa (modern day Taiwan), where they built Fort Zeelandia, remaining there for 38 years.

According to the French Jesuit Joseph-Anne-Marie de Moyriac de Mailla in 1715 there were no remains of the fort, only the description of it, which the Chinese called the "castle of red hair"

In 1895, Japanese Admiral Itō Sukeyuki rearmed the site as an artillery battery as part of the Japanese invasion of Taiwan. These cannons were removed in 1945 with the surrender of Japan.

== See also ==
- Dutch Formosa
