= Lan Mu =

Taiwanese architect and woodcarver (1872–1943)

- Born: 1872; Dabu, Chaozhou, Guangdong, Qing China
- Died: 1943 (aged 70–71); Magong, Penghu, Taiwan, Empire of Japan
- Occupations: Craftsman, Architect, Printer
- Known for: Taiwan Traditional Temple Architecture
- Relatives: Lan He (Younger brother)

Chinese name
- Traditional Chinese: 藍木
- Simplified Chinese: 蓝木
Transcriptions
Standard Mandarin
- Hanyu Pinyin: Lán Mù
Southern Min
- Hokkien POJ: Nâ Bo̍k

Lan Mu (1872–1943; Chinese: 藍木; pinyin: Lán Mù; Pe̍h-ōe-jī: Nâ Bo̍k) was from Dabu, Chaozhou of Guangdong Province. He was a famous craftsman of traditional architecture in Taiwan and Penghu during 1916 to 1943. According to the area of his hometown, he might be a Hakka.

== Biography ==
Lan Mu's parents died in his early years and he went to be a craftsman's apprentice to raise himself and his younger brother Lan He (藍合). Based on his hard work and talent, he became a wood carving master in Chaozhou.

In 1916 (Taishō 5th year), Lan Mu left his hometown and moved to Penghu with his brother. In 1923, (Taishō 11th year), Lan Mu was assigned to be the chief architect of the Penghu Mazu Temple restoration. At the time, he was 40 years old (as the East Asian age reckoning). Three years later, Lan Mu and other craftsmen successfully finished the repair.

Penghu Mazu Temple was the most important work in Lan Mu's career. In addition to Mazu Temple, Lan Mu took part in other repair works, such as Beiji Temple and Beichen Temple, both located at Magong City. Beiji Temple was destroyed by the United States Army Air Forces during World War II and Beichen Temple was dismantled and rebuilt in 1981.

Lan Mu also had a printing factory in Penghu. His descendants took it over until the present.

== Gallery ==
Lee Chien-lang (李乾朗), a Taiwanese traditional architecture investigator, speaks very highly of Lan Mu's works. Moreover, because Lan Mu was from Guangdong, he was different from most of craftsmen in Taiwan main island who were from Fujian. His shape pattern and the decorations had a unique style; he preferred square pillars, and the carving work he did was much finer.

Penghu Mazu Temple

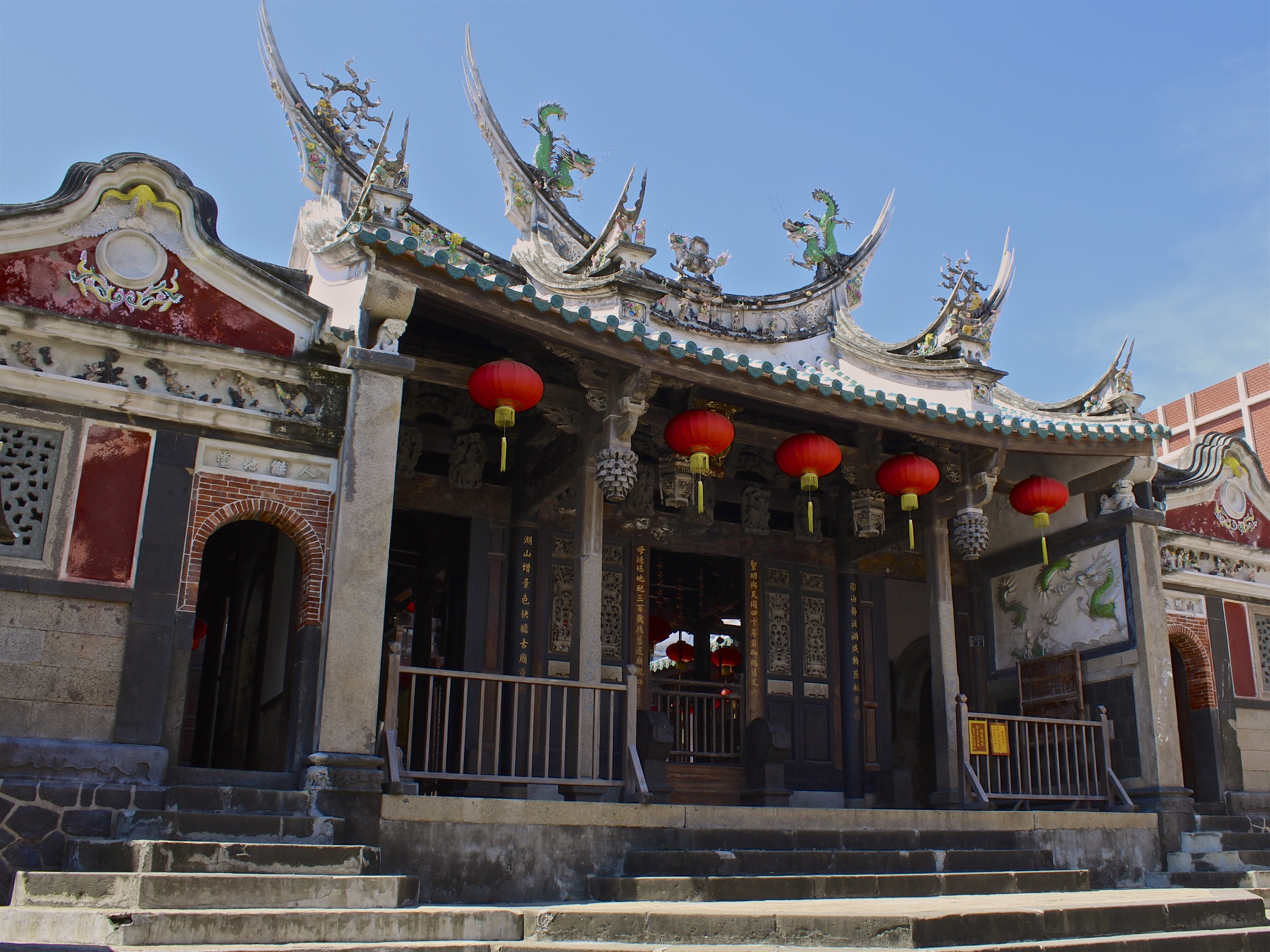

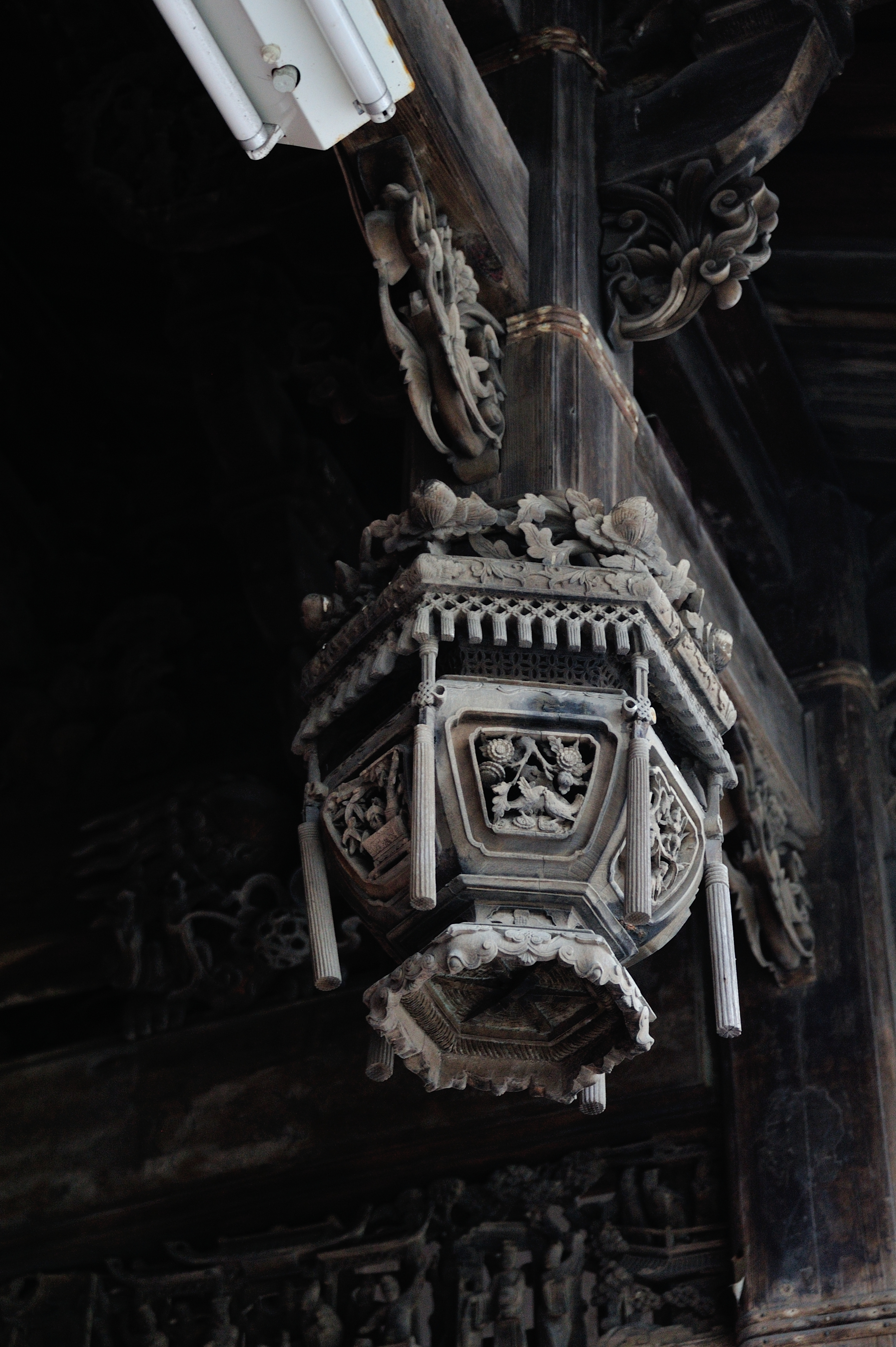

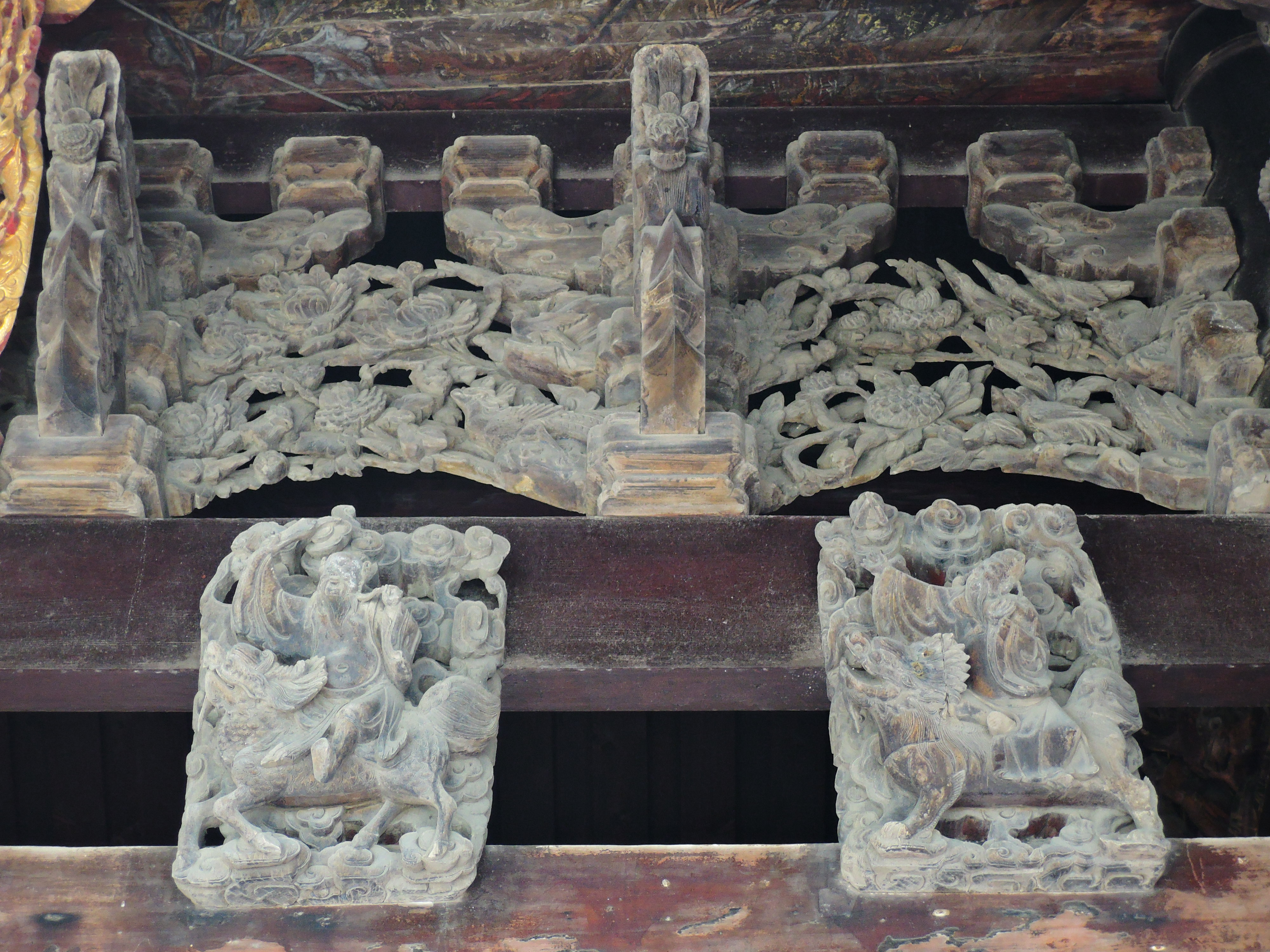

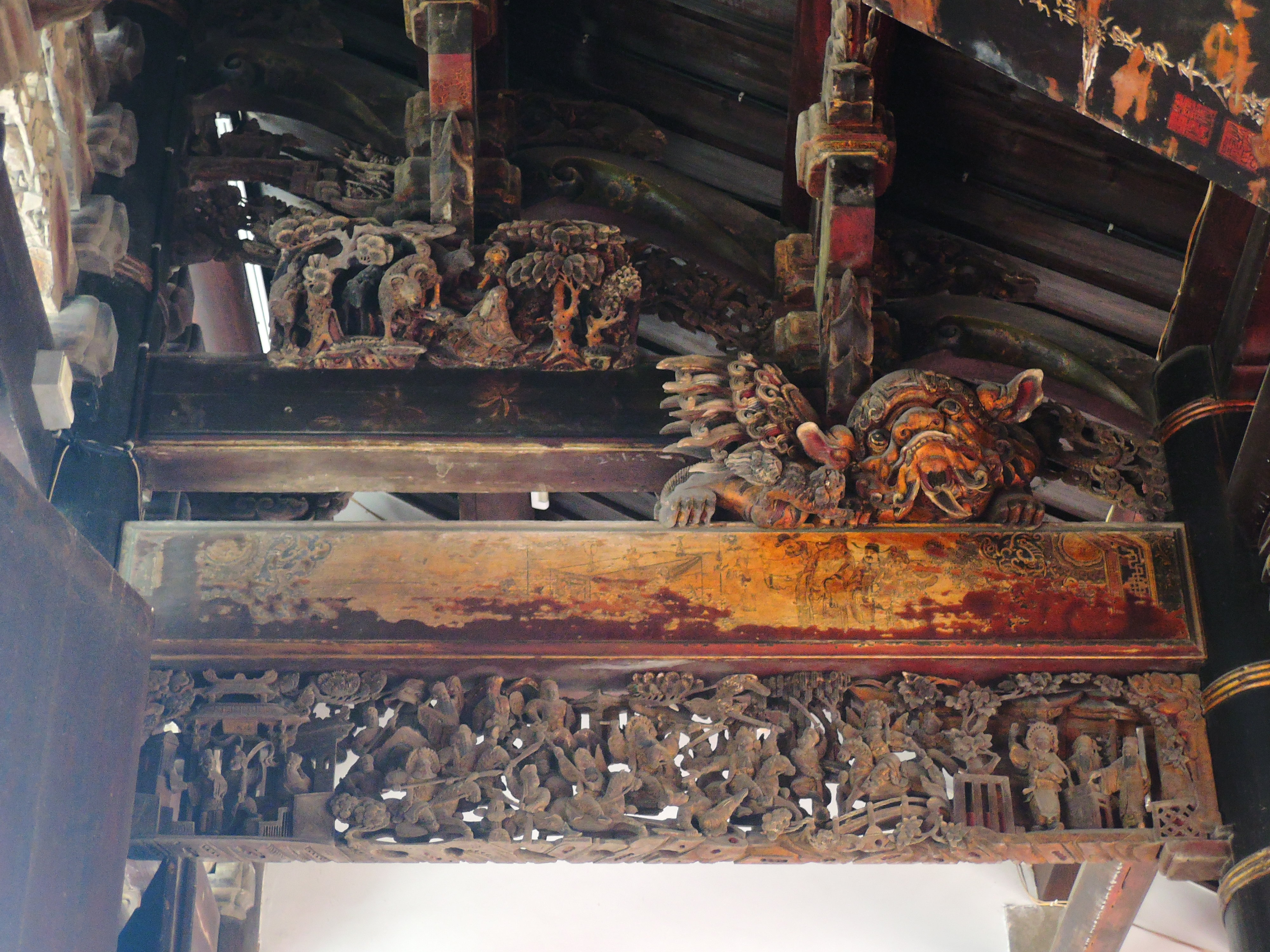

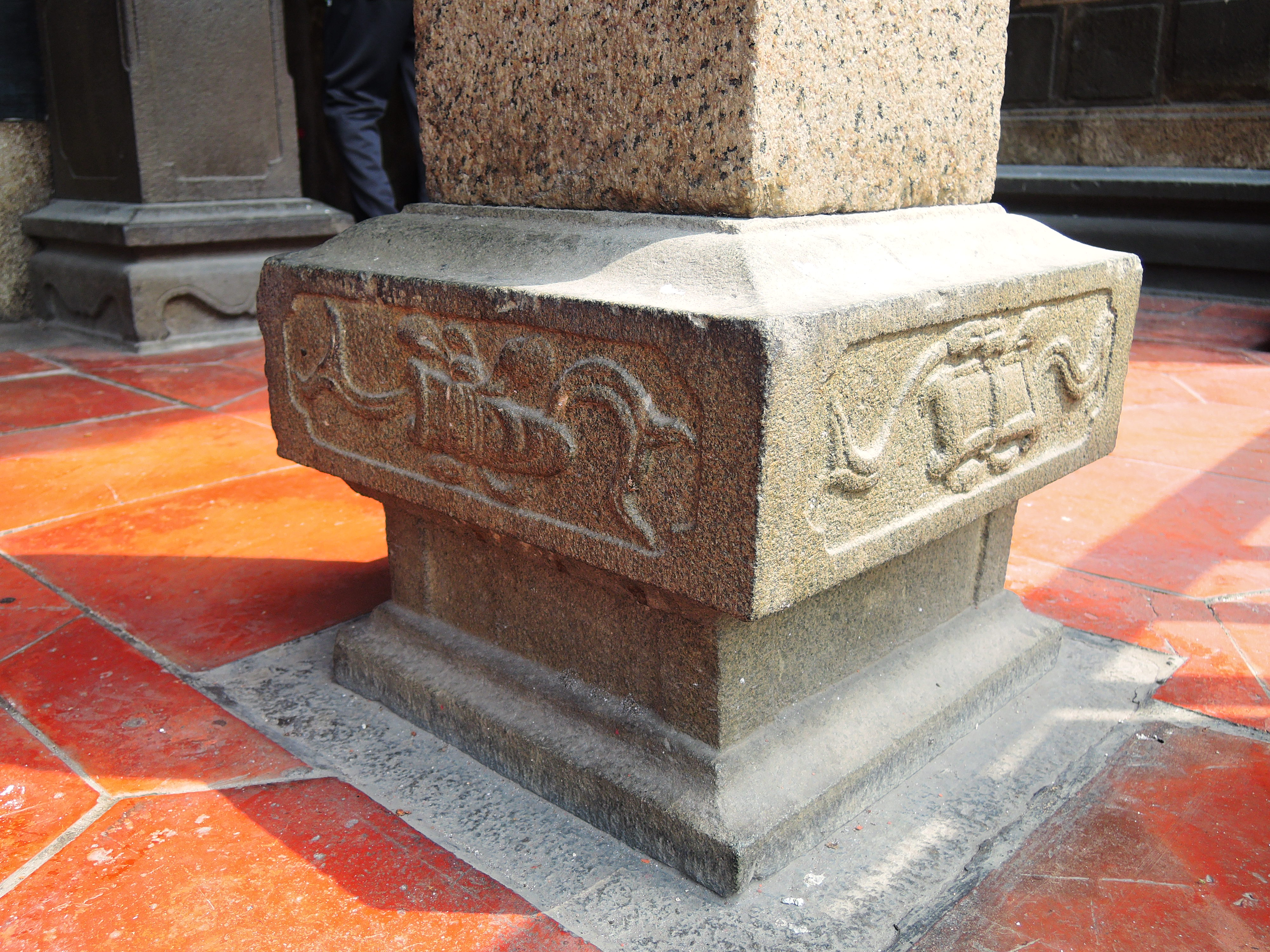
