= The Dragon Heroes =

2005 Chinese TV series

- DVD cover art
- 赤子乘龙
- Genre: Fantasy; Costume drama
- Screenplay by: Zhang Tianyi; Cheng Jieyin; Shuai Xuefang
- Directed by: Steve Cheng; Li Hantao; Mo Yan; Xie Yiwen
- Creative director: Lin Zechi
- Starring: Ren Quan; Li Xiaolu; Christopher Lee; Cui Peng; Eddy Ko; Felix Wong; Bryan Leung; Florence Tan; Tien Niu; Chen Tianwen; Ding Yujia
- Opening theme: "Heaven Turns, Earth Rotates" (天旋地转) by Michelle Liow
- Ending theme: "Predestined" (注定) by Cui Peng and Michelle Liow
- Country of origin: China
- Original language: Mandarin
- No. of episodes: 40

Production
- Producers: Ma Jiajun; Liu Tianfu
- Production location: China
- Cinematography: Lin Guohua; Guo Jinhua; Gao Dajun
- Running time: 45 minutes per episode
- Production companies: Shanghai Film Group; Shanghai SFS Digital Media; Mediacorp

Original release
- Network: BTV
- Release: 18 April – 10 June 2005

The Dragon Heroes (赤子乘龙) is a Chinese epic fantasy television series starring Ren Quan, Li Xiaolu, Christopher Lee, Cui Peng, Eddy Ko, Felix Wong, Bryan Leung, Florence Tan, Tien Niu, Chen Tianwen and Ding Yujia. The series was first broadcast in 2005 on BTV in mainland China and on MediaCorp Channel 8 in Singapore.

== Synopsis ==
The series is set in a mythical Chinese world populated by humans, dragons and demons. In the past, the dragons had saved the humans by helping them defeat the demons. However, the human Emperor feared that the dragons posed a threat to him so he turned against the dragons and imprisoned the Dragon King in ice.

Yuanbao, a young orphan, was raised by Wang Jili, a street performer. He lives with Wang Jili and his daughter, Wang Mingzhu, and gets along well only with Feicui, an ugly but kind fellow orphan. One day, Yuanbao accidentally frees the dragon princess, Shuilinglong, who had been trapped in an enchanted ball. Shuilinglong feels grateful towards Yuanbao so she possesses Feicui, who has fallen into a coma after an injury, and takes over Feicui's identity and changes Feicui's appearance to that of a beautiful woman.

Li Bin, the human crown prince, is good-natured and benevolent unlike his father, the ruthless Emperor, and he often ventures out of the palace to interact with commoners. He is close friends with Yan Cheng, who is engaged to Wang Mingzhu but actually loves Feicui. After Shuilinglong takes over Feicui's identity, she falls in love with Li Bin. Yan Cheng does not know that she is not really Feicui so he feels very sad upon seeing that "Feicui" apparently loves Li Bin now. Li Bin reciprocates Shuilinglong's feelings towards him, but feels somewhat guilty for stealing "Feicui" from Yan Cheng.

While searching for her father, Shuilinglong encounters and reunites with her fellow dragons, including her childhood playmate Xiaobailong, who has disguised himself as a human called Yao Lie. Yao Lie works for the First Princess, the Emperor's sister, and secretly plans to save the Dragon King and avenge the humiliation suffered by the dragons. Wang Mingzhu and Yao Lie also start a romance after they meet each other.

With Shuilinglong's help, Yuanbao discovers that he is not really an orphan: his mother is actually the First Princess and his father was executed by the Emperor for his close relationship with the Dragon King. Yuanbao, who was then still very young, was saved by an immortal when the Emperor tried to kill him, and was subsequently adopted by Wang Jili. The First Princess has been secretly holding a grudge against the Emperor for her husband's death and her son's disappearance, so she has been plotting to kill Li Bin and the Emperor. However, she gives up her desire for vengeance after she reunites with her long-lost son.

Shuilinglong and Xiaobailong train hard to increase their powers and eventually manage to rescue the Dragon King. The conflict between humans and dragons seemingly comes to an end when both sides grudgingly agree to a marriage between Shuilinglong and Li Bin upon seeing how much they love each other. However, in a twist of events, the Emperor breaks the truce and kills the Dragon King, and later gets killed by Yao Lie in turn. Yao Lie, in his quest for greater power, becomes evil and tries to force Shuilinglong to marry him. Shuilinglong, Yan Cheng, Li Bin and the others join forces to find an icy arrow to counter Yao Lie and defeat him. Yao Lie realises his misdeeds and repents.

In the end, Shuilinglong sees that Yan Cheng truly loves Feicui so she leaves Feicui's body and uses her powers to revive the real Feicui. Her spirit continues to wander around freely. Li Bin gives up his royal status and leaves to join Shuilinglong. Yao Lie leaves with Wang Mingzhu to lead a peaceful life. Yuanbao becomes the new emperor and promises to be a good ruler.

== Cast ==
- Li Xiaolu as Shuilinglong / Feicui
- Christopher Lee as Yan Cheng
- Ren Quan as Li Bin
- Florence Tan as Wang Mingzhu
- Cui Peng as Xiaobailong / Yao Lie
- Ding Yujia as Yuanbao
- Tien Niu as the First Princess
- Chen Tianwen as Xiang Hai
- Bryan Leung as Wang Jili
- Eddy Ko as the Emperor
- Felix Wong as the Dragon King
- Hu Wensui as Hua Munan
- Li Jianxun as Zhu Yingcai
- Wang Yanbin as the One Horned Dragon
- Wong Yat-fei as the Big Dipper
- Yvonne Lim as Princess Yin Qiao
