= Yu Dayou =

Chinese general (1503–1579)

- 俞大猷
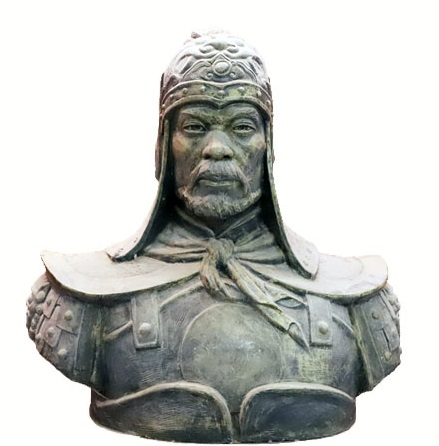
- Born: 1503; Heshi, Fujian
- Died: 1579 (aged 75–76)
- Other names: Zhifu (志輔); Xujiang (虛江); Wuxiang (武襄)
- Occupations: Martial artist, military general, writer
- Children: Yu Zigao

Yu Dayou
- Traditional Chinese: 俞大猷
Transcriptions
Southern Min
- Hokkien POJ: Jû Tāi-iû
- Tâi-lô: Jû Tāi-iû

(art name)Zhifu
- Traditional Chinese: 志輔
Transcriptions
Southern Min
- Hokkien POJ: Chì-hú
- Tâi-lô: Tsì-hú

Yu Dayou (1503–1579), courtesy name Zhifu, art name Xujiang, was a Chinese martial artist, military general, and writer best known for countering the wokou pirates along China's southeastern coast during the reign of the Jiajing Emperor in the Ming dynasty.

== Life ==
Yu Dayou was born in present-day Heshi Village, Fujian, but his ancestral home was in present-day Huoqiu County, Lu'an, Anhui. He sat for the military version of the imperial examination in 1535 and obtained the position of a wujinshi (Chinese: 武進士; Pe̍h-ōe-jī: Bú Chìn-sū; lit. 'successful candidate'). He was awarded the title of a qianhu (Chinese: 千戶; Pe̍h-ōe-jī: Chhian-hō͘; lit. 'lord over 1', '000 households' ) and appointed as a guard in Jinmen Island, Fujian.

In 1555, Yu Dayou, along with the Zhuang noblewoman, Wa Shi, led Ming forces to attack the wokou pirates who were raiding near Jiaxing, Zhejiang and defeated about 2,000 of them. In the following year, he was promoted to garrison commander (Chinese: 總兵; Pe̍h-ōe-jī: Chóng-peng) of Zhejiang and was ordered to eliminate the wokou threat. He led Ming forces to attack the wokou base in Zhoushan in northeastern Zhejiang. In 1562, Yu Dayou was reassigned to serve as the garrison commander of Fujian. In the following year, he joined Qi Jiguang and other Ming generals in attacking the wokou at Putian and successfully seized back the city from the enemy. By 1566, most of the wokou who had terrorised China's southeastern coast had been largely driven away.

Yu Dayou was known for being an honest and upright official. When he met representatives from the influential spy agency, Eastern Depot, he refused to provide bribes to them and ended up being framed on false charges and imprisoned. Although he was saved by Qi Jiguang and Hu Zongxian, he nonetheless felt disappointed with political corruption within the Ming government and died in frustration. He was posthumously honoured as "Left Chief Controller" (Chinese: 左都督; Pe̍h-ōe-jī: Chó To͘-tok) and given the posthumous name "Wuxiang" (Chinese: 武襄; Pe̍h-ōe-jī: Bú-siong).

His son Yu Zigao served as military governor of Fujian. He successfully forced the Dutch to withdraw from Penghu Island to Taiwan in 1624, but was subjected to a series of massive raids in 1627 and 1628 by Zheng Zhilong, culminating in the sack of his base at Xiamen.

== Legacy ==
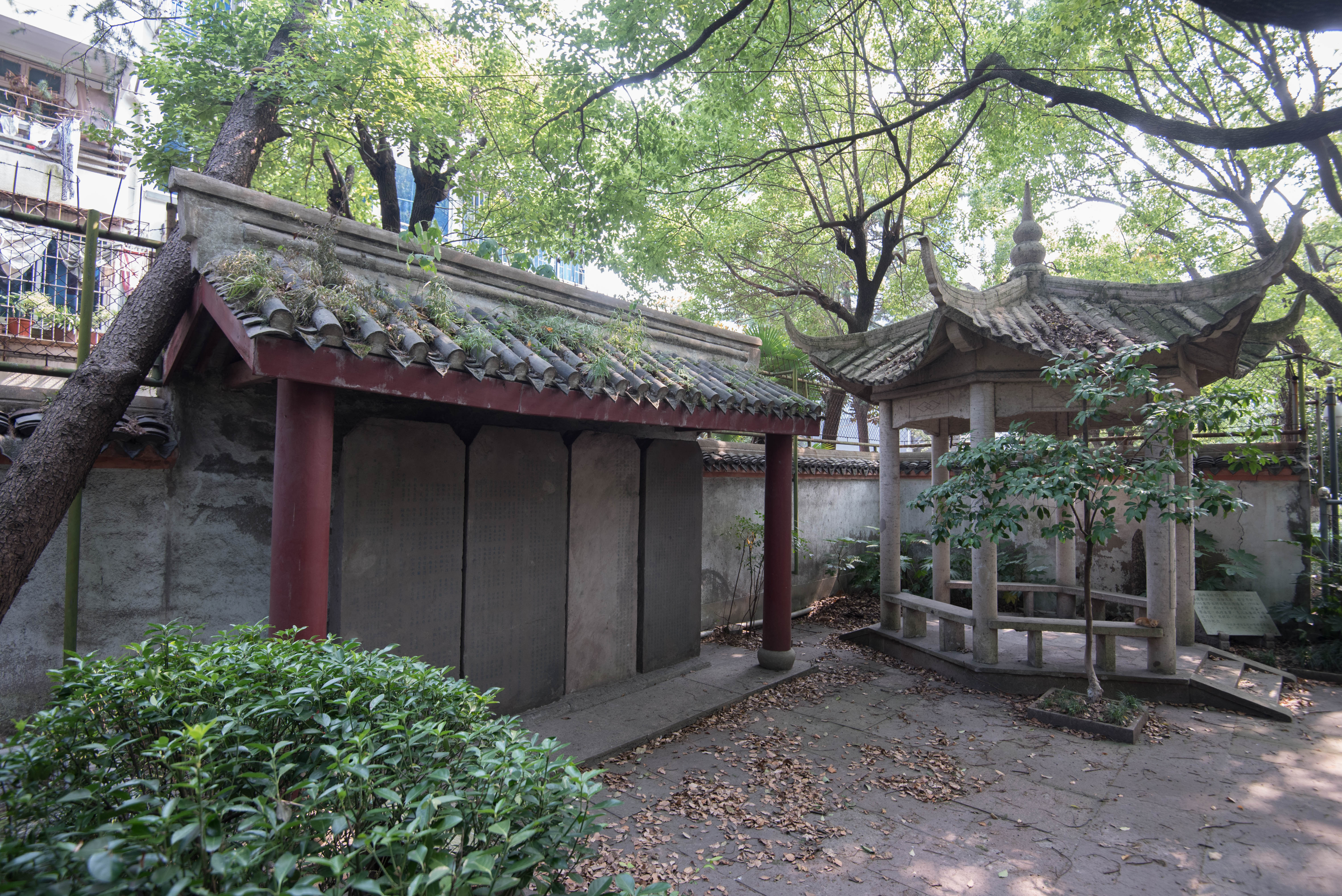
Steles originally erected in 1559 in commemoration of Yu Dayou, now in the grounds of Zhenhai Middle School, Zhenhai, Zhejiang

Dayou Street (Chinese: 大猷街; Pe̍h-ōe-jī: Tāi-iû-koe) in Liandu District, Lishui, Zhejiang is named after Yu Dayou to celebrate his achievements in defeating the wokou. Yu Dayou's tomb in Luojiang District, Quanzhou, Fujian has also been designated by the Fujian provincial government as a Historical and Cultural Site Protected at the Provincial Level.

=== Martial arts ===
Yu Dayou was also a martial artist who specialised in a style of weapon fighting called "Jingchu Changjian" (Chinese: 荊楚長劍; Pe̍h-ōe-jī: Keng-chhó͘ Tiông-kiàm; "Jing and Chu Long Sword"). He studied martial arts in Shaolin Monastery, and later wrote and compiled Zhengqi Tang Ji (Chinese: 正氣堂集; Pe̍h-ōe-jī: Chèng-khì Tông-chi̍p; "Compilation of Vital Energy").

In his book, there is a section called Jian Jing (Chinese: 劍經; Pe̍h-ōe-jī: Kiàm-keng; "Sword Classic" or "Sword Treatise"), which later became a martial arts manual by itself.

Around 1560, Yu Dayou travelled to Shaolin Monastery to observe the Shaolin monks' fighting techniques. As a result, he returned to the south along with two monks, Zongqing and Pucong. Over the next three years, he taught them the "Yu Family Staff" (Chinese: 俞家棍; Pe̍h-ōe-jī: Jû-ka-kùn), a set of staff movement techniques he created based on the "Jingchu Changjian" and "Yang Family Spear" (Chinese: 楊家槍; Pe̍h-ōe-jī: Iûⁿ Ka-chhiuⁿ). Zongqing and Pucong later returned to Shaolin Monastery and taught other monks what they had learned. Tang Hao, a 20th-century martial arts expert, traced the Shaolin staff style Wu Hu Lan (Chinese: 五虎攔; Pe̍h-ōe-jī: Gō͘-hó͘-lân; lit. 'Five Tigers Interception') to Yu Dayou's teachings.
