= Yuekong =

Yuekong (月空) was reportedly a Buddhist monk at the Shaolin Monastery in China at the time of the Jiajing Emperor in the 16th century. The Shaolin monks were known for their fighting skills, and Yuekong is said to have been a leader in an incident involving pirates near Shanghai. Armed with iron staves, he and about thirty other monks attacked the pirates, and were said to have killed a large number before they themselves were all slain.
