= Cui Peng (actor) =

- Born: 3 October 1982 (age 43); Jinan, Shandong, China
- Occupation: Actor
- Years active: 2002–present
- Awards: Star Search 2003: Male Champion

Chinese name
Transcriptions
Standard Mandarin
- Hanyu Pinyin: Cuī Péng
Yue: Cantonese
- Jyutping: Ceoi1 Paang4
- Musical career
- Also known as: Kelvin Cui

Cui Peng (born 3 October 1982), also known as Kelvin Cui, is a Chinese actor. After graduating from the Beijing Film Academy in 2000, he participated in the Singaporean talent show Star Search in 2003 and emerged as the Overall Male Champion and Overall Best Potential Host. He then signed a contract with Singapore's MediaCorp Channel 8 and acted in some of MediaCorp's productions but left the network later.

== Filmography ==
=== Films ===
Year	Title	Role
2009	Roses' Fragrance 玫瑰余香	Tan Ke

=== Television series ===
Year	Title	Role
2004	The Magic Touch of Fate 魔术奇缘	Xu Junhao
2004	The Dragon Heroes 赤子乘龙	Xiaobailong / Yao Lie
2004	Silver Years 银色年华	Wu Si
2005	The Great Adventure 大冒险家	Lee Tik
2005	Love Concierge 爱的掌门人	Lin Weilun
2006	The Red Boy 红孩儿	Third Dragon Prince
2007	The Legend of Chu Liuxiang 楚留香传奇	Wuhua
2007	Meiwei Tonghua 美味童话	Ding Zhen
2007	The Fairies of Liaozhai 聊斋奇女子	Qiaolangjun
2008	The Shaolin Warriors 少林僧兵	Fengyu
2008	Teshu Zhengduo 特殊争夺	Ma Guoxun
2008	Beach.Ball.Babes 球爱大战	Yan Feipeng
2009	Xiangxi Diexue Ji 湘西喋血记	Wang Jingshan
2011	Shei Shi Baba 谁是爸爸	Chen Zhe
2011	The Duet 四手妙弹	Mo Wen
2012	The Story of Liu Hai and Jinchan 刘海戏金蟾	Wu Gang
2012	Earth God and Earth Grandmother 土地公土地婆	Liu He
2013	A Happy Life 天天有喜	Yuesong
2014	Sister Gan Nineteen 新甘十九妹	Yin Jianping
2016	Novoland: The Castle in the Sky 九州·天空城	Xing Yinchi
2018	Battle Through the Heavens 斗破苍穹	Gu He
2019	Legend of the Phoenix 凤弈	Pang Tong
2019	Love and Destiny 宸汐缘	Mo Huan
2019	Joy of Life 庆余年	Gong Dian
