= Sino-Dutch conflicts =

Conflicts between the Dutch and China

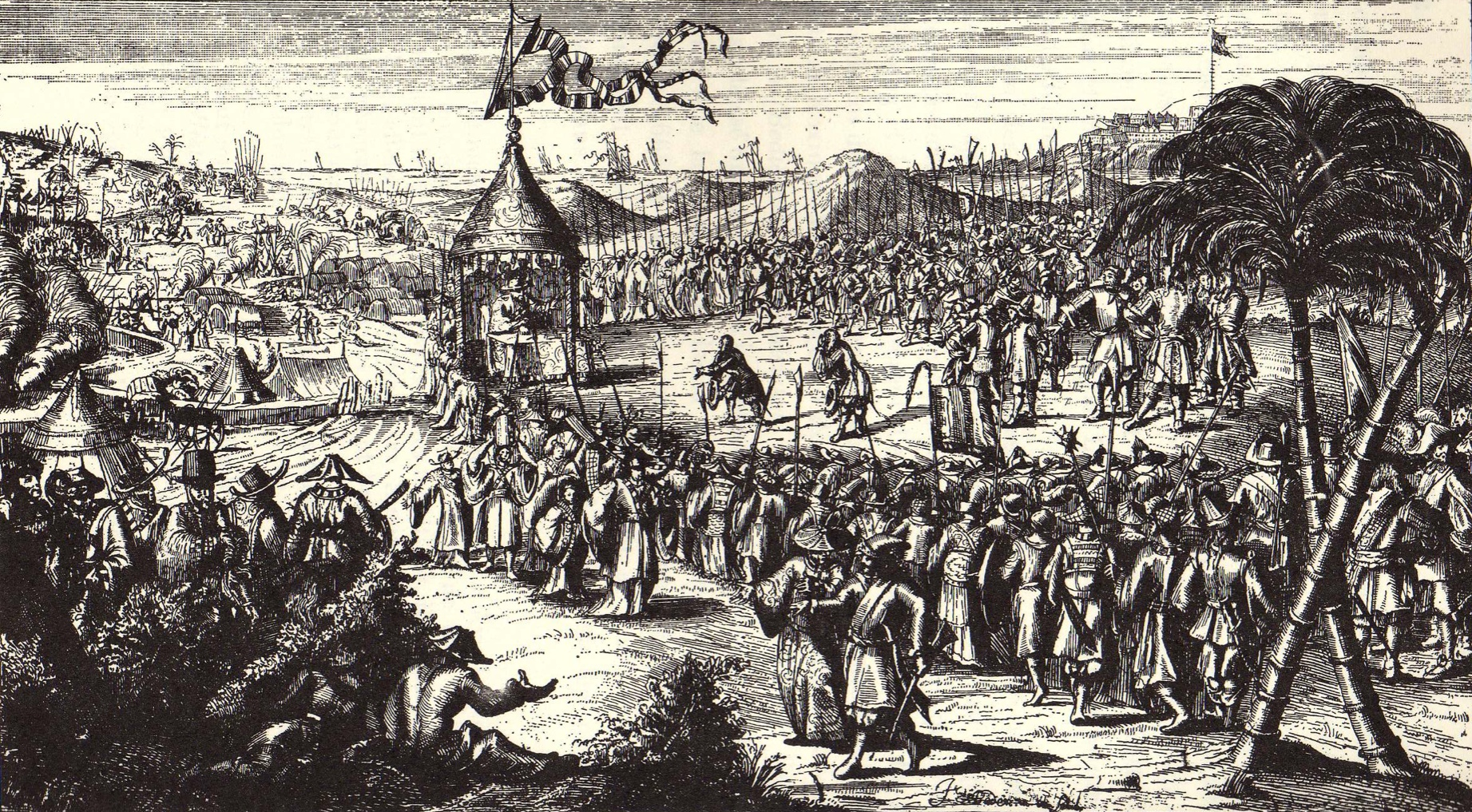
- A Dutch illustration of the surrender of Zeelandia on Formosa to China in 1662
Date	1620s–1670s
Location	Fujian, Amoy, Penghu, Liaoluo Bay, Kinmen, Tainan, Taiwan
Result	Ming victory

Belligerents
Ming dynasty Ming loyalists	Dutch East India Company; Chinese pirates

Commanders and leaders
Shang Zhouzuo (Shang Chou-tso); Nan Juyi (Nan Chü-i); General Wang Mengxiong; Zheng Zhilong; Zheng Chenggong (Koxinga); Zheng Jing	Cornelis Reijersen; Christian Francs (POW); Marten Sonck; Hans Putmans; Frederick Coyett; Liu Xiang; Li Guozhu

The Sino-Dutch conflicts were a series of conflicts between the Ming dynasty (and later its rump successor the Southern Ming dynasty and the Ming loyalist Kingdom of Tungning) of China and the Dutch East India Company over trade and land throughout the 1620s, 1630s, and 1662. The Dutch were attempting to compel China to accede to their trade demands, but the Chinese defeated the Dutch forces.

== Sino-Dutch conflicts ==
=== 1620s ===
The Dutch East India Company used their military power in the attempt to force China to open up a port in Fujian to their trade. They demanded that China expel the Portuguese from Macau. (The Dutch were fighting in the Dutch–Portuguese War at the time.) The Dutch raided Chinese shipping after 1618 and took junks hostage to coerce China into meeting their demands. All these actions were unsuccessful.

The Dutch were defeated by the Portuguese at the Battle of Macau in 1622. That same year, the Dutch seized Penghu (the Pescadores Islands), built a fort there, and continued to demand that China open up ports in Fujian to Dutch trade. China refused, with the Chinese governor of Fujian (Fukien) Shang Zhouzuo (Shang Chou-tso) demanding that the Dutch withdraw from the Pescadores to Formosa (Taiwan), where the Chinese would permit them to engage in trade. This led to a war between the Dutch and China between 1622 and 1624 which ended with the Chinese being successful in making the Dutch withdraw to Taiwan and abandoning the Pescadores.

The Dutch threatened that China would face Dutch raids on Chinese ports and shipping unless the Chinese allowed trading on Penghu and that China not trade with Manila but only with the Dutch in Batavia and Siam and Cambodia. However, the Dutch found out that unlike smaller Asian kingdoms, China could not be bullied or intimidated by them. After Shang ordered them to withdraw to Taiwan on September 19 of 1622, the Dutch raided Amoy on October and November. The Dutch intended to "induce the Chinese to trade by force or from fear" by raiding Fujian and Chinese shipping from the Pescadores. Long artillery batteries were erected at Amoy in March 1622 by Colonel Li Gonghua as a defence against the Dutch.

On the Dutch attempt in 1623 to force China to open up a port, five Dutch ships were sent to Liu-ao and the mission ended in failure for the Dutch, with a number of Dutch sailors taken prisoner and one of their ships lost. In response to the Dutch using captured Chinese for forced labor and strengthening their garrison in Penghu with five more ships in addition to the six already there, the new governor of Fujian, Nan Juyi (Nan Chü-yi), was permitted by China to begin preparations to attack the Dutch forces in July 1623. A Dutch raid was defeated by the Chinese at Amoy in October 1623, with the Chinese taking the Dutch commander Christian Francs prisoner and burning one of the four Dutch ships. Yu Zigao began an offensive in February 1624 with warships and troops against the Dutch in Penghu with the intent of expelling them.

The Chinese offensive reached the Dutch fort on July 30, 1624, with 5,000 Chinese troops (or 10,000) and 40-50 warships under Yu and General Wang Mengxiong surrounding the fort commanded by Marten Sonck, and the Dutch were forced to sue for peace on August 3, withdrawing from Penghu to Taiwan. The Dutch admitted that their attempt at military force to coerce China into trading with them had failed with their defeat in Penghu. At the Chinese victory celebrations over the "red-haired barbarians" as the Dutch were called by the Chinese, Nan Juyi paraded twelve Dutch soldiers who were captured before the Emperor in Beijing. The Dutch were astonished that their violence did not intimidate the Chinese and at the subsequent Chinese attack on their fort in Penghu since they had thought them timid and from their experience in Southeast Asia had regarded them as a "faint-hearted troupe".

=== 1630s ===
After the Dutch defeat and expulsion from the Pescadores in the 1622–1624, they were completely driven off from China's coast. The pirates Liu Xiang and Li Guozhu also joined the Dutch, and for a time it seemed the Dutch would triumph as the head of a new pirate coalition that operated off the coast of China, with at least 41 pirate junks and 450 Chinese soldiers. However they were decisively defeated by Chinese forces under Admiral Zheng Zhilong at the Battle of Liaoluo Bay in 1633. The Chinese used fireships disguised as warships to fool the Dutch into thinking they were going into pitched battle.

Dutch East India Company attacked Zheng Zhilong's junks which were trading pepper with Jambi, but while the Dutch transferred 32 Chinese prisoners into the Dutch ship, the remaining Chinese managed to slaughter the 13 Dutch sailors on board the Chinese junk and retake the vessel. Zheng Zhilong demanded the Dutch then release the 32 Chinese in 1636. Dutch East India Company blockaded Thai trade in 1664 and in 1661-1662 seized a Thai junk owned by a Persian official in Thailand. The Dutch tried to impede Thai and Chinese competition with the Dutch in the pepper trade at Jambi. The Jambi Sultan temporarily jailed English merchants during violence between the Dutch and English. The Thai and Jambi Sultanate angrily complained against the Dutch over Dutch attacks and attempts to impede Jambi's trade with Chinese and Thai. Chinese junks regularly traded with Jambi, Patani, Siam, and Cambodia. Local Muslim women who dealt in the cloth trade willingly married Han Chinese men in Palembang, Banten, and Jambi who often converted to Islam. The same traders dealt with the Dutch more carefully, especially in Palembang where they aimed to avoid association with the local Dutch who were infamous for maltreatment of indigenous women.

=== 1660s and 1670s ===
In 1662 the Dutch were defeated and driven off Taiwan at the Siege of Fort Zeelandia by Chinese forces under Zheng Chenggong (Koxinga). The Dutch looted relics and killed monks after attacking a Buddhist complex at Putuoshan on the Zhoushan islands in 1665 during their war against Zheng Chenggong's son Zheng Jing.

Koxinga's son Zheng Jing sent a Chinese commander called Piauwja by the Dutch (Xian Biao 先彪 or Biaoye 彪爷 in Chinese) with hundreds of troops to Cambodia in February 1667 to the court of Cambodian King Paramaraja VIII. Piauwja received the title of Shahbandar of the Chinese community of Cambodia from the King. Piauwja massacred 1,000 Vietnamese men, women and children in Cambodia on behalf of the Cambodian king, who wanted to break free of Vietnamese influence. Piauwja also demanded that the Dutch pay him compensation for confiscating his ships in a naval blockade. Pieter Ketting, the Dutch East India Company's representative in Cambodia only offered to pay 1,000 taels to Piauwja when an advisor to the Cambodian King said he should pay 2,000 taels. Piauwja in response then demanded Ketting pay 6,000 taels, as compensation for a debt that another Chinese merchant working for the Dutch in Batavia owed him. Ketting refused and tried to bribe Cambodian officials to help him, but Piauwja forced Ketting to pay 4,837 taels by seizing Dutch hostages. The Schelvis, another Dutch ship arrived at Cambodian capital's shoreline on the river's mouth, but the river banks low water level rendered the range of the Dutch cannons on the ship useless. The Cambodians forbade fighting between Koxinga's forces and the Dutch on Cambodian waters, so Piaujwa instead attacked the Dutch East India company outpost on land on July 9-10, fatally wounding a Dutch surgeon and killing Ketting immediately along with 3 servants. Jacob van Wijckersloot only survived by escaping to the jungle and hiding for days before reaching the Schelvis and documenting what happened. On 28 October, 1667, the Cambodian King sent a letter to the Dutch in Batavia apologising for the incident, and falsely claiming he executed Piauwja, and arrested three Dutch company employees who he said helped Piauwja against their fellow Dutch. He sent the three arrested Dutch back to Batavia, but Piauwja was in fact alive and was still working for Koxinga in the 1670s, raiding the Qing in Guangdong. Piauwja had also looted all the silk and silver on the Dutch ship Schelvisch before leaving. His name was also written as Pioja by the Dutch. Another account said Piauwja came with 3,000 Chinese troops at Oudong.

Zheng Jing's navy executed thirty four Dutch sailors and drowned eight Dutch sailors after ambushing, looting, and sinking the Dutch fluyt ship Cuylenburg in 1672 on northeastern Taiwan. Only twenty one Dutch sailors escaped to Japan. The ship was going from Nagasaki to Batavia on a trade mission.

== See also ==
- Cambodian–Dutch War
- Trịnh–Nguyễn War
