= David Robinson (disambiguation) =

David Robinson (born 1965) is an American former basketball player who played for Navy and the San Antonio Spurs.

David Robinson may also refer to:

== Entertainment and media ==
- Dave Robinson (music executive) (born 1944), Irish co-founder of Stiff Records
- David G. Robinson (theatre pioneer) (19th century), theatrical pioneer in Northern California
- David Robinson (journalist) (1927–2017), Lincolnshire journalist and author
- David Robinson (film critic) (born 1930), British film critic and author
- David Robinson (drummer) (born 1949), American rock drummer, most notably for The Cars
- David Robinson (reggae singer) (fl. 1970s-1980s), Jamaican reggae singer
- David Robinson (photographer) (born 1973), British photographer and publisher
- David Robinson (artist) (born 1964), Canadian artist
- David C. Robinson, American film producer

== Politics ==
- David I. Robinson (1844–1921), American politician in Massachusetts
- David Robinson (Irish politician) (1882–1943), Irish Fianna Fáil politician and revolutionary
- David Robinson (New Zealand politician) (born 1951), former New Zealand politician of the Labour Party
- David J. Robinson (fl. 2000s), former member of the Ohio House of Representatives

== Religion ==
- David Robinson (bishop), Australian bishop, current bishop of Rockhampton
- David Robinson (priest) (1931–2003), Archdeacon of Blackburn

== Sports ==
=== Association football ===
- Dave Robinson (footballer, born 1948) (1948–2016), English footballer
- David Robinson (footballer, born 1965), English footballer
- David Robinson (footballer, born 1969), English footballer

=== Other sports ===
- Dave Robinson (American football) (born 1941), American football player
- Dave Robinson (baseball) (born 1946), American baseball player
- David Robinson (Australian cricketer) (born 1958), Australian cricketer
- David Robinson (English cricketer) (born 1938), English cricketer
- Dave Robinson (rugby league) (1944–2022), English rugby league footballer of the 1960s and 1970s
- David Barstow Robinson (born 1988), founder of the Ladds 500 cycling event in Portland, Oregon, United States

== Others ==
- David C. Robinson (steamboat captain) (1833–1874), steamboat captain on the Colorado River from 1857 to 1873
- Paschal Robinson or David Robinson (1870–1948), Irish ecclesiastical diplomat
- David Moore Robinson (1880–1958), American classical archaeologist
- David "Chippy" Robinson (1897–1967), St. Louis armed robber and contract killer
- David Robinson (philanthropist) (1904–1987), British entrepreneur and philanthropist
- David Robinson (horticulturist) (1928–2004), Irish horticultural scientist
- David Robinson (community worker) (fl. 1970s–2020s), British community worker and writer
- David A. Robinson (born 1954), retired U.S. Air Force general
- David B. Robinson (born 1939), retired U.S. Navy vice admiral
- David K. Robinson (born 1954), professor of European history
- David M. Robinson (born 1965), American orientalist
- David G. Robinson (data scientist) (fl. 2010s–2020s), American data scientist
- David Mark Robinson, Australian who, in May 2003, attempted to hijack Qantas Flight 1737
- David C. Robinson, physicist who worked with Stephen Hawking and Brandon Carter

== See also ==
- David Fullerton Robison (1816–1859), member of the U.S. House of Representatives from Pennsylvania
