= On the Rocks =

On the rocks is bartending terminology for a drink served over ice cubes.

On the Rocks may also refer to:

== Literature ==
- On the Rocks: A Political Comedy, a 1932 play by George Bernard Shaw
- On the Rocks (2008 play), a play by Amy Rosenthal, directed by Clare Lizzimore
- Wally and Osborne, formerly On the Rocks, a webcomic by Tyler Martin

== Music ==
- On The Rocks, University of Oregon a cappella group founded by Peter Hollens
- On the Rocks (The Byron Band album)
- On the Rocks (Midland album), 2017
- "On the Rocks" (song), a 2014 song by Nicole Scherzinger
- "On the Rocks", a single by Grieves from the album Together/Apart
- "On the Rocks", a 1958 song by The Ramrocks
- "On the Rocks", a 1979 song by the Sutherland Brothers
- "On the Rocks", a 1981 song by Spookey
- "On the Rocks", a 1981 song by David Robinson
- "On the Rocks", a 1982 song by Gillan
- "On the Rocks", a 1995 song by The Delta 72
- "On the Rocks", a 2014 song by The Rural Alberta Advantage
- "On the Rocks", a vocaloid song by OSTER project featuring Kaito and Meiko

== Television, film, and radio ==
- On the Rocks (American TV series), an American sitcom that aired from 1975 to 1976 on ABC
- On the Rocks (British TV series), a 1969 British television situation comedy series
- On the Rocks (film), a 2020 American comedy-drama film
- On the Rocks (XM), a radio station provided by XM Satellite Radio

== See also ==
- Love on the Rocks (disambiguation)
