= On the Rock =

On the Rock may refer to:

- On the Rock (Andrés Calamaro album)
- On the Rock (Israel Vibration album)

== See also ==
- On the Rocks (disambiguation)
