= Banditry =

Type of organized crime committed by outlaws

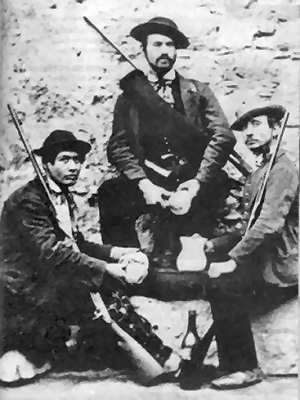
Carmine Crocco's lieutenant Agostino Sacchitiello and members of his band from Bisaccia, Campania photographed in 1862

Banditry is the act of marauding or robbing, sometimes in semi-organized groups. A person who engages in banditry is known as a bandit and primarily commits crimes such as robbery and brigandage, piracy, and thievery.

== Definitions ==
The word bandit, a word which was in English use around the 1590s, derives from Italian bandito (plural banditi). The word banditry was first used in 1861. The usually refers to an individual who was outlawed by the state and engaged in theft.

In modern usage the word has become a synonym for "thief", hence the term "one-armed bandit" for gambling machines that can leave the gambler with no money.

== Types ==
=== Social bandit ===
"Social banditry" is a term invented by the historian Eric Hobsbawm in his 1959 book Primitive Rebels, a study of popular forms of resistance that also incorporate behaviour characterized as illegal. He further expanded the field in the 1969 study Bandits. Social banditry is a widespread phenomenon that has occurred in many societies throughout recorded history, and forms of social banditry still exist, as evidenced by piracy and organized crime syndicates.

== History ==
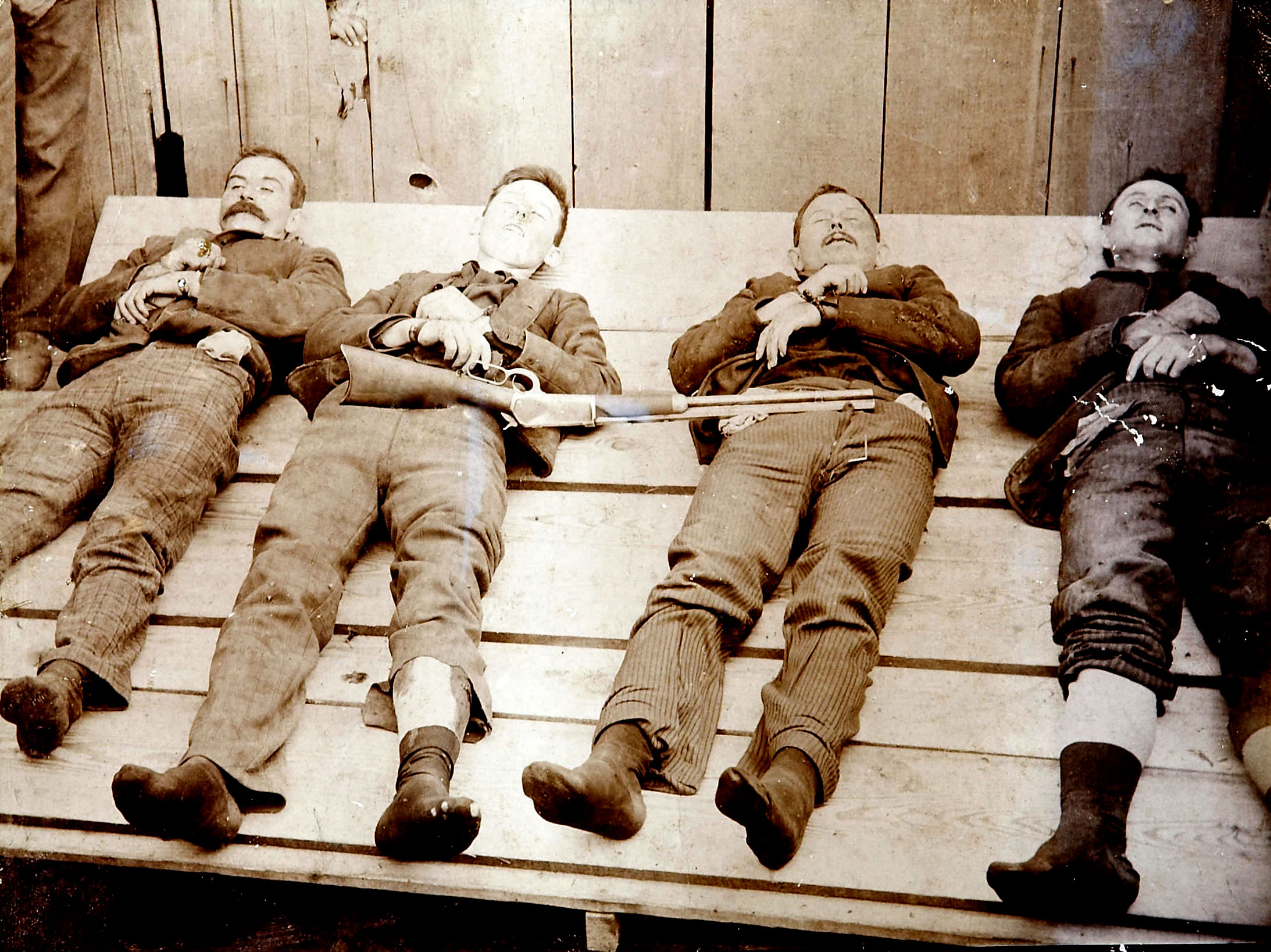
Members of the Dalton Gang on display following the Battle of Coffeyville in 1892 – left to right: Bill Power, Bob Dalton, Grat Dalton, and Dick Broadwell

=== Europe ===
==== Medieval period ====
Tradition depicts medieval German robber barons as bandits.

In France and other parts of western Europe, large bands of armed men became an important form of banditry during periods of prolonged warfare. During the Hundred Years' War, groups of routiers—mercenaries and soldiers who supported themselves through warfare and plunder—operated across large areas of France. After the Treaty of Brétigny in 1360, unemployed soldiers formed or joined bands that continued to raid and pillage the countryside, including the notorious Tard-Venus. Some of these companies were highly organised and could number hundreds or thousands of armed men.

==== Early modern period ====
In the Balkans under Ottoman rule, armed groups known as hajduks were active from at least the 15th century. They generally operated in small bands from mountainous areas and preyed on officials, merchants and travellers. Later Balkan traditions often portrayed them as popular heroes and fighters against Ottoman rule, although their activities also included ordinary banditry.

A 17th-century bandit attack as depicted by Flemish painter Cornelis de Wael.

In Italy in the late 16th century, the bandit Marco Sciarra assembled several smaller groups into a large and well-organised armed force operating between the Papal States and the Kingdom of Naples. He styled himself the Re della Campagna ("King of the Campagna") and was able to resist government forces for several years. His activities illustrate how bandit groups could acquire military organisation and political influence in early modern Europe.

During the five years before his death in 1590, about 5,000 bandits were executed under Pope Sixtus V, while an estimated 27,000 others were reportedly still at large in Central Italy.

In the Anglo-Scottish borderlands, the Border Reivers carried out organised raids, livestock theft and other forms of cross-border banditry throughout the 16th century.

==== Brigandry in Italy ====
Banditry or brigandry, while existing in Italy since pre-historic times, became particularly widespread in Southern Italy following the Unification of Italy in the 1860s. Brigands such as Carmine Crocco, Michelina Di Cesare, Ninco Nanco, and Nicola Napolitano were active during this period and eventually developed followings as folk heroes. Brigandage in Southern Italy continued sporadically following the 1870s, with brigands such as Giuseppe Musolino and Francesco Paolo Varsallona forming bandit gangs at the turn of the 20th century. Salvatore Giuliano and Gaspare Pisciotta formed a brigand group in Sicily in the 1940s to 1950 and similarly became known as folk heroes. Sardinia has a long history of banditry, with the bandit and kidnapping group anonima sarda being the most recent manifestation of this phenomenon.

==== Nazi-occupied Europe ====
In Nazi-occupied Europe from 1939 to 1945, the German doctrine of Bandenbekämpfung ("bandit fighting") portrayed opponents of the Greater Germanic Reich as "bandits" — dangerous criminals who did not deserve any consideration as human beings. German authorities suppressed partisan opposition with maximum force and, usually, with the mass slavery of civilians from partisan-controlled areas.

=== China ===
==== Ming China ====
Banditry (Dao, qiangdao) in Ming China (1368–1644) was defined by the Ming government as "'robbery by force" punishable by death". But throughout the dynasty, people had entered into the occupation of banditry for various reasons and the occupation of banditry was fluid and temporary.

By the late Ming dynasty, banditry had developed into large-scale armed rebellions. From the late 1620s, droughts and famines contributed to the growth of mobile rebel groups in northern and central China, commonly described by the Ming government as roving bandits (liúkòu). Some groups grew into large armies and established control over extensive territories. Among their most prominent leaders were Li Zicheng and Zhang Xianzhong, whose forces contributed to the collapse of Ming rule. Li Zicheng captured Beijing in 1644, following which the last Ming emperor committed suicide, while Zhang Xianzhong established the short-lived Xi dynasty in Sichuan.

===== Causes and opportunities =====
Ming China was largely an agricultural society and contemporary observers remarked that famine and subsequent hardship often gave rise to banditry. In his 1991 book Disorder under Heaven: Collective Violence in the Ming Dynasty, James W. Tong uses data from provincial and prefectural gazetteers of the Ming and the Qing Dynasties to analyze patterns of violence during the Ming Dynasty. Tong analyzes that the peasants had to make a "rational choice" between surviving harsh conditions and surviving through illegal activities of banditry. He identifies multiple important factors in peasants' calculation of whether to become bandits or not, such as the government's ability to punish bandits. Tong concludes that his "rational choice model predicts that there would be more rebellions and banditry where the likelihood of surviving hardship is minimal but the likelihood of surviving as an outlaw is maximal." As a result, Tong finds that banditry, like other types of collective violence, had a spatial and temporal pattern. Banditry was especially pervasive in the southern provinces (most notably Guangdong and Fujian) and the second half of the dynasty (1506-1644).

However, the Northern China and the middle Ming period (1450–1525) had their fair share of banditry. Mounted banditry was the major and pervasive type of banditry plaguing roads around the capital Beijing and its surrounding areas, administrated and named as the Capital Region. Xiangmazei (whistling arrow bandits) was a category of mounted bandits named after their practice of firing whistling arrows to alert their victims. Whistling arrow bandits had troubled the Capital Region throughout the first three decades of the sixteenth century. They had posed such serious threat that special police attention was given to them and failure to arrest them on time incurred severer punishment (further information on Ming justice system can be found in History of criminal justice).

Ming historian David M. Robinson identifies some prominent causes of banditry in the Capital Region. The Region was agriculturally disadvantaged due to constant flood, and thus the peasants often lived in poverty. Furthermore, the Region's economy provided plentiful opportunities for highway robbery. In addition to the highly developed economy of Beijing, the Region also contained numerous commercial cities; these cities not only attracted merchants but also bandits. Robinson also points out that many eunuchs in Beijing resorted to banditry. As Shih-Shan Henry Tsai explained, self-castration was just another way to escape impoverishment; and when a group of eunuchs failed to find employment in the palace, they often turned to mob violence.

The Capital Region also housed a huge number of soldiers with Ming's system of hereditary military and a major portion of bandits were actually soldiers stationed in the region. In 1449, Mongolian soldiers in the service of Ming attacked and plundered Beijing area. Another report of 1489 attested that soldiers had raided in Henan province. Robinson points out that "dire economic straits" forced soldiers to use illegal means to make a living. Also, policies and conditions in the Capital Region provided opportunities for soldiers/bandits to dodge governmental punishment. During the Ming Dynasty, military and civil jurisdictions were separated. This was especially troubling when soldiers lived physically far from their superiors: when soldiers committed robbery, civil officials had no jurisdiction nor power to apprehend them. Policy of transporting nearby garrisons to Beijing for annual training also created opportunities for banditry. One official reported that soldiers travelling by the Grand Canal from adjacent garrisons to the capital committed robbery and murder against civilian travelers and merchants; on the land, these soldiers had fallen into mounted banditry as well.

===== Techniques, organization, livelihood, and risks =====
Bandits’ technique involved the martial skills to use various weapons, ranging from bows and arrows to swords. Another important skill was horsemanship, especially in the Northern Capital Region, where mounted banditry concentrated. As shown above, a large number of bandits were actually garrison soldiers and had access to and able usage of weapons and armors. Another skill was the ability to deploy road blocks to stop and prey on travelers.

Once they forcefully acquired goods and commodities, bandits had to sell them. One 1485 official report revealed that local people, some probably working as fences (see Fences in Ming China), purchased stolen animals and goods from highway bandits at lower prices. Robinson further points out that "[a] widespread network to dispose of the stolen livestock linked" towns in the Capital Region to nearby provinces.

Neither the career nor the identity of a bandit was permanent. Some bandits actually had a settled life and were even married. Veritable Records of the Ming Dynasty relates that the great bandit Zhang Mao lived in a big mansion in his hometown Wenan. Similarly, Zhang's comrades Liu Brothers and Tiger Yang had wives and children.

Bandits often operated in groups under one or more leaders. These charismatic leaders were not only skilled in fighting and riding but also possessed material and social capital. One exemplary leader was Zhang Mao of Wenan. He had assembled a massive following and by using his connection and wealth, he managed to bribe and befriend important eunuchs in the court.

Of course, the Ming government used a heavy hand to crack down on banditry. Local commanders and constables were responsible for apprehending bandits, but the emperors often dispatched special censors to cope with rampant banditry. Ning Gao was one of the censors of 1509, and he employed gruesome means such as display of severed heads and body parts to kill off existing bandits and to intimidate potential ones. Other than escaping to difficult terrains, powerful bandits used their connections with high-standing figures in the capital to negotiate safety. In one occasion, the influential eunuch Zhang Zhong helped his sworn brother Zhang Mao to negotiate with a commander sent to hunt down local bandits. However, such patronage did not guarantee immunity. An effective and determined official, empowered by influential superiors or eunuchs, could pose a severe threat to bandits’ survival. Through a well-planned raid, Ning Gao, a client of another powerful eunuch Liu Jin, successfully wounded and captured Zhang Mao, who was then transported to Beijing and executed.

===== Future paths of bandits =====
Even though bandits were subject to capital punishment, they could still be incorporated into the regime, serving as local police forces and personal soldiers employed by officials to secure order and suppress bandits. Such transition was not permanent and could often be reversed. Tiger Yang once served as a personal military retainer of the aforementioned Ning Gao before turning to banditry; similarly, when facing unemployment, some of Ning's former "bandit catchers" simply joined the bandit leaders Liu Brothers.

The career of banditry often led leaders to assemble more bandits and army deserters and organize predatory gangs into active rebel groups. One example was Gao Yingxiang, who started as a mounted bandit in Shaanxi and later became an important rebel leader in late Ming. Another example would be Deng Maoqi, a bandit in Fujian who perpetrated robbery on roads and in villages in the late 1440s. His gang of bandits eventually grew into a rebel army and Deng conducted attacks on the government in Fujian. Bandit-rebels were not only common in late Ming. In 1510 and 1511, several bandit gangs under the leadership of Liu Brothers, Tiger Yang raided and plundered Shandong and Henan. Their illegal actions eventually evolved into open rebellion against the Ming Dynasty as they blatantly besieged cities, seized imperial weaponry, extended area of operation southward, and even assumed rhetoric and attire of an imperial dynasty. The rebellion took the Ming almost two years to crush.

Similarly, small groups of local bandits could also end up joining larger groups of rebels. Robinson points out that bandits obviously perceived the benefits of supporting rebel cause but they also could be repelled to join; as a result, the 1510s rebels attracted a lot of local bandits and outlaws as they moved from one place to another.

==== Republican period ====
Marauding was one of the most common peasant reactions to oppression and hardship. In early Republican China, the growth of warlord armies during the Warlord era was also accompanied by a dramatic increase in bandit activity exploiting the lawlessness. By 1930, the total bandit population was estimated to be 20 million.

== List ==
=== Americas ===
- Banditry in Chile
- Cangaço, banditry in Northeast Region, Brazil
- Jagunço

=== Asia ===
- Dacoity, Hindi term for banditry
- Honghuzi
- Nian
- Shanlin
- Thuggee

=== Europe ===
- Abrek, Anti-Cossack/Russian guerilla raiders in the North Caucasus, especially Chechnya
- Bagaudae, bandits around the Pyrenees in the Roman Empire
- Betyárs, bandits in Kingdom of Hungary
- Border reivers
- Brigandage in the Two Sicilies, bandits in South Italy (1861–65)
- Green Cadres
- Hajduks, bandits in the Balkans
- Kirdzhalis
- Klepht, anti-Ottoman insurgents in Greece and Cyprus
- Opryshky
- Rapparee, Irish guerrillas during the 1690s Williamite war
- Robber baron
- Sardinian banditry
- Uskoks, Croatian Habsburg soldiers during the Ottoman wars in Europe

=== Africa ===
- Nigerian banditry
- Shifta

=== Oceania ===
- Bushranger, bandits in Australia (1790s–1900s)

== See also ==
- Fence—Helping bandits to sell stolen goods
- Henchman
