= Haijin =

Isolationist policy in early modern China

- Chinese: 海禁
- Literal meaning: sea ban
Transcriptions
Standard Mandarin
- Hanyu Pinyin: Hǎijìn

Suoguo
- Traditional Chinese: 鎖國
- Simplified Chinese: 锁国
- Literal meaning: locked (closed) country
Transcriptions
Standard Mandarin
- Hanyu Pinyin: Suǒguó

Biguan Suoguo
- Traditional Chinese: 閉關鎖國
- Simplified Chinese: 闭关锁国
- Literal meaning: closed border and locked country
Transcriptions
Standard Mandarin
- Hanyu Pinyin: Bìguān Suǒguó

The Haijin (海禁) or sea ban was a series of related policies in China restricting private maritime trading during much of the Ming dynasty and early Qing dynasty. The sea ban was an anomaly in Chinese history as such restrictions were unknown during other eras; the bans were each introduced for specific circumstances, rather than based on an age-old inward orientation.

In the first sea ban introduced in 1371 by the Ming founder Zhu Yuanzhang, Ming China's legal foreign trade was limited to tribute missions, placing international trade under a government monopoly. Initially imposed to deal with Japanese piracy amid anti-Ming insurgency, the policy proved unenforceable, and trade continued in forms such as smuggling. The sea ban was counterproductive: smuggling and piracy became endemic periodically (though not continuously), mostly perpetrated by Chinese who had been dispossessed by the policy. Piracy dropped to negligible levels upon the end of the policy in 1567. The policy slowed the growth of China's domestic trade, although the empire's weak enforcement of the policy opened the way for an unprecedented commercial revolution from the mid-1500s onward.

The early Qing dynasty established an anti-insurgent "Great Clearance" (1661–1683), prohibiting all residence and activities on the coast to weaken Ming loyalists. The order also caused considerable devastating effects on communities along the coast, until the Qing seized control of Ming loyalist bases in Taiwan, then reopened coastal ports to foreign trade. Separately, strict travel restrictions were temporarily implemented during the brief trade ban between 1717 and 1727, also to prevent the growth of anti-Qing resistance. Later, the need to control trade gave birth to the Canton System of the Thirteen Factories (1757–1842), where trade was legalised but restricted.

Similar sea bans occurred in other East Asian countries, such as the Sakoku policy in Edo period Japan by the Tokugawa shogunate; or the isolationist policies of Joseon Korea, before they were forced to end their isolation militarily in 1853 and 1876 respectively.

== Ming dynasty ==
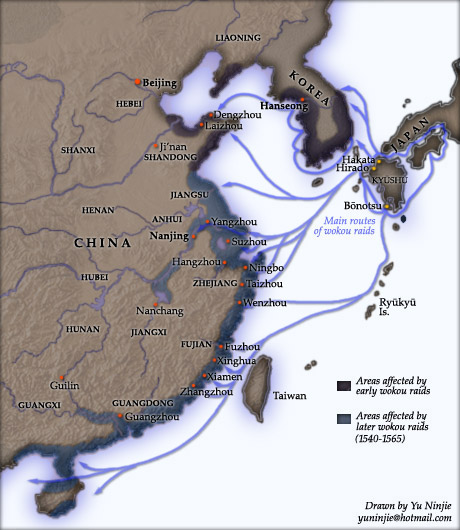
A map of wokou raiding, 14th–16th centuries. The early pirates were mostly based on outlying Japanese islands but targeted the Japanese as well as Korea and Ming China. The later ones were mostly Chinese dispossessed by Ming policy.

=== Background ===
The 14th century was a time of chaos throughout East Asia. The second bubonic plague pandemic began in Mongolia around 1330 and may have killed the majority of the population in Hebei and Shanxi and millions elsewhere. Another epidemic raged for three years from 1351 to 1354. Existing revolts over the government salt monopoly and severe floods along the Yellow River provoked the Red Turban Rebellion. The declaration of the Ming in 1368 did not end its wars with Mongol remnants under Toghon Temür in the north and under the Prince of Liang in the south. King Gongmin of Korea had begun freeing himself from the Mongols as well, retaking his country's northern provinces, when a Red Turban invasion devastated the areas and laid waste to Pyongyang. In Japan, Emperor Daigo II's Kenmu Restoration succeeded in overthrowing the Kamakura shogunate but ultimately simply replaced them with the weaker Ashikaga. The loose control over Japan's periphery led to pirates setting up bases on the realm's outlying islands, particularly Tsushima, Iki, and the Gotōs. These wokou ("Japanese pirates") raided Japan as well as Korea and China. The followers of rival Chinese warlords Zhang Shicheng and Fang Guozhen, who had emerged during the collapse of the Yuan but were defeated by the ascendant Ming, also fled to sea where they cooperated with Japanese outlaws to continue resisting the new dynasty.

The first Ming Emperor, Zhu Yuanzhang, regarded the Japanese piracy as an act of disrespect to his authority: his message to the Japanese that his army would "capture and exterminate your bandits, head straight for your country, and put your king in bonds" received the Ashikaga shogun's reply that "your great empire may be able to invade Japan but our small state is not short of a strategy to defend ourselves", causing the angered Ming Emperor to restrict trade further.

=== Initial implementation ===
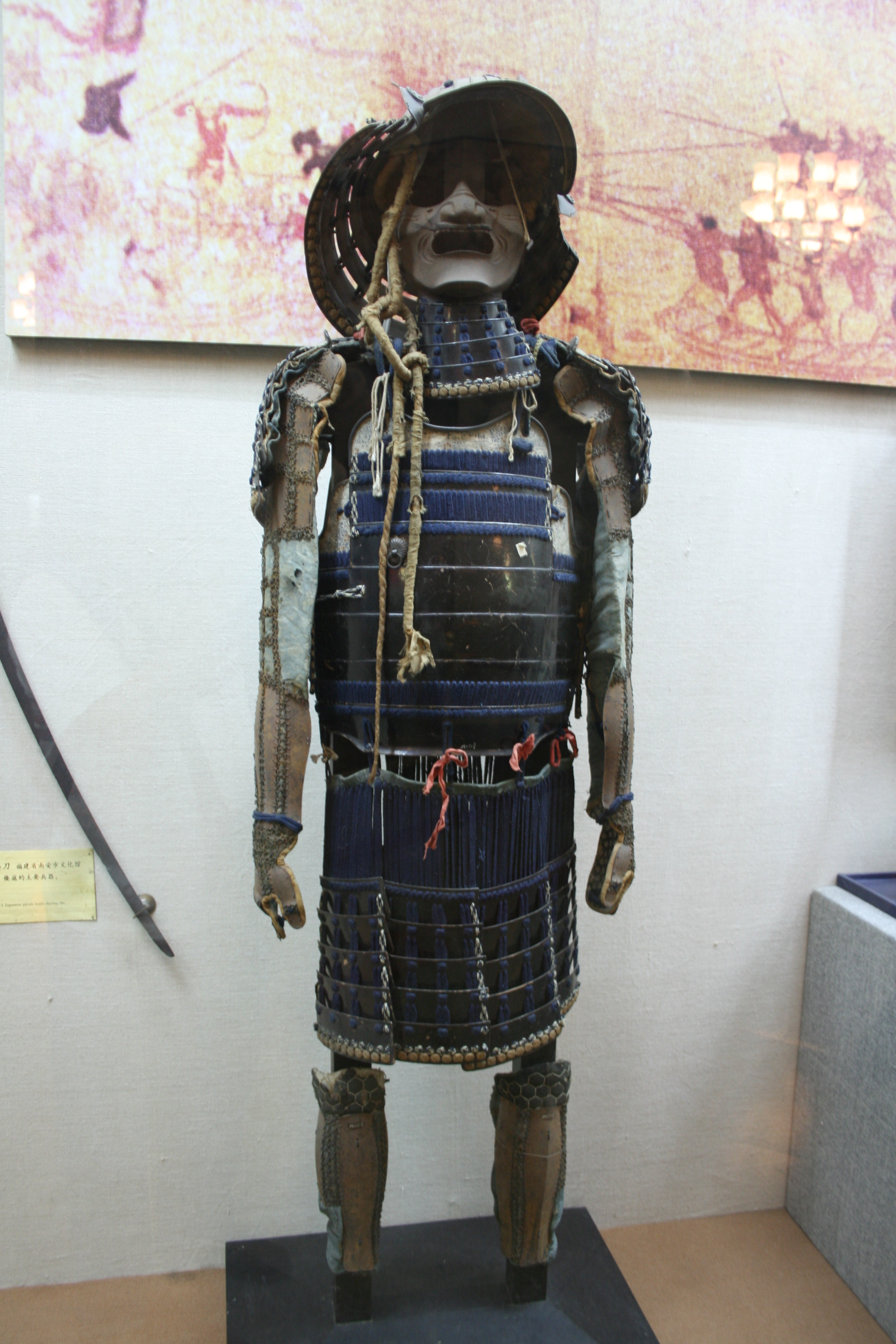
A suit of wokou armour

As a rebel leader, Zhu Yuanzhang promoted foreign trade as a source of revenue. As Emperor, however, he issued the first sea ban in 1371. All foreign trade was to be conducted by official tribute missions, handled by representatives of the Ming Empire and its "vassal" states. Private foreign trade was made punishable by death, with the offender's family and neighbors exiled from their homes. A few years later, in 1384, the Maritime Trade Intendancies (Shibo Tiju Si) at Ningbo, Guangzhou, and Quanzhou were shuttered. Ships, docks, and shipyards were destroyed and ports sabotaged with rocks and pine stakes. Although the policy is now associated with imperial China generally, it was then at odds with Chinese tradition, which had pursued foreign trade as a source of revenue and become particularly important under the Tang, Song, and Yuan.

The Ming's third ruler the Yongle emperor launched the treasure voyages of Zheng He, which were partly intended to monopolise overseas trade under the government. The Yongle emperor succeeded in dramatically reducing piracy after 1403 by striking an agreement with Japan's Ashikaga Yoshimitsu, restoring full tribute trade privileges and sending Ming fleets to Japan to help defeat the pirates. The initial wave of Japanese pirates were independently dealt with by Chŏng Mong-ju and Imagawa Sadayo, who returned their booty and slaves to Korea; Ashikaga Yoshimitsu delivered 20 more to China in 1405, which boiled them alive in a cauldron in Ningbo.

However, Emperor Yingzong of Ming's capture at the Battle of Tumu in 1449 greatly increased Mongol boldness in frontier attacks, while the still-growing private overseas trade caused price competition for the Ming government's import purchases, such as warhorses for the northern frontier. Hence, while Chinese trade within Asia continued after the treasure voyages, the Ming shifted their resources away from maritime affairs to deal with the Mongol threat. As the Ming became increasingly focused on their north, the court also neglected tributary trade missions arriving at the maritime frontier; after 1500, maritime tribute missions mostly stopped and those few that continued were treated as purely commercial transactions in the port cities, without visiting the capital. The court thus failed to notice the ensuing rapid changes in global trade. Private, including unauthorised, Chinese trade in Southeast Asia expanded rapidly in the second half of the Ming dynasty. When the Portuguese arrived in Malacca and the Moluccas in the early 1500s, trade patterns shifted as armed European ships started to bypass Muslim merchant networks and engage with private Chinese and Japanese merchants. This rise in private merchants coupled with the court prioritizing the northern frontier led to the collapse of the tribute trade system and its replacement by widespread smuggling.

Under the Jiajing Emperor, after two Japanese factions clashed over the right to conduct the tribute trade mission in 1523, the emperor restricted trade further, causing sea raiders to overrun the entire southeastern coast.

Nonetheless, because the sea ban was added by the Hongwu Emperor to his Ancestral Injunctions, it continued to be broadly kept through most of the rest of his dynasty. For the next two centuries, the rich farmland of the south and the military theaters of the north were linked almost solely by the Jinghang Canal.

=== Rationale ===
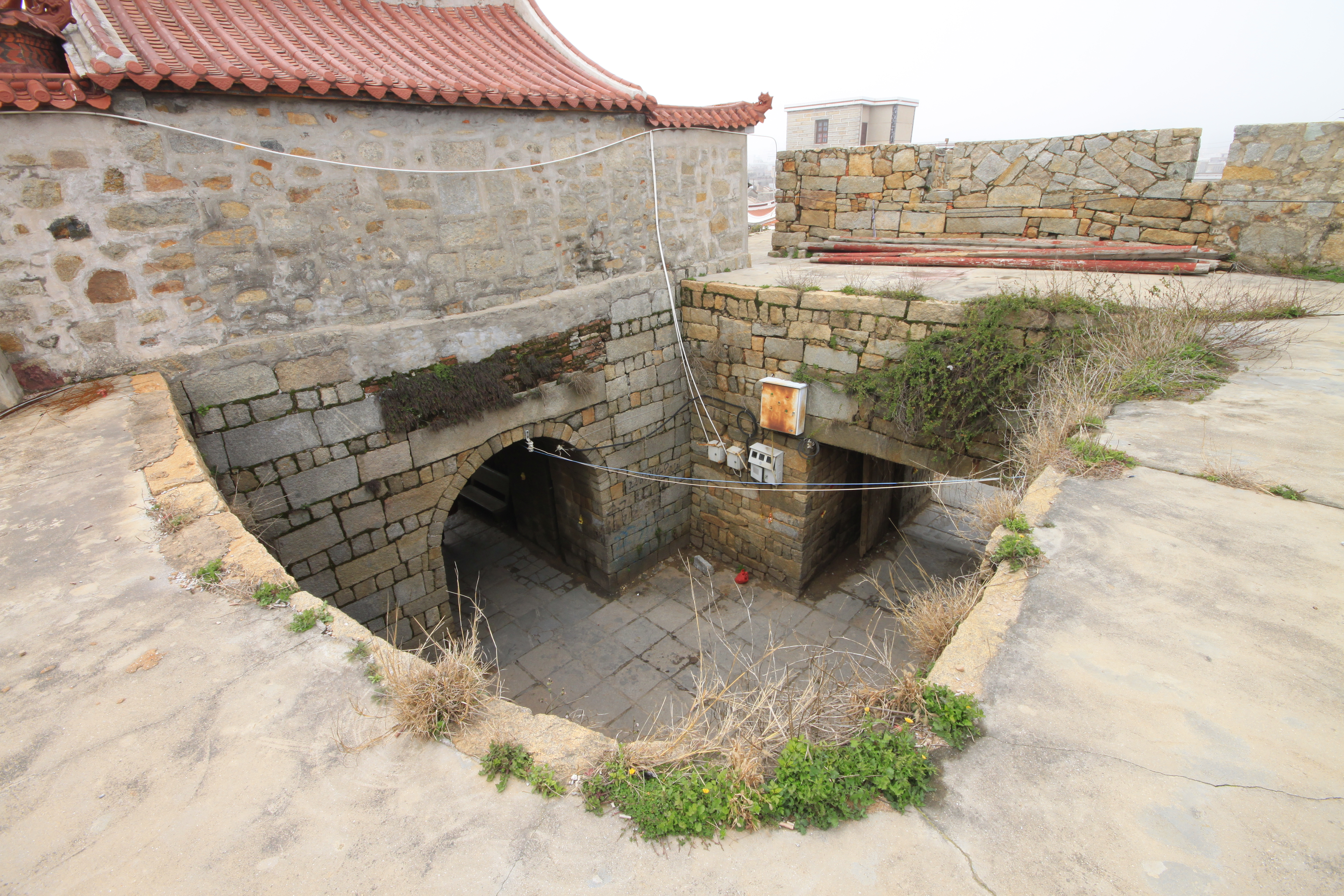
A gate of the Chongwu Fortress in Fujian, built c. 1384

Although the policy has generally been ascribed to national defense against the pirates, it was so obviously counterproductive and yet carried on for so long that other explanations have been offered. The initial conception seems to have been to use the Japanese need for Chinese goods to force them to terms. The Hongwu emperor seemed to indicate that the policy was designed to prevent foreign powers from collaborating with his subjects to challenge his rule; for instance, Srivijaya was banned from trading as the emperor suspected them of spying. It may have been the case that the Hongwu Emperor prioritized protecting his state against the Northern Yuan remnants, giving little attention to the maritime frontier defences. In the absence of a comprehensive frontier policy, the emperor attempted to use trade restrictions to manipulate foreign states like Japan and the former followers of rival Chinese warlords such as Zhang Shicheng and Fang Guozhen into submission. The emperor's mention of the restrictions in his Ancestral Injunctions may have been responsible for their continuation.

The usage of trade was also a powerful tool to entice foreign governments to abide by the tributary system and pressure uncooperative leaders. The Ming state hence had a vested interest in maintaining the sea ban to protect the government trade monopoly and its associated benefits in diplomacy. This interest, while powerful, may not have been enough on its own to motivate Chinese leaders to maintain the bans. The tribute system created undue stress according to the Ming Shilu. In an entry from May 1390, it is detailed that: "...the transport was difficult and it caused hardship for the people." Entries like these reflect the strain that a centralized, tribute-based trade system may have placed on the Chinese public. It is also possible that the bans were counteractive to China's economic growth. Tribute missions were so demanding that the government often placed restrictions on how often foreign traders could come to court.

Parallels with Song and Yuan measures restricting outflows of bullion have led some to argue that it was intended to support the Hongwu Emperor's printing of fiat currency, whose use was continued by his successors as late as 1450. (By 1425, rampant counterfeiting and hyperinflation meant people were already trading at about 0.014% of their original value.)

Kangying Li asserts that the sea ban was a side effect of Zhu Yuanzhang's desire to elevate Confucian humaneness (仁, ren) and eliminate greed from the realm's foreign relations. In Li's view, the sea ban could be linked to other early Ming policies such as sumptuary laws and land redistribution which attempted to curb luxury and wealth inequality, and hence shore up the legitimacy of the Ming regime. For the emperor, wealthy merchants living decadent lifestyles and buying up huge tracts of land were a threat to the smallholding peasantry which he saw as the foundation of Ming power. Others suggest that the sea ban was a ploy to weaken the realm's southern subjects to the benefit of the central government.

=== Effects ===
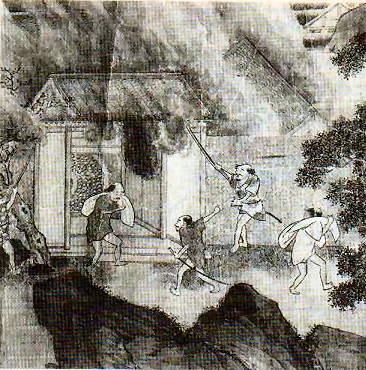
Attacks by the wokou. 14th-century painting

Although the sea ban left the Ming army free to extirpate the remaining Yuan loyalists and secure China's borders, it tied up local resources. 74 coastal garrisons were established from Guangzhou in Guangdong to Shandong; under the Yongle Emperor, these outposts were notionally manned by 110,000 subjects. The loss of income from taxes on trade contributed to chronic funding difficulties throughout the Ming, particularly for Zhejiang and Fujian provinces. The Ming also spent heavily on managing the tribute missions: the cost of accommodation for the embassy, escorting them to the capital and back, and presenting diplomatic gifts outweighed any profits the Ming received through the tribute trade.

The policy offered too little—decennial tribute trade missions—to meet the massive Japanese demand for Chinese goods, forcing the populace into smuggling for survival and worsening instability along the coast. Whenever coastal defences attempted to interfere with the smuggling, the smugglers would turn to pillaging and kidnapping for ransom, increasing the problem it was purporting to solve. In the 16th century Jiajing wokou raids, the "Japanese", "dwarf", and "eastern barbarian" pirates were mostly non-Japanese.

The sea ban was largely unenforceable from its earliest years, and no effective enforcement was ever implemented. Local authorities themselves were frequently involved in the illicit trade, and usually ignored edicts to restrict trade. Military officers brokered trade deals and the wealthy families in the coastal settlements depended on its income. Ordinary workers found employment in trade-related industries. Many of the official posts to enforce trade regulations were left vacant and the court generally ignored the issue of overseas trade. In the 1520s the emperor rejected all attempts to halt illegal trade as these came from officials who had opposed the emperor's policy on rituals, and very little trade took place under governmental channels instead of illicit means. The Grand Secretary of the court in the 1530s was from coastal Zhejiang province, and he proceeded to block any attempt to enforce the sea ban. The most significant attempt to crush out the illicit trade was made by Zhu Wan, an official appointed by the court in the 1540s, but just as he was making headway in wiping out the smugglers he was removed by the court on accusations of unauthorised killings. Bribery and disinterest occasionally permitted more leeway, as when the Portuguese began trading at Guangzhou (1517), Shuangyu ("Liampo"), and Quanzhou ("Chincheu"), but crackdowns also occurred, as with the expulsion of the Portuguese in the 1520s, on the islands off Ningbo and Zhangzhou in 1547, or at Yuegang in 1549. The Portuguese were permitted to settle at Macao in 1557, but only after several years of helping the Chinese suppress piracy.

Hence, trade with Japan continued unobstructed despite the embargo, through Chinese smugglers, Southeast Asian ports, or Portuguese; China remained entirely integrated in the world trading system. According to Kaoru Sugihara, China's restrictions on trade were less stringent than feudal restrictions on merchants in Europe and Japan, and Chinese traders relentlessly sought out foreign markets for Chinese exports. China's merchants from the mid-1500s prospered as much as those of any other nation operating in Asian waters.

On the other hand, coupled with the end of the expensive treasure voyages, the sea ban had the effect of suspending development of Chinese long-distance shipbuilding and navigation, replacing those with shorter Chinese smuggling routes in the East China Sea and South China Sea.

=== Global trade developments ===
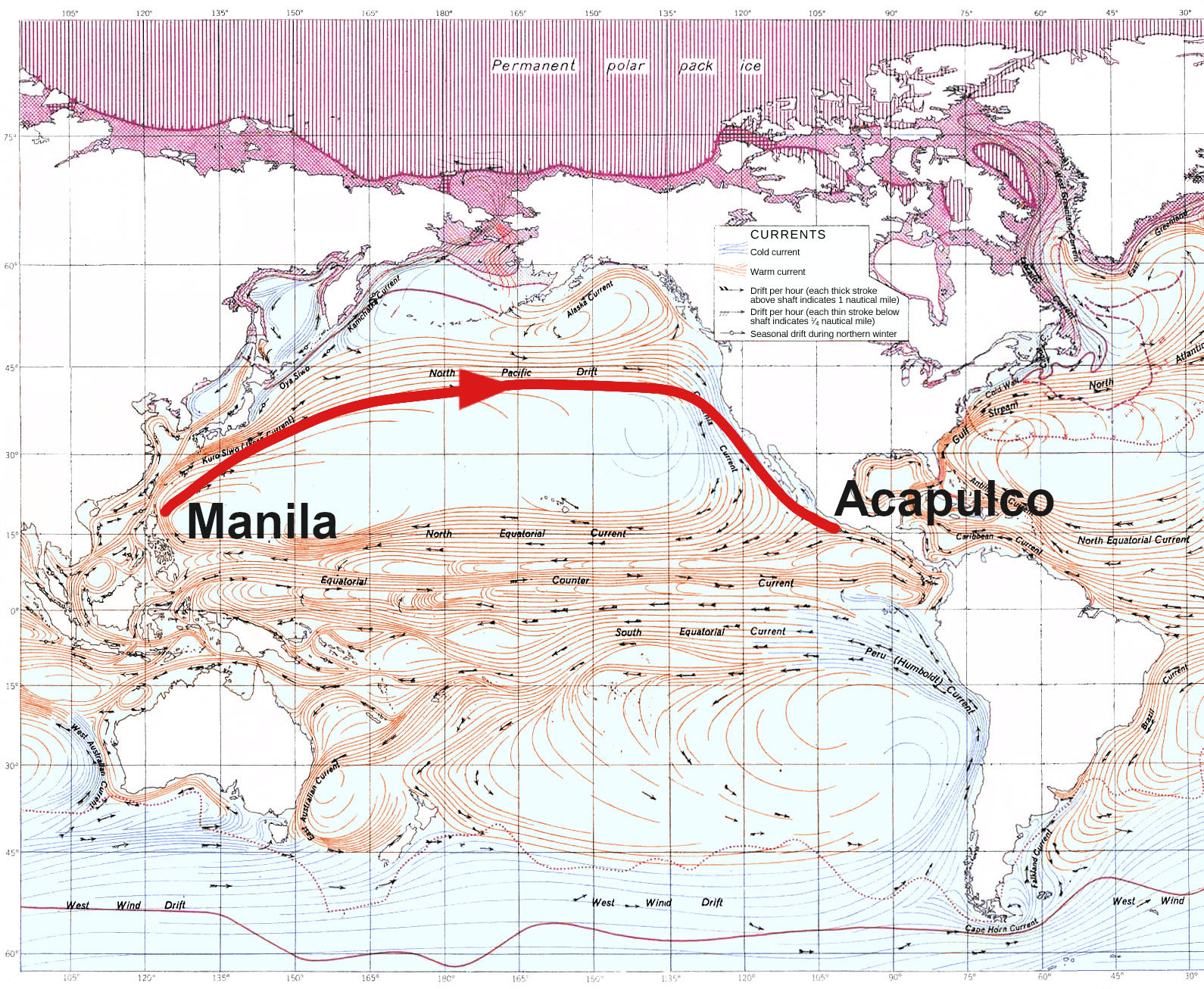
Northerly trade route as used by eastbound Manila galleons

European nations had a great desire for Chinese goods such as silk and porcelain, but Europeans did not have any goods which China desired except silver. Silver hence became the primary export to China to make up for the trade deficit. Aware of China's shortage of silver for use as currency in China's surging economy, Japanese warlords in Kyushu sought to increase silver production, needed to trade for Chinese luxury goods in high demand in Japan. From the 1540s, silver imports into China acted as the cog running the wheel of global trade.

Spain discovered vast amounts of silver, such as in the Potosí silver mines, to fuel their trade. Spanish America became the world's cheapest source of silver, producing 40,000 tons of silver in 200 years. The ultimate destination for the mass amounts of silver produced in the world was China. From 1500 to 1800, Mexico and Peru produced about 80% of the world's silver with 30% of it eventually ending up in China. In the late 16th and early 17th century, Japan also heavily exported silver into China. The discovery of the Iwami silver mines triggered Chinese merchants to swarm at Kyushu ports by 1540, overpowering the Ming's ability to regulate trade through the tributary system and turning the island of Shuangyu into a major smuggling post for silver imports.

While large amounts of silver crossed the Pacific directly from the Americas, major outposts for the silver trade were in Southeast Asia such as in the Philippines, and Manila served as a primary outpost for exchange of goods between the Americas, Japan, India, Indonesia and China. The galleon trade was supplied by merchants largely from ports of Fujian who traveled to Manila to sell the Spaniards spices, porcelain, ivory, lacquerware, silk cloth and other valuable commodities. Trade with Ming China via Manila served as a major source of revenue for the Spanish Empire and for Spanish in the Philippines. The trade became so lucrative that Seville merchants petitioned their king to protect the monopoly of Seville's Casa de Contratación. This led to a 1593 decree that set a limit of two ships sailing each year from either Acapulco and Manila, with one kept in reserve in each port, and further limits on cargo quantities. Smuggling became widespread as Chinese and Spanish merchants cooperated to circumvent these Spanish rules.

==== Lifting ====
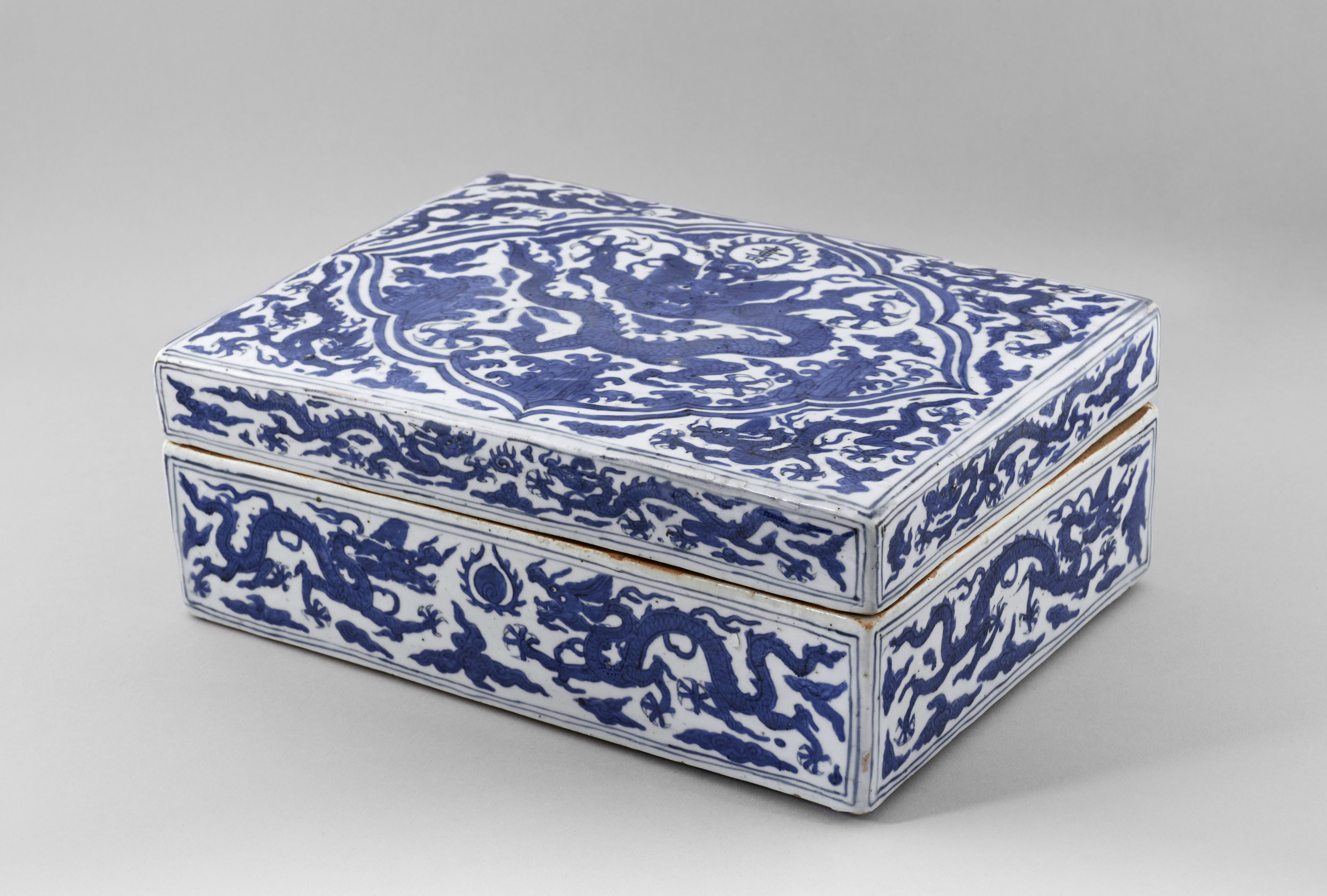
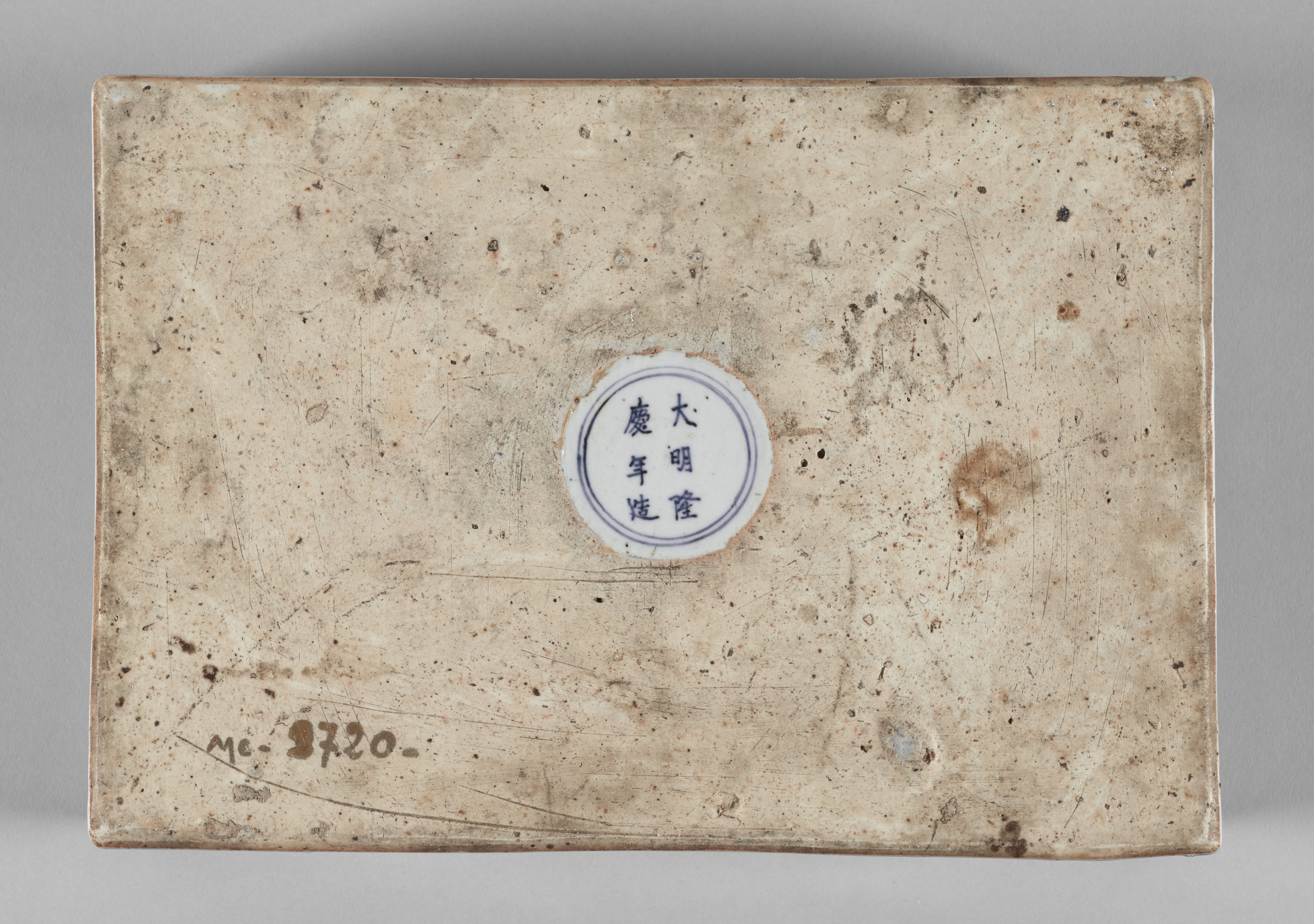
Porcelain, a valuable trade commodity, from the Longqing era. The underside displays the porcelain mark "Made in the Longqing [era] of the Great Ming."

Pirate-smuggler groups continued to proliferate, and one such outlaw Wang Zhi established a base at Hirado and the Gotō Islands in Japan and declared himself the King of Hui (徽, named after his home region of Huizhou in Anhui province). In 1552, Wang sent a petition to the Ming court to abolish the sea ban. Although Wang was executed by the Ming in 1559 while attempting to reconcile with the court, it was clear to many court officials that the cause of piracy was the sea ban, and lobbied for its abolition.

Piracy dropped to negligible levels only after the general abolition of the policy in 1567 upon the ascension of the Longqing Emperor and at the urging of the governor of Fujian Tu Zemin. Chinese merchants for both maritime and overland trade could apply for permits to engage in all foreign trade except with Japan (although some still traded there anyway, and Japanese traders also set themselves up in Southeast Asia to trade with incoming Chinese) or involving weapons or other contraband goods; these included iron, sulfur, and copper. The number of foreign traders was capped by a license and quota system; no trading could take them away from China for longer than a year. The lifting of the sea ban coincided with the arrival of the first Spanish galleons from the Americas, creating a global trade link that would not be interrupted until the following century.

Maritime trade intendancies were re-established at Guangzhou and Ningbo in 1599, and Chinese merchants turned Yuegang (modern Haicheng, Fujian) into a thriving port.

The end of the sea ban did not mark an imperial change of heart, however, so much as a recognition that the weakness of the later Ming state made it impossible to continue the prohibition. The state continued to attempt to regulate trade as heavily as it could, and foreigners were restricted to doing business through approved agents, with prohibitions against any direct business with ordinary Chinese. Accommodations could be made, but were slow in coming: the merchants of Yuegang were trading heavily with the Spanish within a year of Maynila's 1570 conquest by Martín de Goiti but it was not until 1589 that the throne approved the city's requests for more merchant licenses to expand the trade. A 1613 edict prohibited maritime trade between the lands north and south of the Yangtze River, attempting to put a stop to captains claiming to be heading to Jiangsu and then diverting to Japan. Fu Yuanchu's 1639 memorial to the throne made the case that trade between Fujian and Dutch Formosa had made bans entirely unworkable.

== Qing dynasty ==
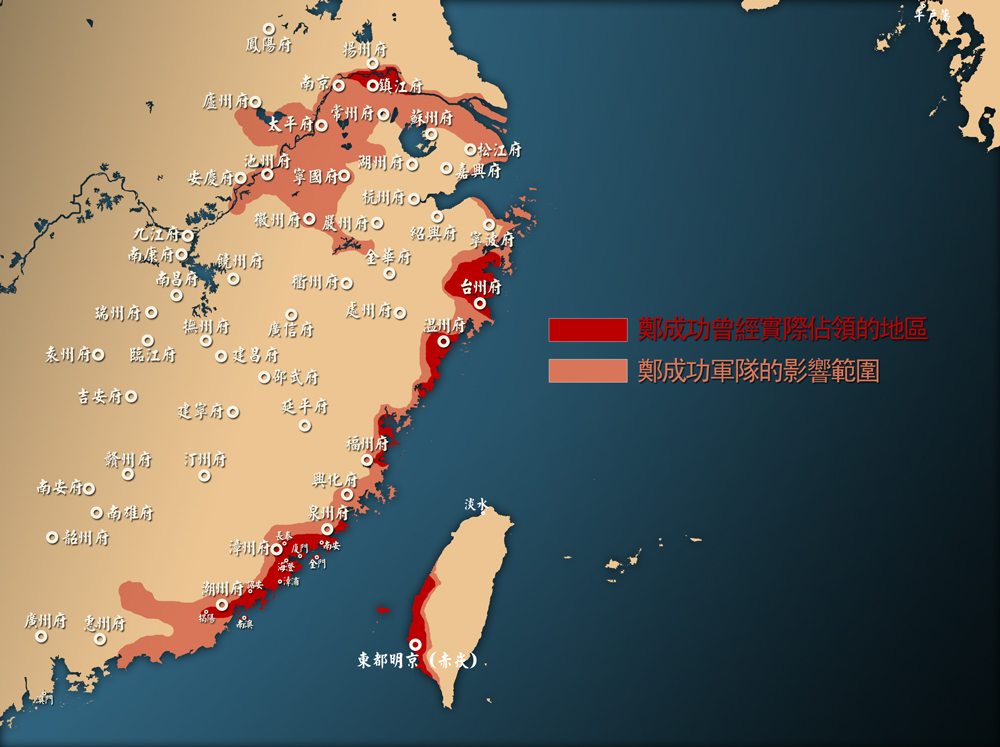
Territory held (red) or influenced (pink) by Koxinga and his Ming partisans/pirates

=== Background ===
As the Qing expanded south following their victory at Shanhai Pass, the Southern Ming were supported by the Zheng clan. Zheng Zhilong surrendered the passes through Zhejiang in exchange for a wealthy retirement, but his son Zheng Chenggong—better known by his Hokkien honorific Koxinga—continued to resist from Xiamen but were driven from their mainland bases in 1661. After wresting its control from the Dutch, the House of Koxinga developed Taiwan as the Kingdom of Tungning.

=== Policy ===
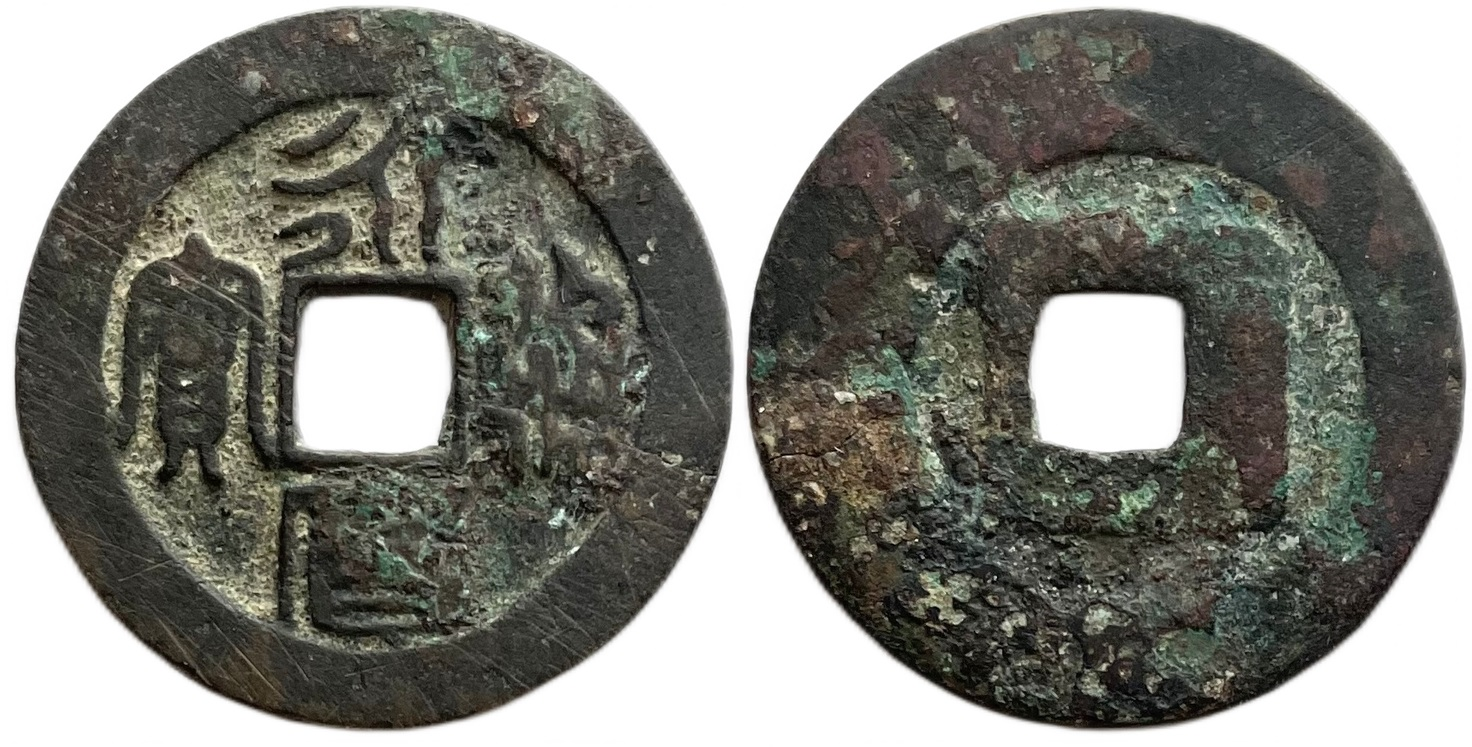
Bronze coin minted in Nagasaki for Koxinga's forces, inscribed Yong Li Tong Bao in seal script

The Qing regent Prince Rui resumed the sea ban in 1647, but it was not effective until a more severe order followed in 1661 upon the ascension of the Kangxi Emperor. In an evacuation as the "Great Clearance" or "Frontier Shift", coastal residents of Guangdong, Fujian, Zhejiang, Jiangsu, and parts of Shandong were required to destroy their property and move inland 30–50 li (about 16–26 km or 10–16 mi), with Qing soldiers erecting boundary markers and enforcing the death penalty on those beyond it. Ships were destroyed, and foreign trade was again limited to that passing through Macao. Checks and adjustments were made the following year, and the inhabitants of five counties—Panyu, Shunde, Xinhui, Dongguan, and Zhongshan—moved again the year after that. Following numerous high-level memorials, the evacuation was no longer enforced after 1669. In 1684, following the destruction of Tungning, other bans were lifted. The year after that, customs offices were established in Guangzhou, Xiamen, Ningbo, and Songjiang to deal with foreign trade.

Repressive Qing policies such as the queue caused Chinese traders to emigrate in such large numbers, however, that the Kangxi Emperor began to fear the military implications. The immigrant community in Jakarta was estimated at 100,000 and imperial agents were sent to Luzon to investigate rumors that a Ming heir was living there. A ban on trade in the "Southern Sea" followed in 1717, with tighter port inspections and travel restrictions. Emigrants were ordered to return to China within the next three years upon penalty of death; those emigrating in future were to face the same punishment.

=== Relaxation ===
Legal trade in the South China Sea resumed in 1727, but the East India Company's discovery that the prices and duties at Ningbo were both much lower than those at Guangzhou prompted them to begin shifting their trade north from 1755 to 1757. The Qianlong Emperor's attempt to discourage this shift through higher fees failed; in the winter of 1757, he declared that—effective the next year—Guangzhou (then romanized as "Canton") was to be the only Chinese port permitted to foreign traders, beginning the Canton System, with its Cohong and Thirteen Factories. Under the Canton system, the Qianlong Emperor restricted foreign merchants to trade only with licensed Chinese merchants, while the British government on their part issued a monopoly charter for trade only to the British East India Company. This arrangement was not challenged until the 19th century when the idea of free trade was popularised in the West. Chinese merchants trading at foreign ports, on the other hand, were not affected by any of these regulations. Chinese merchants could also trade freely and legally with Westerners (Spanish and Portuguese) in Xiamen and Macao, or with any country when trade was conducted through ports outside China such as Manila and Batavia. The Canton system did not completely affect Chinese trade with the rest of the world as Chinese merchants, with their large three-masted ocean junks, were heavily involved in global trade. By sailing to and from Siam, Indonesia and Philippines, they were major facilitators of the global trading system; the era was even described by Carl Trocki as a "Chinese century" of global commerce.

=== Effects ===
The initial Qing sea ban curtailed Koxinga's influence in mainland China and ended with his state's defeat, which brought Taiwan into the Qing Empire.

Nonetheless, it was quite harmful to the Chinese themselves, as documented in governors' and viceroys' memorials to the throne. Even before the Kangxi Emperor's restrictions, Jin Fu's 1659 memorial to the throne argued that the ban on foreign trade was limiting China's access to silver, harmfully restricting the money supply, and that lost trading opportunities cost Chinese merchants 7 or 8 million taels a year. European countries' trade with China was so extensive that they were forced to risk silver deficits to supply merchants in Asia. As supplies of silver decreased in Europe, Europeans had less ability to purchase highly coveted Chinese goods. Merchants were no longer able to sustain the China trade through profits made by selling Chinese goods in the West and were forced to take bullion out of circulation in Europe to buy goods in China.

The policies revived piracy along the coast, while also providing a boon for black markets. The Great Clearance was completely disruptive to China's southern coasts. Of the roughly 16,000 residents of Xin'an County (roughly modern Shenzhen and Hong Kong) who were driven inland in 1661, only 1,648 were recorded returning in 1669. Powerful typhoons that year and in 1671 further destroyed local communities and discouraged resettlement. When trade restrictions were released, Fujian and Guangdong saw enormous outflows of migrants. The conflicts between the former residents and the newcomers such as the Hakka provoked lingering feuds that erupted into local wars in the 1850s and 1860s and that fueled Guangdong's piracy into the 20th century.

The restrictions imposed by the Qianlong Emperor that established the Canton System were highly lucrative for Guangzhou's Cohong—the merchant Howqua became one of the world's wealthiest individuals—and normalized Guangzhou's tax base and inflow of foreign silver. Since imports were mostly bullion, however, there emerged strong pressure on the British—for whom tea had become the national drink over the course of the 17th century—to find any means possible to adjust the balance of trade. This turned out to be opium grown on plantations in India, which became so lucrative and important that the viceroy Lin Zexu's vigorous enforcement of existing laws against the smuggling of opium prompted the First Opium War and the beginning of the unequal treaties that restricted Qing sovereignty in the 19th century. The 1842 Treaty of Nanking opened the ports of Xiamen ("Amoy"), Fuzhou ("Fuchow"), Ningbo ("Ningpo"), and Shanghai, but legal trade continued to be limited to specified ports to the end of the dynasty.

== See also ==
- Economy of the Ming dynasty
- Sakoku
- Great Divergence
