= Apple Gabriel =

Jamaican singer (1955–2020)

- Born: Albert Craig; April 24, 1955
- Died: March 23, 2020 (aged 64)
- Occupation: Singer

Apple Gabriel (born Albert Craig) (April 24, 1955 – March 23, 2020) was a Jamaican singer.

== Biography ==
Gabriel was a member of the Jamaican reggae group Israel Vibration. Like the other members of the group, Gabriel suffered from polio. Gabriel wrote about his experience contracting polio and how he was treated in the community on his official website on the ‘History’ section.

He left the group in c. 1996, and recorded three albums with RAS Records, TP Records, and Reper.

== Discography ==
- An Apple A Day (1994, Reper)
- Another Moses (1999, RAS Records)
- Give Me M.T.V (2001, TP Records)
- Teach Them Right (2010, jahsolidrock)
