= Charles Dorman Robinson =

American painter

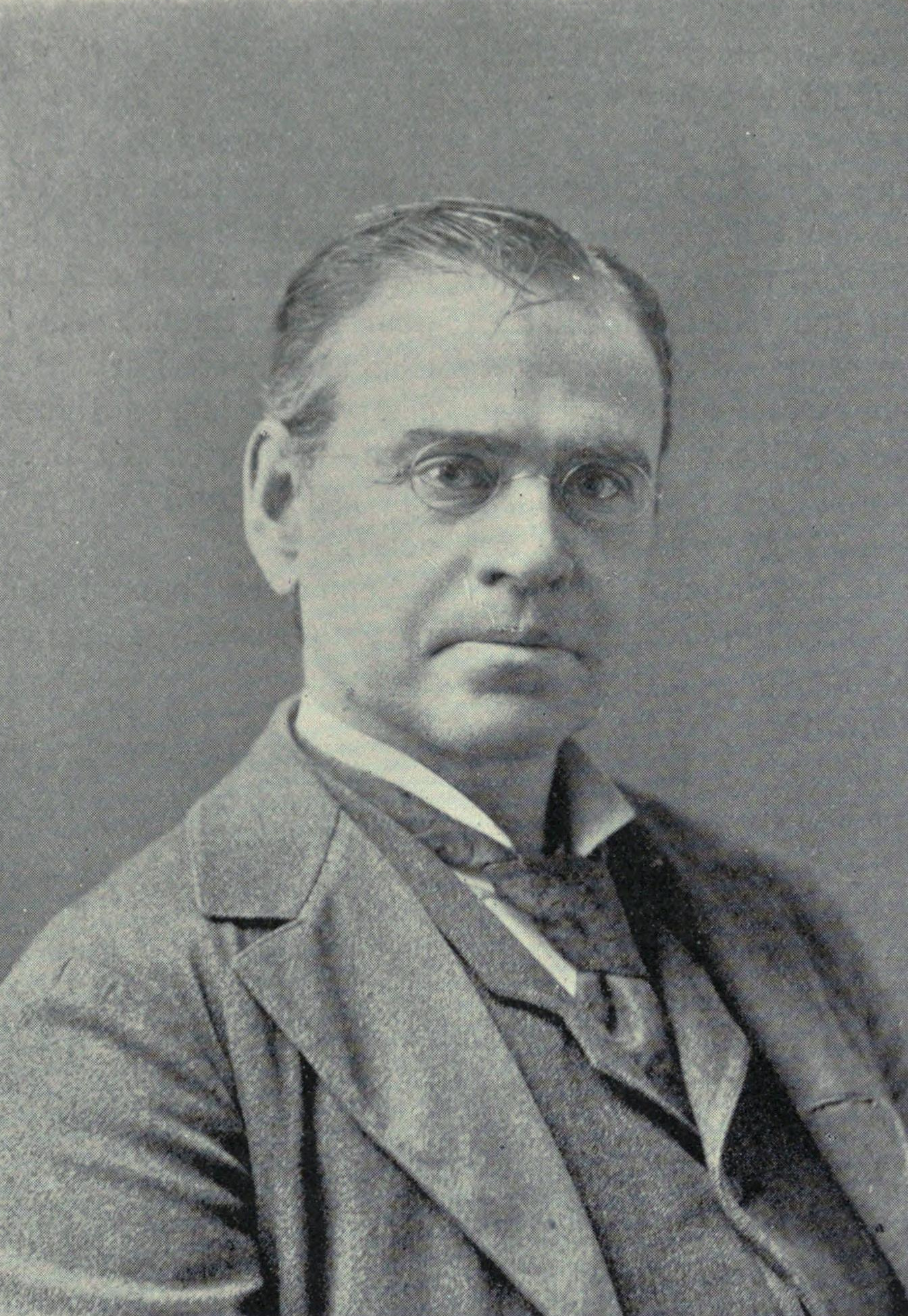
- Born: 17 July 1847; East Monmouth, Maine
- Died: 8 May 1933 (aged 85); San Rafael, California
- Known for: landscape, and marine painting
- Notable work: Panorama of Yosemite
- Movement: Hudson River School; En plein air
- Awards: 1902, Gold Medal, California State Agricultural Society exhibition
- Patrons: Rudolph Keppler, New York; George E. Lemon, Washington; John J. Tucker, New York; William Strange, New York; John H. Ricketson, Pittsburgh; T. F. Jeremiah, New York; Ludwig Ulmann, New York

Charles Dorman Robinson (alternate: Charles Dormon Robinson; nickname: C.D.) (July 17, 1847 - May 8, 1933) was an American panorama, cyclorama, landscape, and marine painter. He is known for his seascapes and landscapes of Northern California, including over a hundred paintings of Yosemite Valley. He was known as "the dean of Pacific Coast artists".

== Early years ==
Robinson was born in East Monmouth, Maine in 1847. He grew up in San Francisco after he moved with his family in 1850 at three years old. His father, the druggist Dr. David G. "Yankee" Robinson, established some of San Francisco's first theaters: The Dramatic Museum, in 1850; the Adelphi, in 1851; and the American in 1852. His mother was Mariette (née Dorman). Both of his parents' families were Colonialists; the Dormans were English army people and the Robinsons were Puritans.

While in San Francisco, Robinson attended Union Grammar School (1854–61) and received his first art lessons from Charles Christian Nahl. After his father disappeared, Robinson moved to Vermont with his mother where he attended North Troy Higher Academy (1861–64). In art, he was a student of William Bradford, 1862, Boston; George Inness, Boston, 1862-3; Mauritz de Haas and Régis François Gignoux, New York. He studied under Eugène Boudin for a year at the age of 19. He consulted with Samuel W. Griggs, Wallace Albert King, Jasper Francis Cropsey, Albert Bierstadt, and James Hamilton.

== Career ==
Early in his career, Robinson established his reputation as a professional painter after exhibiting marine paintings of the San Francisco Bay. In the 1860s and 1870s, he made painting trips through Central America and Mexico. By 1876, he had regular painting exhibits, the works influenced by the styles of Hudson River School and En plein air. His illustrations and writing were included in Overland Monthly and The Century Magazine. Robinson received art awards from the California State Agricultural Society in 1878; and he received the gold medal for best collection of paintings in the exhibit of 1902. He lost 30 years worth of his sketches and paintings in the 1906 San Francisco earthquake and fire.

Robinson was known for his seascapes and landscapes of Northern California. His paintings include, Ruins in Central America, 1870; Cyclorama of Yosemlte Valley, 56 feet (17 m) by 388 feet (118 m), 1894; Burning of San Francisco, 12 feet (3.7 m) by 30 feet (9.1 m), 1906; and Grand Canyon of Arizona, 11 feet (3.4 m) by 11 feet (3.4 m). In 1892, assisted by five other well-established artists, Robinson began what would be one of the largest pictures ever painted in California, the Panorama of Yosemite. One of his paintings hangs in Buckingham Palace, 67 of his paintings are in Great Britain; his paintings were presented to Queen Victoria and to King Prajadhipok of Siam. An untitled seascape and The Wet Sand are part of the collection at the Oakland Museum. Other collections of his work include the 1860 California Panorama at the Bancroft Library, while others are held by the Society of California Pioneers, Maritime Museum of San Francisco, Crocker Art Museum, the Bohemian Club, and the Nevada Museum of Art.

A 1921 home fire destroyed many of his California paintings. Robinson served as President of the Palette Club of San Francisco; and Dean of the Artists of California, since 1906. He was a member of the Bohemian Club and the San Francisco Art Association.

== Personal life ==
"It takes a crank to move the world, and I would rather be a crank than a nonentity." (C.D. Robinson, Yosemite)

—

He married Kathryn Evelyn Wright, cousin of Elmer E. Ellsworth, in 1874 in Ohio, and they moved to Alameda, California the next year. Since 1876 he made his home in San Rafael and had an office on Montgomery Street in San Francisco. Starting in 1880, Yosemite was his summer residence for the next 24 years; and he resided in Paris during the 1900 Exposition. He died at his San Rafael home in 1933. He had at least one child, a daughter, Lillian.

== Partial works ==
- (1878), Argonaut sketch book : [of the] Mechanics' Fair, August, 1878
- (1882), The Wawona hotel. An illustrated sketch of the sights and scenes around the Mariposa big trees station
