= Reggae Knights =

Studio album by Israel Vibration
- Released: August 16, 2011
- Genre: Reggae
- Length: 1:01:39
- Label: MEDIACOM/VPAL

Reggae Knights is a studio album by the Jamaican reggae harmony duo, Israel Vibration, released on August 16, 2011, under Mediacom/VPAL in the U.S. and in Europe on November 26, 2010, exclusively under Mediacom at first.

This album was recorded at Jimmy Cliff’s studio (Sun Power Productions) in Kingston. For the production, Israel Vibration worked with their faithful sound engineer Christopher Daley (who mixed in 2009 the Burning Spear Grammy Award album Jah Is Real), Dean Fraser and Steve Golding (Original Roots Radics) for the arrangements and respectively for the artistic direction of brass instruments and guitars. The vocalist Grub Cooper orchestrated choirs.

The musicians backing this album include original members of the Roots Radics (Flabba Holt, Dwight Pinkney), Robbie Shakespeare’s bass guitar on five tracks, a massive horn section (Nambo Robinson, Dean Fraser, Dwight Richards), the Black Soil Band (backing band for Tarrus Riley). The album comes is sold in a digipak with an extra 16-page booklet with the printed lyrics.

The album was nominated for the 2012 Grammy for Best New Reggae Album.

== Track listing ==
No.	Title	Length
1.	"My Master’s Will"	4:37
2.	"Dig Up The Ground"	4:27
3.	"Take It Slow"	4:53
4.	"If You Do Bad"	4:17
5.	"Haile-I"	4:21
6.	"Walla Walla"	4:24
7.	"New York City"	4:37
8.	"Poor And Humble"	4:19
9.	"Bad Intention"	3:51
10.	"Whole Town"	4:17
11.	"Rip And Run Off"	4:22
12.	"Cantankerous"	4:24
13.	"Slammer"	4:53
14.	"Original Gangster"	3:57
Total length:		1:01:39

== Chart positions ==
Chart (2010)	Peak position
French Albums (SNEP)	200
