= Israel Vibration =

Reggae harmony group from Jamaica

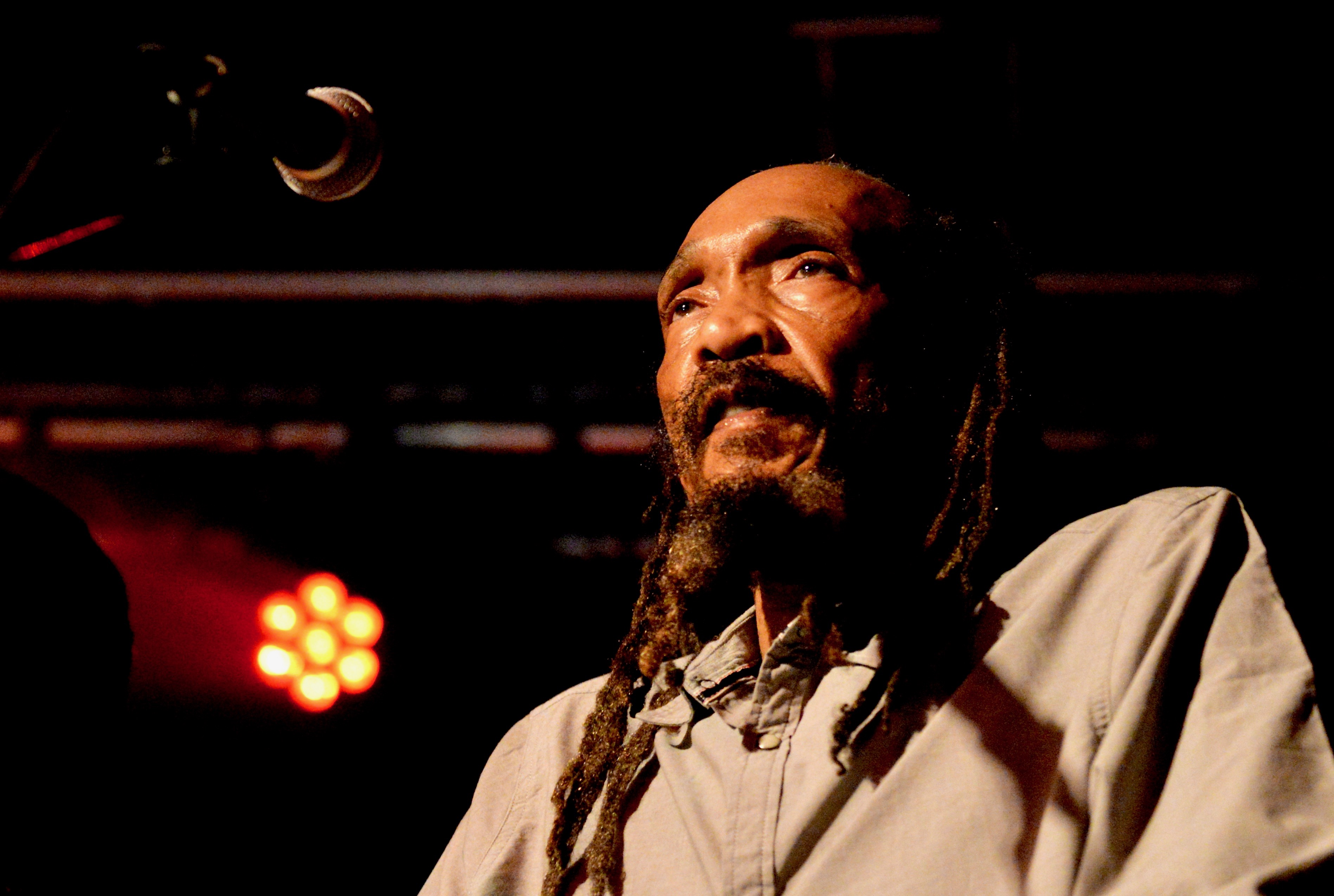
- Cecil 'Skelly' Spence in Antwerp 2018

Background information
- Origin: Kingston, Jamaica
- Genre: Roots reggae
- Years active: c.1970–present
- Labels: Harvest, RAS
- Members: Lascelle "Wiss" Bulgin
- Past members: Albert "Apple Gabriel" Craig; Cecil "Skeleton" Spence
- Website: http://realisraelvibration.com/

Israel Vibration are a reggae harmony group, originating from Kingston, Jamaica. Lascelle "Wiss" Bulgin, Albert "Apple Gabriel" Craig, and Cecil "Skelly" Spence all contracted childhood polio, and went on to be a Jamaican roots reggae group in the 1970s. The trio initially met as children at a rehabilitation center.

== History ==
Bulgin (born 1955), Craig (1955–2020), and Spence (1952–2022) first met as children at the Mona Rehabilitation Clinic, all polio patients in the epidemic that spread through Jamaica in the 1950s. Several years later they formed Israel Vibration. Craig attended the Alpha Boys School but ran away at the age of fourteen, living on the streets. Spence was a member of the band Hot Lickers, appearing on Jamaican television with the group at the age of twelve. He also played in the Jamaican wheelchair basketball team but was forced out in 1969 after adopting the Rastafarian faith, something which the three had in common when they were later reunited.

Spence and Craig got together in Kingston and sought out Bulgin, who at the time was working as a tailor. They formed a vocal group, initially adopting the name Israel Vibration Israel Vibrates, soon becoming simply Israel Vibration. They survived on money earned singing in the streets for several years, and in 1975 attempted to launch a recording career at Channel One Studios, but the track they recorded there ("Bad Intention") was not released.

Funding for their first album came in the form of a grant from the Twelve Tribes of Israel branch of Rastafarai after Hugh Booth, a member of the Twelve Tribes, had overheard the three men singing in a wooded area outside Kingston. Apple and Wiss were living in the area, which they had converted into a home. Recorded at the Treasure Isle studio in 1976, their debut release was the single "Why Worry", released on the Twelve Tribes label late that year. The single was successful enough for the group to be offered support slots at shows by artists such as Dennis Brown, Inner Circle, and Bob Marley.

They then began working with producer Tommy Cowan, releasing "The Same Song" (on which they were backed by members of Inner Circle) on his Top Ranking label in 1977, and an album of the same name followed in 1978. The album, and its dub counterpart, Israel Tafari (aka Same Song Dub) were a success internationally, leading to a deal with EMI label Harvest to reissue the album in the UK, the label also releasing a second album, Unconquered People in 1980.

For their third album, Why You So Craven (the title track aimed at their former producer Cowan), they worked with Henry "Junjo" Lawes but disagreements meant that they left the album unfinished, with Lawes getting The Tamlins to complete it.

The group relocated to New York in 1982 to seek professional health care, and escape the growing dancehall movement in Jamaica, but struggled to break through there and they split up. They each attempted to launch solo careers, with Bulgin releasing the Mr Sunshine album in 1985, but by 1987 they decided to relaunch Israel Vibration. Having all been turned down when they approached Gary "Dr. Dread" Himmelfarb, founder of RAS Records, during their solo period, they received a positive response when they approached him as a group. They were flown to Washington, D.C., to record a new album at the Lion and Fox Recording Studios in College Park, Maryland, backed by the Roots Radics. Strength of my Life was the group's fourth album. The band stayed with RAS into the 21st century, releasing more than a dozen albums for the label.

"Strength of My Life" (1988) remains their most successful album on the RAS label to date. Memorable tracks such as "Cool and Calm" and "Jah Love Me"—backed by the legendary Roots Radics—propelled the trio to immense international success. Their follow-up, "Praises" (1990), cemented their global popularity by riding the wave of the previous album's success. Subsequent releases "Forever" (1991) and "IV" (1993) saw a slight dip in the success achieved by their earlier works. Then came "On the Rock" (1995), which marked another major commercial peak in the 1990s; it featured the highly popular track "Rudeboy Shufflin'," the music video for which enjoyed heavy rotation on television, expanding their audience far beyond the niche of roots reggae purists. The subsequent "Free to Move" (1996) would be the last studio album recorded by Skelly, Wiss, and Apple together—that is, the original vocal trio. The magnificent "Live Again!" (1997) brings things full circle.

In 1997, Apple Gabriel left the group to pursue a solo career, releasing the album Another Moses in 1999. Skelly and Wiss continue to record albums and tour the world as Israel Vibration, backed by longtime associates Roots Radics. Their collaboration with RAS Records continued with two solid releases: “Pay the Piper” (1999) and “Jericho” (2000). The subsequent album, “Fighting Soldiers”, was produced in 2002 by the French label Nocturne and released on the US market the following year by RAS Records; the next two albums, “Stamina” (2007) and “Reggae Knights” (2010), were released on the Mediacom label. In December 2014 they were reportedly recording a new album set for release in early 2015. The new album, entitled "Play It Real" was released on 31 March 2015 via Utopia. On March 23, 2020, Albert "Apple Gabriel" co-founder and former member of the group died due to 'compilation sickness', earlier reports indicated that Albert was not well for quite some time, this was supposedly due to some of the polio infections left in his body. On a Facebook post on March 7, 2020, he had indicated that he had had a stroke. He died on March 23, 2020. On August 26, 2022, Cecil "Skelly" Spence died of lung cancer.

"Reggae Music Never Dies" is the new album—scheduled for release on February 28, 2025. The album features final recordings by the late Skelly, alongside new material from Lacelle "Wiss" Bulgin, the legendary trio's last surviving original member. The project began during the quiet of the pandemic, when Aston Barrett Jr. of The Wailers offered to produce a song for Wiss and Skelly. It was intended as a tribute to Israel Vibration's iconic 1979 album "Unconquered People", which had featured Wailers members—including his father, Aston "Family Man" Barrett. This sparked inspiration in Skelly and Wiss to revive the essence of "Unconquered People" by combining their vision with Aston Barrett Jr.'s expertise and the timeless sound of The Wailers. Barrett Jr. produced and mixed the album—with previews expected soon—and played bass, drums, and rhythm guitar, as well as keyboards and percussion. He enlisted top-tier talent to support the project, including Dwight Pinkney, Kubix, and Thales "Lion Farmer" on lead guitar; Dean Fraser on saxophone; Randy "Tromboclaat" Fletcher on trombone; Okiel McIntyre on trumpet; Carol Dexter on backing vocals; and percussionists Abidan Tafari and Kemoy "Chippy" Outar. Grammy-winning sound engineer Christopher Daley mastered the album.

Notably, Israel Vibration—represented by Wiss, touring Europe and USA with The Roots Radics in 2025 and 2026.

== Discography ==
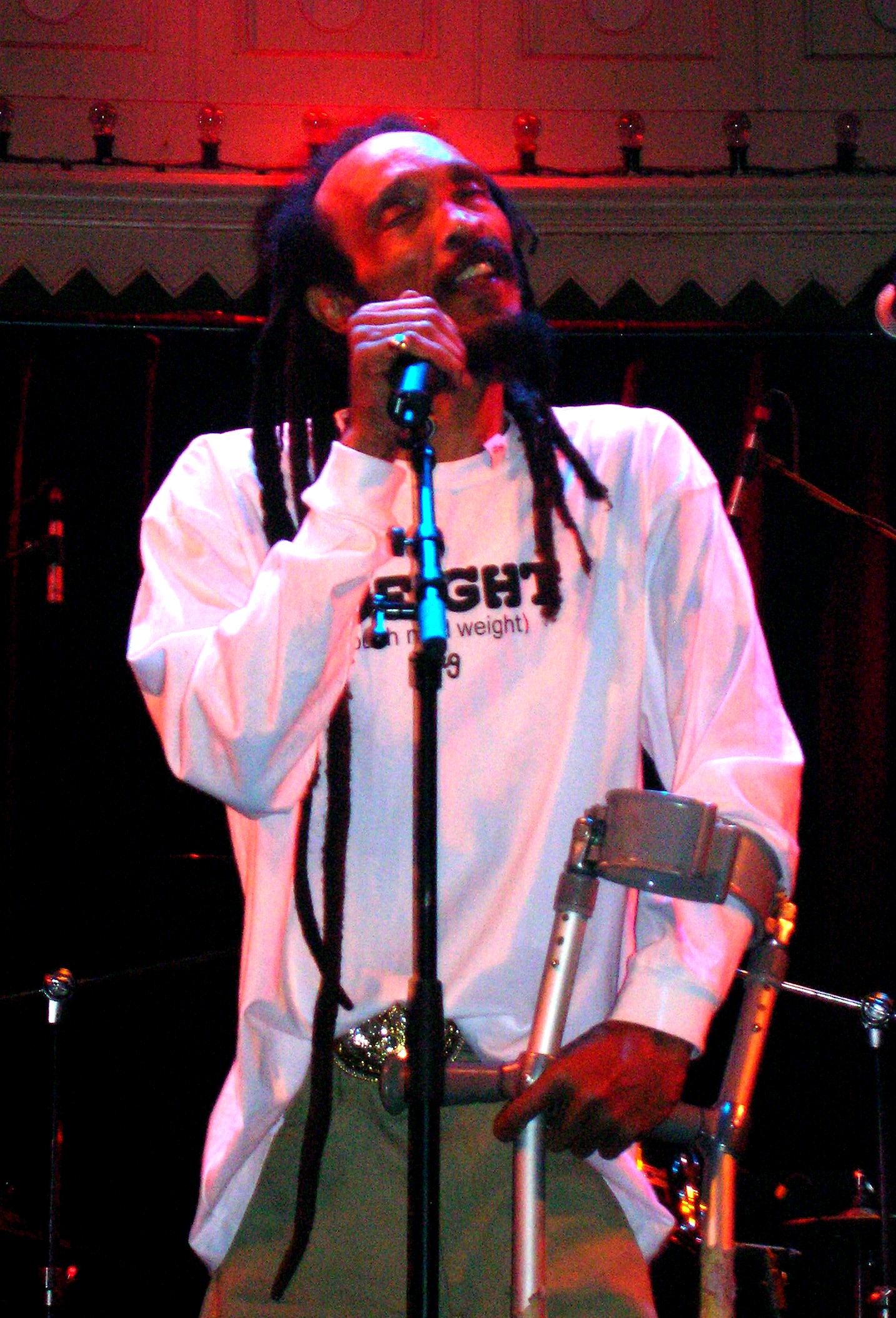
Skelly in 2006

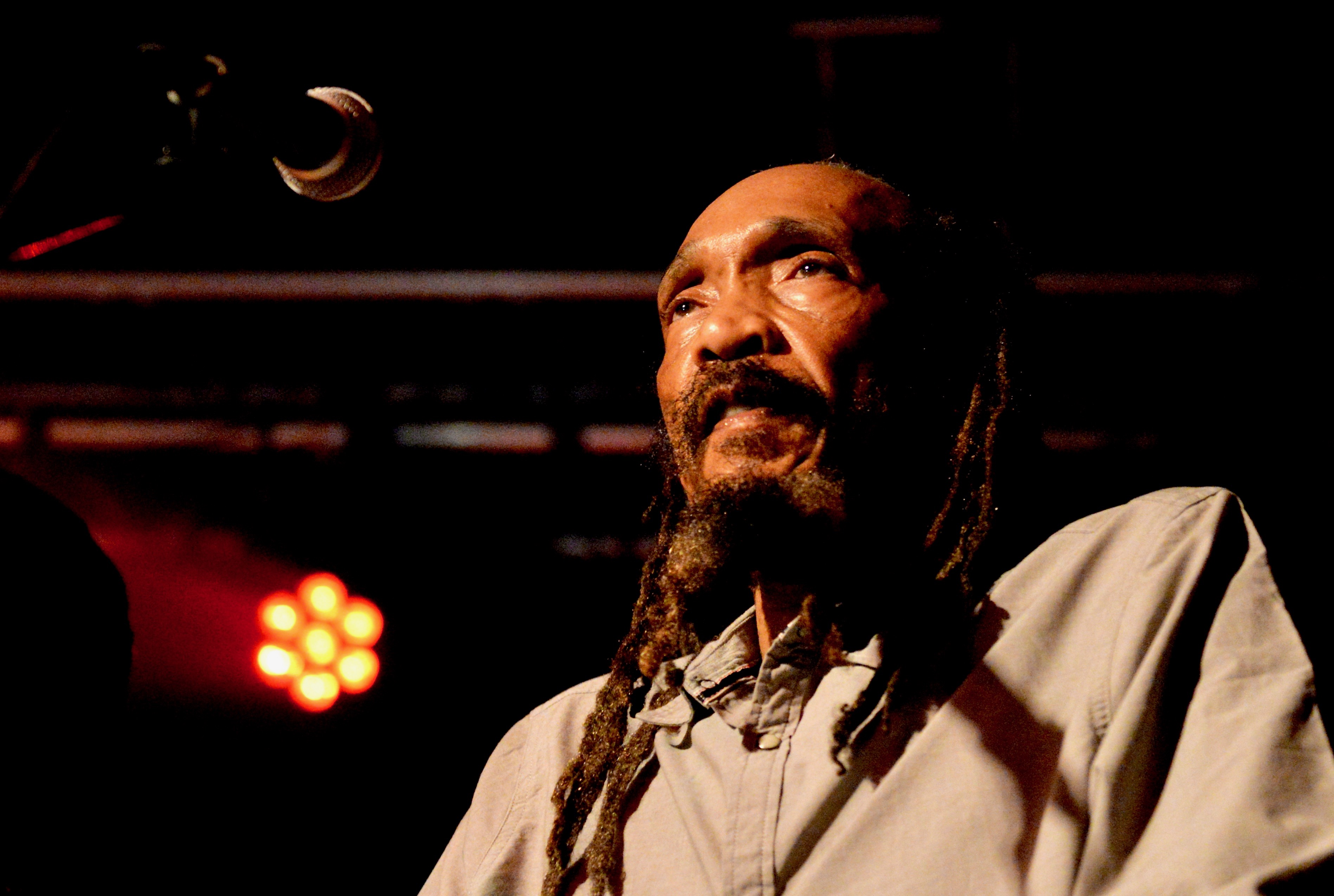
Skelly in 2018

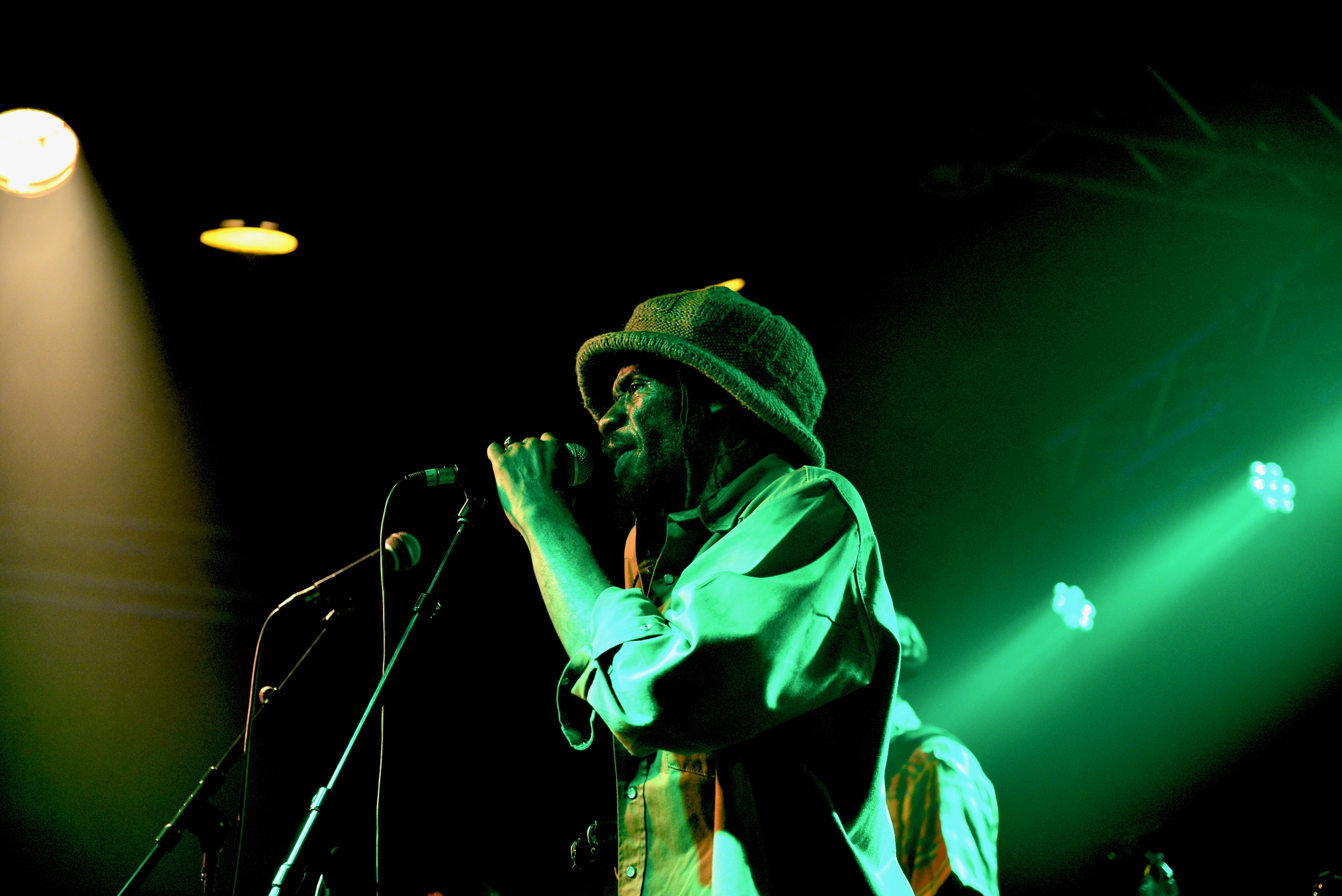
Wiss in 2018

=== Studio albums ===
- The Same Song (1978), Top Ranking
- Unconquered People (1979), Harvest
- Why You So Craven (1981), Volcano
- Strength of My Life (1988), RAS
- Praises (1990), RAS
- Dub Vibration: Israel Vibration in Dub (1990), RAS
- Forever (1991), RAS
- IV (1993), RAS
- I.V.D.U.B. (1994), RAS
- On the Rock (1995), RAS
- Dub the Rock (1995), RAS
- Israel Dub (1996), RAS
- Free to Move (1996), RAS
- Ras Portraits (1997), RAS
- Pay the Piper (1999), RAS
- Jericho (2000), RAS
- Power of the Trinity (2002)
- Dub Combo (2001), RAS
- Fighting Soldiers (2003)
- Cool and Calm (2005)
- Stamina (2007), Mediacom
- Reggae Knights (2010), Mediacom
- Play It Real (2015), Utopia
- Reggae Never Dies (2025)

=== Live albums ===
- Israel Vibration & The Gladiators Live at Reggae Sunsplash (1982)
- Vibes Alive (1992), RAS

Living truth (1999)

- Live Again! (1997), RAS
- Live & Jammin (2003), Nocturne
- Vibes of Zion (2024)
- Basco Sessions (2025)
