= Free to Move =

Free To Move

Studio album by Israel Vibration
- Released: 1996
- Genre: Reggae
- Length: 55:12
- Language: English
- Label: RAS Records
- Producer: Doctor Dread and Israel Vibration

Free to Move is a 1996 reggae album by the group Israel Vibration. The album spent three weeks on the Billboard Reggae Albums chart, peaking at #14 on September 14, 1996.

== Track listing ==
No.	Title	Writer(s)	Length
1.	"Terrorist"	Lascelle Bulgin
2.	"Mud Up"	Albert Craig
3.	"Travelling Man"	Cecil Spence
4.	""System Not Working""	Bulgin
5.	"Pretty Woman"	Craig
6.	"Livity In The Hood"	Spence
7.	"Saviour In Your Life"	Bulgin
8.	"Solomon Bloodline"	Craig
9.	"Feelin' Irie"	Spence
10.	"Another Day"	Bulgin
11.	"Life Is Real"	Craig
12.	"Mighty Negus"	Spence
