= Régis François Gignoux =

American painter

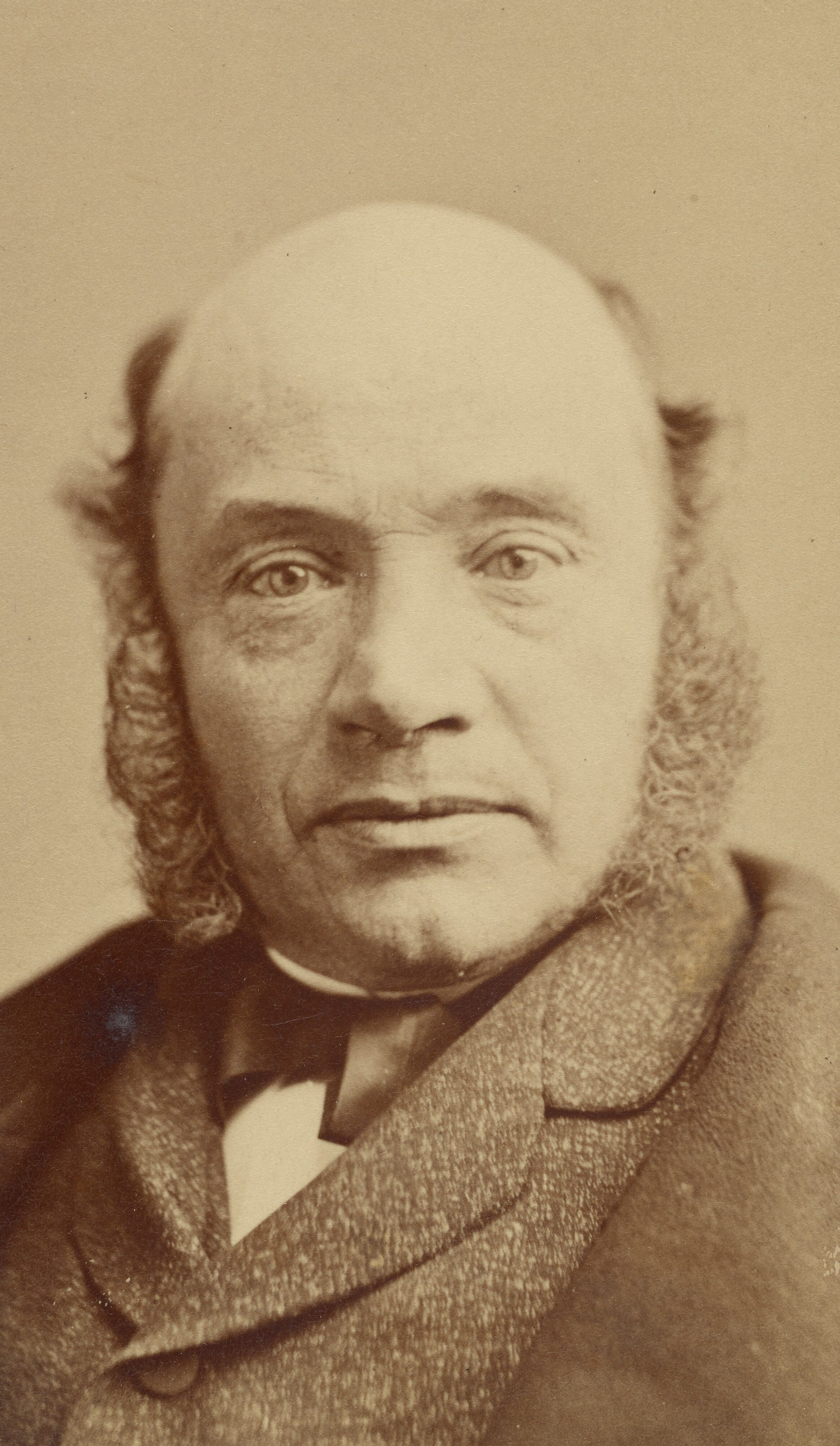
- Gignoux, c. 1870
- Born: June 16, 1814; Lyon, France
- Died: August 14, 1882 (aged 68); Paris, France
- Occupation: Painter

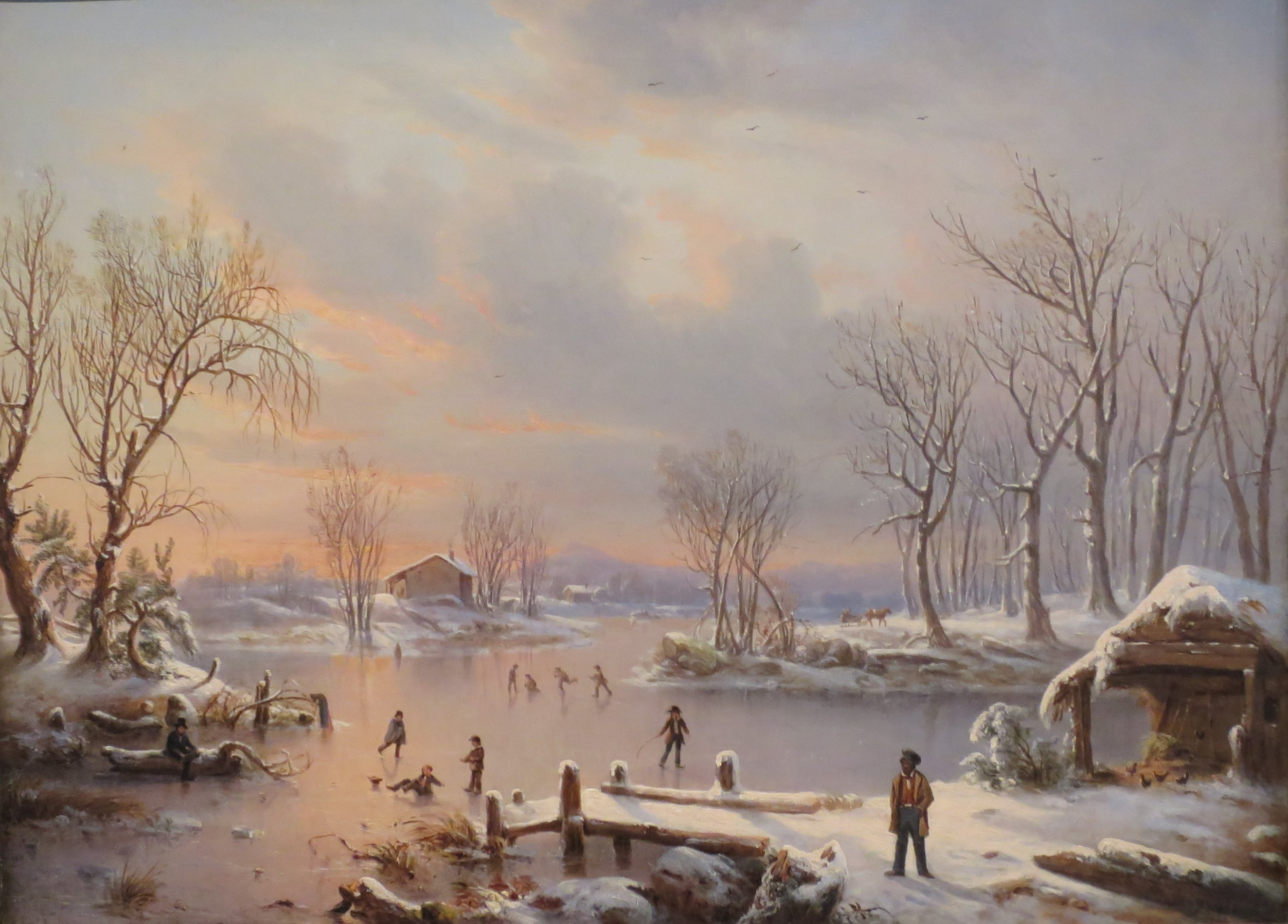
View Near Elizabethtown, N. J., oil painting by Régis François Gignoux, Honolulu Museum of Art

Régis François Gignoux (16 June 1816 in Lyon – 14 April 1882 in Paris) was a French painter who was active in the United States from 1840 to 1870. (Aliases: Marie-François-Régis Gignoux; Régis Francois Gignoux; Régis François Gignoux; Régis-François Gignoux)

== Biography ==
He was born in Lyon, France in 1816, and studied at the École des Beaux-Arts under the French historical painter Hippolyte Delaroche, who inspired Gignoux to turn his talents toward landscape painting. Gignoux emigrated to the United States from France in 1840 to follow his brother and to marry an American woman, eventually opening a studio in Brooklyn, New York. He was a member of the National Academy of Design, and was the first president of the Brooklyn Art Academy. George Inness, John LaFarge (1835–1910), and Charles Dormon Robinson were his students. By 1844, Gignoux had opened a studio in New York City and became one of the first artists to join the famous Tenth Street Studio, where other members included Albert Bierstadt, Frederic Church, Jasper Francis Cropsey, and John Frederick Kensett. He returned to France in 1870 and died in Paris in 1882.

Gignoux is best known for his meticulous renderings of Northeast American landscapes, and was the only member of the Hudson River School to specialize in snow scenes. The Brooklyn Museum, the Corcoran Gallery of Art (Washington, DC), the Georgia Museum of Art (University of Georgia, Athens), the High Museum of Art (Atlanta, Georgia), the Honolulu Museum of Art, the Hood Museum of Art (Dartmouth College, Hanover, New Hampshire), the Museum of Art at Brigham Young University (Provo, Utah), the Museum of Fine Arts, Boston, the Nelson-Atkins Museum of Art (Kansas City, Missouri), the New York Historical Society (New York City), the Parrish Art Museum (Southampton, New York), the Smith College Museum of Art (Northampton, Massachusetts), the United States Capitol Art Collection (Washington, D. C.), the Walters Art Museum (Baltimore, Maryland), the Frances Young Tang Teaching Museum and Art Gallery at Skidmore College (Saratoga Springs, New York), and the Watson Gallery ( Wheaton College, Norton, Massachusetts) are among the public collections holding work by Régis François Gignoux.

"A dramatic, newly restored 1843 painting of the interior of Mammoth Cave by Marie-Francois-Regis Gignoux has been restored as part of the conservation program for the Henry Luce III Center for the Study of American Culture at the New-York Historical Society opening in November [2000]. ...In his dramatically lit interior view of Mammoth Cave, Gignoux looks from deep in the cave across the so-called "Rotunda" toward the entrance, which is illuminated by an almost mystical light from the outside. From the War of 1812 onward nitre (lime nitrate) used in making saltpeter, one of the essential elements for gunpowder, was mined and prepared from bat guano in the Rotunda. ..." Currently, Mammoth Cave is touring as part of The Hudson River School: Nature and the American Vision organized by the New-York Historical Society.

== Gallery ==
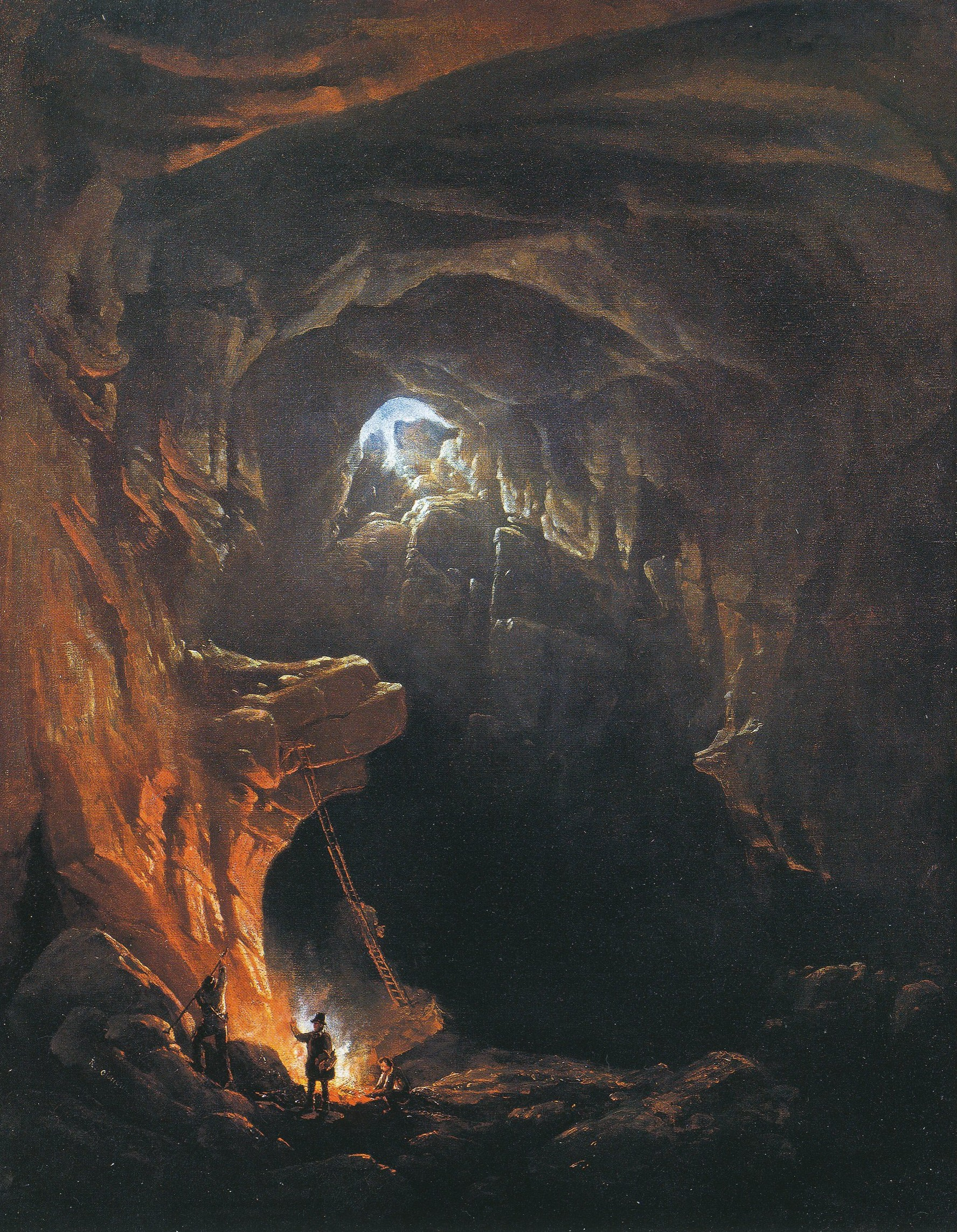
Mammoth Cave in Kentucky, 1843

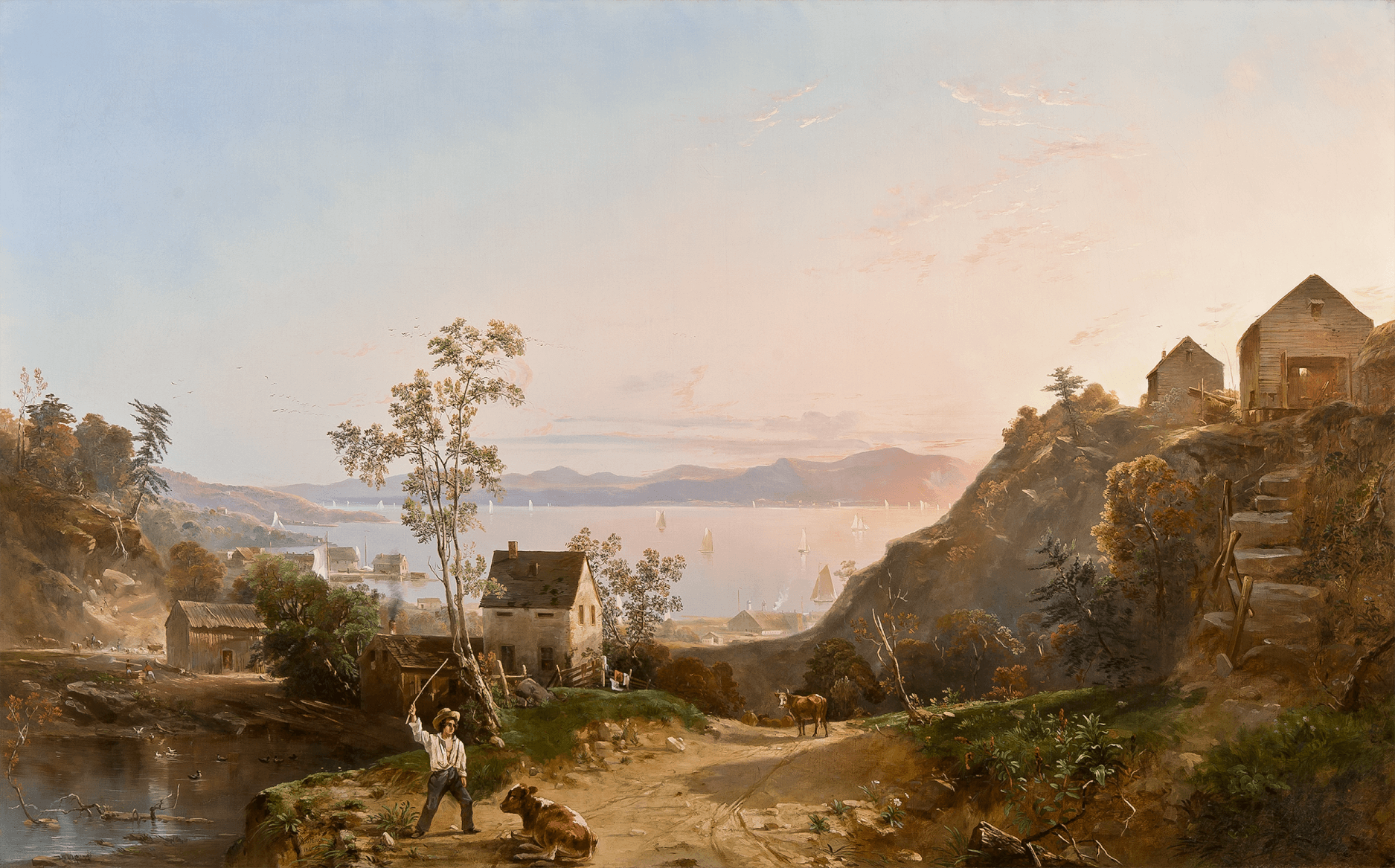
View Of Peekskill, oil on canvas, dated 1846

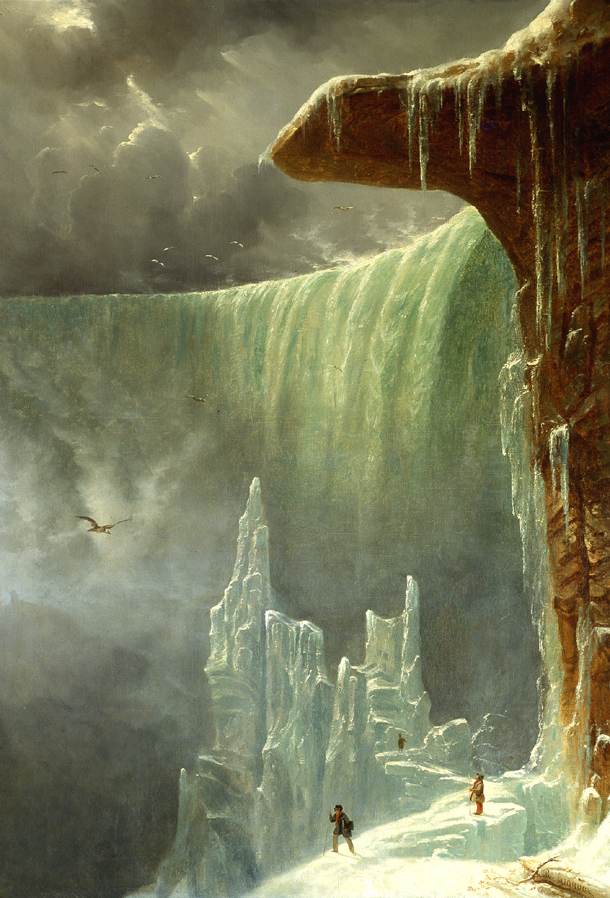
Niagara, The Table Rock in Winter, oil on canvas, ca. 1847, United States Senate

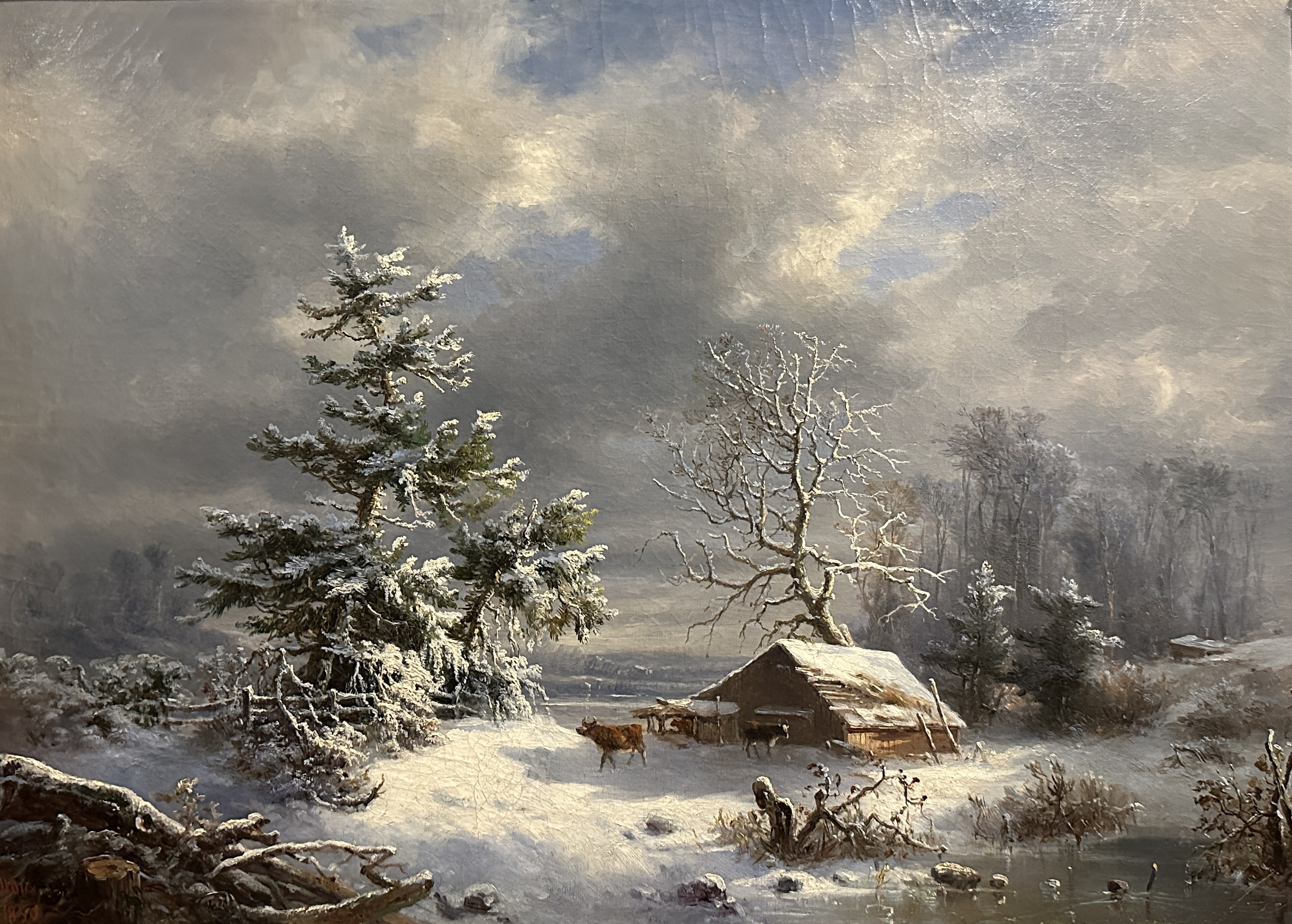
Winter Scene (1850), Washington County Museum of Fine Arts

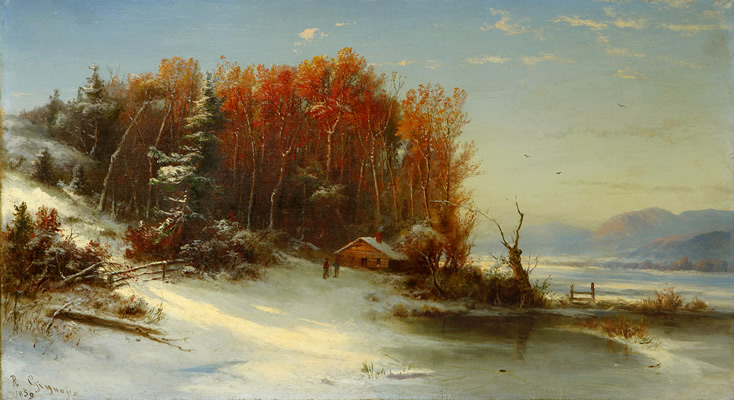
First Snow Along the Hudson River, 1859
