= On the Rock (Israel Vibration album) =

Studio album by Israel Vibration
- Released: 1995
- Genre: Roots reggae
- Label: RAS
- Producer: Israel Vibration, Doctor Dread

Israel Vibration chronology
I.V.D.U.B. (1994)	On the Rock (1995)	Dub the Rock (1995)

On the Rock is an album by the Jamaican vocal trio Israel Vibration, released in 1995. It was nominated for a National Association of Independent Record Distributors Award. The trio promoted the album with a North American tour. "Sugar Me" and "Rudeboy Shufflin" were released as singles.

A dub version of the album, Dub the Rock, was released.

== Production ==
The album was produced by the trio and Doctor Dread. The three members each wrote four songs. The Roots Radics Band backed Israel Vibration. The title track is about the increase in the number of younger people sent to prison. "Love Is All You Need" interprets the Beatles song. Polio survivors, the trio display their mobility aids on the album cover.

== Critical reception ==
Professional ratings
Review scores
Source	Rating
AllMusic	4/5 stars

The St. Louis Post-Dispatch deemed On the Rock "another uncompromising and exceptional disc of modern roots reggae." The Gazette determined that the album "not only conjures up the conscious Marley vibe, it is a thing of beauty against great odds."

The Times Colonist concluded that, "like Marley, Israel Vibration are sweet prophets of doom and transcendence, and On the Rock is a reminder of reggae's powers to challenge, transform and inspire." The Boston Globe opined: "An outstanding disc, it consciously echoes a Bob Marley vibe as snatches of his lyrics rise up from within the deep reggae grooves."

AllMusic called the album "music with soul, thought provoking and totally satisfying."

== Track listing ==
No.	Title	Length
1.	"Mr. Consular Man"
2.	"Ambush"
3.	"Rebel for Real"
4.	"Find Something to Do"
5.	"Love Makes a Good Man"
6.	"Brother's Keeper"
7.	"Struggling Youth"
8.	"Rudeboy Shufflin"
9.	"Love Is All You Need"
10.	"Borderline"
11.	"Sugar Me"
12.	"On the Rock"
