= On the Rocks (British TV series) =

1969 British TV comedy series

- Genre: Sitcom
- Country of origin: United Kingdom
- Original language: English
- No. of series: 1
- No. of episodes: 8

Production
- Running time: 30 minutes

Original release
- Network: ITV
- Release: 8 July – 26 August 1969

On the Rocks is a British television comedy that aired in 1969. Produced by Tyne Tees Television, it was about a fictional television station.

All eight episodes are believed to be lost.
