= David Robinson (artist) =

- Born: November 10, 1964 (age 61)
- Website: www.robinsonstudio.com

David Robinson (born 1964) is a Canadian artist specializing in figurative sculpture. He is best known for dynamic compositions that situate his figures in abstract formal environments.

== Early life and education ==
Born in Toronto, David Robinson entered the Fine Arts stream in high school specializing in sculpture. He continued his studies at Langara College and became an Honours Graduate in the Sculpture Program at the Ontario College of Art and Design.

== Artistic practice ==
Robinson's work is an example of contemporary humanist realism that draws on conceptual and metaphysical themes.

Robinson's figures reference classical traditions, but often invert or subvert traditional dynamics.

His early works stirred controversy by combining nudity with Christian themes and imagery. Robinson's sculptures incorporate a variety of materials ranging from bronze, steel and silver to concrete, mirror and paper. Robinson's works range from small unique and editioned works to large-scale monumental sculpture. Examples of large works are those commissioned by parties such as the Regional Municipality of Wood Buffalo, Polygon Homes, the Four Seasons Hotel Resort in Whistler, the Fort McMurray Airport Authority, Century Group, the Rosewood Hotel Georgia, and Trent University.

== Notable works ==
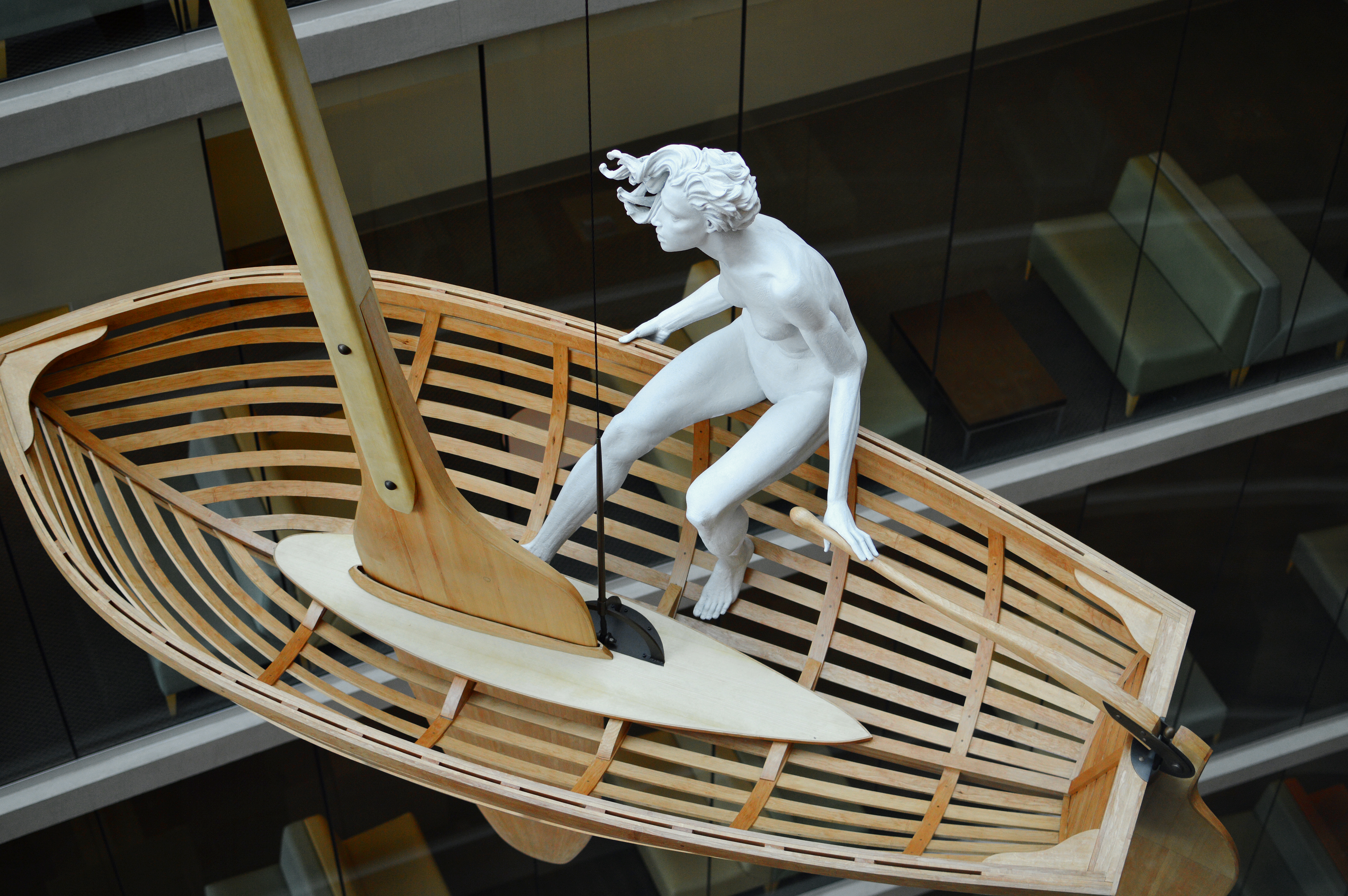
Windward Calm by David Robinson at the Gordon and Leslie Diamond Healthcare Centre.

=== Windward Calm ===
Windward Calm is a kinetic suspended sculpture installed at the Gordon and Leslie Diamond Centre at Vancouver General Hospital in 2018. Robinson was inspired to create the piece while spending time at VGH recovering from a cardiac valve repair. The sculpture hangs from a custom winching system and travels vertically through the 7-storey glass atrium, while rotating in the air currents. The sculpture is the subject of a documentary short film titled "A Windward Calm".

=== Reflections on the River ===
Reflections on the River was commissioned by the Regional Municipality of Wood Buffalo. The municipality engaged in intensive public consultation for both art selection and siting.
