= David K. Robinson =

David Kent Robinson (born 1954) is an American professor of European history, emeritus, and the past department chair at Truman State University. He is the past president of the Missouri Conference of American Association of University Professors.

== Early life ==
Robinson was born in 1954 on a farm in southern Indiana. After completing his schooling, he attended Harvard College intending to complete a degree in chemistry. Instead his interests turned towards history of general science.

== Education and career ==
Robinson received his A.B., magna cum laude, in History and Science from Harvard College in 1976. He then went on to receive his M.A. in History from the University of California, Berkeley in 1980. Robinson received his Ph.D. in History from the University of California, Berkeley in 1987, with a dissertation entitled "Wilhelm Wundt and the Establishment of Experimental Psychology". He teaches a wide range of courses at Truman State University, including: World Civilizations I and II, Introduction to History and Historiography, Topics: European Social History Since 1700, Topics: Darwinism (in Europe and America), Modern Germany, and Modern European Diplomatic History.

== Books and articles ==
Robinson has published numerous academic and scholarly works.

Those published works include:

- After the Fulbright: Continuing Work in Ukraine Fulbright-Ukraine
- Rieber, R. W., & Robinson, D. K. (Eds.). (2013). The essential Vygotsky. Springer Science & Business Media.
