= Fences in Ming China =

A fence or receiver (Chinese: 銷贓者) was a merchant who bought and sold stolen goods. Fences were part of the extensive network of accomplices in the criminal underground of the Ming and Qing dynasties of China. Their occupation entailed criminal activity, but as fences often acted as liaisons between the more respectable community to the underground criminals, they were seen as living a "precarious existence on the fringes of respectable society".

A fence worked alongside bandits, but in a different line of work. The network of criminal accomplices that was often acquired was essential to ensuring both the safety and the success of fences.

== Fencing as an occupation ==
=== Entering the occupation ===
The path into the occupation of a fence stemmed, in a large degree, from necessity. As most fences came from the ranks of poorer people, they often took whatever work they could - both legal and illegal.

Like most bandits operated within their own community, fences also worked within their own town or village. For example, in some satellite areas of the capital, military troops lived within or close to the commoner population and they had the opportunity to hold illegal trades with commoners.

In areas like Baoding and Hejian, local peasants and community members not only purchased military livestock such as horses and cattle, but also helped to hide the "stolen livestock from military allured by the profits". Local peasants and community members became fences and they hid criminal activities from officials in exchange of products or money from these soldiers.

=== Fencing as a "side business" ===
Most fences were not individuals who only bought and sold stolen goods to make a living. The majority of fences had other occupations within the "polite" society and held a variety of official occupations. These occupations included laborers, coolies, and peddlers. Such individuals often encountered criminals in markets in their line of work, and, recognizing a potential avenue for an extra source of income, formed acquaintances and temporary associations for mutual aid and protection with criminals. In one example, an owner of a teahouse overheard the conversation between Deng Yawen, a criminal, and others planning a robbery and he offered to help to sell the loot for an exchange of spoils.

At times, the robbers themselves filled the role of fences, selling to people they met on the road. This may actually have been preferable for robbers, in certain circumstances, because they would not have to pay the fence a portion of the spoils.

Butchers were also prime receivers for stolen animals because of the simple fact that owners could no longer recognize their livestock once butchers slaughtered them. Animals were very valuable commodities within Ming China, and a robber could potentially sustain a living from stealing livestock and selling them to butcher-fences.

== Types of stolen goods ==
=== Information as a good ===
Although the vast majority of the time, fences worked with physical stolen property, fences who also worked as itinerant barbers also sold information as a good. Itinerant barbers often amassed important sources of information and news as they traveled, and sold significant pieces of information, often to criminals in search of places to hide or individuals to rob. In this way, itinerant barbers also served the role as a keeper of information that could be sold to both members of the criminal underground, as well as powerful clients in performing the function of a spy.

=== Human trafficking ===
Fences not only sold items such as jewelry and clothing but were also involved in human trafficking of hostages that bandits kidnapped. Women and children were the easiest and among the most common "objects" the fences sold. Most female hostages were sold to fences and then sold as prostitutes, wives, or concubines. One example of human trafficking was when Chen Akuei's gang abducted a servant girl and sold her to Lin Baimao, who in turn sold her for thirty pieces of silver as a wife. In contrast to women, who required beauty to sell for a high price, children were sold regardless of their physical appearance or family background. Children were often sold as servants or entertainers, while young girls were often sold as prostitutes.

== Network of connections ==
Similarly to merchants of honest trade, one of the most significant tools of a fence was their network of connections. As they were the middlemen between robbers and clients, fences needed to form and maintain connections in both the "polite" society, as well as among criminals. However, there were a few exceptions in which members of the so-called "well-respected" society become receivers and harbourers. They not only help bandits to sell the stolen goods but also acted as agents of bandits to collect protection money from local merchants and residents. These "part-time" fences with high social status used their connection with bandits to help themselves gain social capital as well as wealth.

=== Relationships with clients ===
It was extremely important to their occupation that fences maintained a positive relationship with their customers, especially their richer gentry clients. When some members of the local elites joined the ranks of fences, they not only protect bandits to protect their business interests, they actively took down any potential threats to their illegal profiting, even government officials. In the Zhejiang Province, the local elites not only got the provincial commissioner, Zhu Wan, dismissed from his office but also eventually "[drove] him to suicide". This was possible because fences often had legal means of making a living, as well as illegal activities and could threaten to turn in bandits into the authorities.

=== Relationship with bandits ===
It was also essential for them to maintain a relationship with bandits. However, it was just as true that bandits needed fences to make a living. As a result, fences often held dominance in their relationship with bandits. Taking advantage of their dominance in their relationships with bandits, fences also cheated bandits by manipulating the prices they paid bandits for the stolen property.

=== Safehouses ===
Aside from simply buying and selling stolen goods, fences often played additional roles in the criminal underground of early China. Because of the high floating population in public places such as inns and teahouses, they often became ideal places for banditries and gangs to gather to exchange information and plan for their next crime. Harborers, people who provided safehouses for criminals, often played the role of receiving stolen goods from their harbored criminals to sell to other customers. Safehouses included inns, teahouses, brothels, opium dens, as well as gambling parlors, and employees or owners of such institutions often functioned as harborers, as well as fences. These safehouses locate in places where there are high floating population and people from all kinds of social backgrounds.

==== Brothels ====
Brothels themselves helped these bandits to hide and sell stolen goods because of the special Ming Law that exempted brothels from being held responsible "for the criminal actions of their clients". Even though government requires owners of these places to report any suspicious activities, lack of enforcement from government itself and some of the owners being fences for the bandits make an ideal safehouse for bandits and gangs.

==== Pawnshops ====
Pawnshops were also often affiliated with fencing stolen goods. The owners or employees of such shops often paid cash for stolen goods at a price a great deal below market value to bandits, that were often desperate for money, and resold the goods to earn a profit.

== Punishment of fences ==
Two different Ming Laws, the Da Ming Lü 大明律 and the Da Gao 大诰, drafted by the Hongwu Emperor Zhu Yuanzhang, sentenced fences with different penalties based on the categories and prices of the products that were stolen.

=== Foreign trade ===
In coastal regions, illegal trading with foreigners, as well as smuggling became a huge concern for the government during the mid to late Ming era. In order to prohibit this crime, the government passed a law in which illegal smugglers who traded with foreigners without the consent of the government would be punished with exile to the border for military service.

=== Military property ===
In areas where military troops were stationed, stealing and selling military property would result in a more severe punishment. In the Jiaqing time, a case was recorded of stealing and selling military horses. The empire himself gave direction that the thieves who stole the horses and the people who helped to sell the horses would be put on cangue and sent to labor in a border military camp.

=== Salt ===
In the salt mines, the penalty for workers who stole salt and people who sold the stolen salt was the most severe. Consider salt is a very valuable property in Ming China, anyone who was arrested and found guilty of stealing and selling government salt was put to death.
