= David G. Robinson (theatre pioneer) =

David G. Robinson (nicknames: "Doc"; "Yankee"), an American druggist by training, was an early theatrical pioneer in Northern California. Along with others, he established the San Francisco-Sacramento-Placerville entertainment circuit of the day; as well as some of San Francisco's first theaters.

He was married to Mariette (née Dorman). Both families were Colonialists; the Dormans were English army people and the Robinsons were Puritans. Great-grandfather Robinson served in Edward Braddock's ill-fated army. Their son, the artist Charles Dorman Robinson, was born in East Monmouth, Maine in 1847, and soon after, the family moved to Newport, Vermont.

Robinson left for California without his family in 1848. Robinson and a partner opened the 280 seat Dramatic Museum in San Francisco in 1850; and his wife and son arrived in the same year. When the Dramatic Museum burned down, he built the 2,000 seat American Theater, considered to be one of the first real theaters in the city. In 1851, a citizen's committee gave Robinson $50,000 to build the Adelphi Theater. Robinson was also a partner in backing the Bryant Minstrels. Robinson and a partner staged opera, minstrel, and burlesque productions, the first being a farce written by Robinson, Seeing the Elephant. Robinson also did "Yankee" impersonations, gaining the nickname "Yankee" Robinson. He was a stage personality who entertained along the old Barbary Coast, setting the tone for the first generation of California popular music. He was the first of the great professional entertainers after the California Gold Rush, was one of San Francisco's first Board of Aldermen, and was a member of the city's Vigilance Committee, 1851-56. In 1857, he left California, appeared in Mobile, Alabama, and then vanished.
