= David Robinson (photographer) =

British photographer, artist, and author (born 1973)

David Robinson (born 31 December 1973) is a British photographer, artist, and author. Preoccupied with the landscape of leisure he is best known as the creator of Golfers (2000), Wonderland (2003), and Lee Valley Leisure (2005).

== Biography ==
Robinson was born in Enniskillen, Northern Ireland. He attended Enniskillen High School and Portora Royal School.

Preoccupied with the landscape of leisure he is best known as the creator of Golfers (2000), Wonderland (2003), and Lee Valley Leisure (2005). He has worked commercially throughout his career, creating images for Penguin books, Polydor, EMI, Sony, Adobe, Pfizer, and editorially, working for The Guardian, The Independent and The Daily Telegraph. Robinson was commissioned by Penguin to photograph the dub-reggae poet Linton Kwesi Johnson for the cover of his 2001 modern classics book Mi Revalueshanary Fren. Robinson has also created images of The Divine Comedy for their album Regeneration and for recent releases by Guillemots.

In 2007, he featured in the BBC 4 series Britain in Pictures in which he was filmed whilst photographing ballrooms and other inspirational buildings in the province where he grew up.

In 2012, Robinson created a children's book titled The Mushroom Picker, using an experimental 'luminogram' process that produces "beautifully intricate, playful and at times surreal" images which "evoke other worlds, full of magic, menace and a mischievous sense of humour."

Robinson's images have been exhibited widely in the UK and beyond, and featured in the US touring show Picturing Eden, initiated by George Eastman House in Rochester, curated by Deborah Klochko. A book of the exhibition is published by Steidl.

In 2014, Robinson collaborated with Gorilla Perfume / Lush, creating a Luminogram to help promote 'Mycelium', one of their newly released fragrances. He also featured on The Food Programme – BBC Radio 4 discussing his artistic practice and Sporeboys, the Street food kitchen that he co-founded in 2005.

Penny Bun Helps Save the World (2018), published by GOST is the sequel to The Mushroom Picker and employs the same visual style. An illustrated book for all ages, it tells the story of a gang of mushrooms and their attempt to save the forest. The protagonist of the fungi tale is Penny Bun, whose forest home is under threat from developers who wish to destroy the fragile ecosystem that supports mushroom, plant and human life. The story is told through analogue luminograms which Robinson creates by placing on photographic paper on the plate of an enlarger and exposed to different light intensities. Each exposure produces a unique print, shaped the interplay of light, colour and texture of the mushrooms.

== Publications ==
- Golfers. Glass, 2000. ISBN 0-9539587-0-1.
- Wonderland. GenerationYacht, 2003. ISBN 0-9545969-0-0.
- Lee Valley Leisure. GenerationYacht, 2005. ISBN 0-9545969-1-9.
- The Extreme Golf Handbook. Barrons, 2005.
- Picturing Eden. Göttingen: Steidl, 2006. OCLC 607780029. With an introduction by Anthony Bannon and an essay by Deborah Klochko.
- The Mushroom Picker: Penny Buns Great Escape. Violette Editions, 2012. ISBN 978-1-900828-41-3.
- Penny Bun Helps Save the World. GOST, 2018 ISBN 978-1-910401-24-8.

== Exhibitions ==
- Wonderland, Photofusion, London, 2003; Ormeau Baths Gallery, Belfast, N.Ireland, 2003
- Computer Portraits, Old Museum Arts Centre, Belfast, N.Ireland, 2003
- Golfscapes, Clotworthy Arts Centre, Antrim, N.Ireland, 2003
- Fantastic Realism, Tallinn Art Hall, Estonia, 2004
- Picturing Eden, Museum of Photographic Arts, San Diego, 2008
- An Unusual Garden, Houston Center for Photography, Houston, TX, 2013
- UnNatural History, Herbert Art Gallery & Museum, Coventry, UK, 2021
