= Love on the Rocks =

Love on the Rocks may refer to:

- "Love on the Rocks" (song), a 1980 song by Neil Diamond, from The Jazz Singer soundtrack
- "Love on the Rocks", a song by Sara Bareilles from her 2007 album Little Voice
- "Love on the Rocks with No Ice", a song by The Darkness from Permission to Land
- "Love on the Rocks", a song by Poison from their 1988 album Open Up and Say... Ahh!
- Love on the Rocks (film), a 2004 film starring Louis Koo
- Love on the Rocks (album), a 1963 Julie London album
- "Love on the Rocks" (Doctors), a 2003 television episode
- "Love on the Rocks", a season seven episode of the television series Full House
- "Love on the Rocks", a season five episode of the TV series Hercules: The Legendary Journeys
