= David Robinson (English cricketer) =

English cricketer (born 1938)

David Robinson (born 1 September 1938) was an English cricketer. He was a right-handed batsman and wicket-keeper who played for Dorset. He was born in Alfreton, Derbyshire.

Robinson made two Minor Counties Championship appearances, one each in the 1969 and 1970 seasons. His sole List A match came in the 1973 Gillette Cup, against Staffordshire. From the lower-middle order, Robinson scored two runs in the Dorset innings, as they lost the first-round match.
