= David M. Robinson =

American historian (born 1965)

David M. Robinson (born May 27, 1965) is an American historian. He earned a bachelor's degree from Hobart College and completed graduate studies at Princeton University. He teaches at Colgate University as the Robert H.N. Ho Professor in Asian Studies.
