= David Robinson (reggae singer) =

David Robinson is a Jamaican reggae singer who first recorded in Jamaica in the late 1970s. He also recorded as Dave and The Diamonds such as "Chagga Chagga Warrior" (1978). His "Chant to Jah" was arranged and produced by Dennis Brown. In later years he moved to Milwaukee, Wisconsin.

== Discography ==
- A: I Bet You Dont Know B Skin, Flesh, And Bones Version Tit For Tat Records Jamaica 1975
- A: Native Woman B: Dub Version Crystal Records Jamaica 1975
- A: Jah Know The Rebels B: Gordon Road Rock Ja-Man Records Jamaica 1977
- A: Moving Away B: Mozambique Bad Gong Records Jamaica 1977
- A: Rain Bow B: Rain Style Bad Gong 1978
- A: Pay The Price B: Version Bad Gong 1978
- Dave And The Diamonds A: Chagga Chagga Warrior B: Dub Version Love Records 1978
- A: Cool Runnings B: Version Bad Gong 1978
- A: Ruby And Diamonds Errol Holt B: Version 1979
- A: On The Rocks B: Rodigan Rock 1981
- A: Celebrate B: Celebration Jaguar Records Jamaica 1982
- A: Black Man Dance [no artist listed] B: Version
