= Xu Jie =

Chinese official (1503–1583)

- 徐階
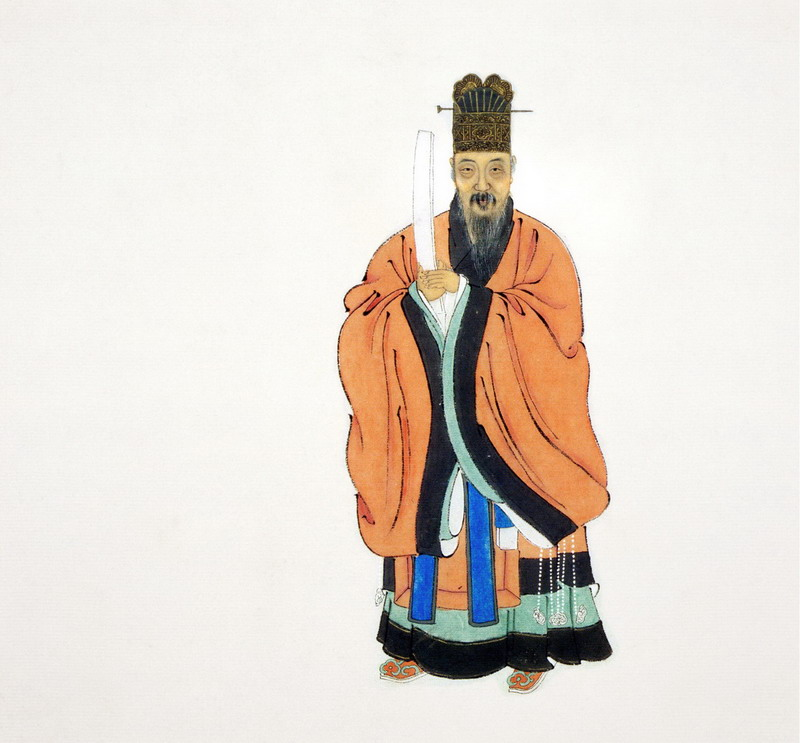

Senior Grand Secretary
- In office 1562–1568
- Monarchs: Jiajing; Longqing
- Preceded by: Yan Song
- Succeeded by: Li Chunfang

Grand Secretary
- In office 1552–1568
- Monarchs: Jiajing; Longqing

Minister of Rites
- In office 1549–1552
- Monarch: Jiajing

Personal details
- Born: 9 October 1503 Xuanping, Zhejiang
- Died: 18 April 1583 (aged 79) Fengxian, South Zhili
- Spouses: Lady Shen; Lady Zhang
- Children: 4
- Education: jinshi degree (1523)

Chinese name
- Traditional Chinese: 徐階
- Simplified Chinese: 徐阶
Transcriptions
Standard Mandarin
- Hanyu Pinyin: Xú Jiē
- Wade–Giles: Hsü Chieh
- IPA: [ɕy̌ tɕjé]

Xu Jie (Note: Xu Jie used the courtesy name Zisheng (子昇) and the art names Shaohu (少湖) and Cunzhai (存齋).) (9 October 1503 – 18 April 1583) was a Chinese scholar-official during the Ming dynasty. He held a high position in the court of the Jiajing Emperor in the mid-16th century, serving as minister of rites from 1549 to 1552, and later as grand secretary and head of the Grand Secretariat from 1562 to 1568.

Xu came from a modest family, relying on the income from a silk factory. His father held lower-level official positions, but prioritized his son's education in Confucianism, which ultimately proved to be a wise investment for the family. Xu Jie excelled in the civil service examinations, achieving the highest level, the palace examination, at the age of 20 in 1523. He was accepted into the Hanlin Academy, and unlike many of his colleagues, he avoided being caught up in the purges during the Great Rites Controversy between the Jiajing Emperor and the government. In 1524, he chose to stay at home to mourn his father's death, which spared him from any potential consequences. In 1530, he openly opposed the Emperor and the government's proposed reforms in the ceremonies associated with the veneration of Confucius. He was sent to the remote mountainous prefecture of Yanping in the southern Chinese province of Fujian to serve as a judge. After a few years, he was promoted to the position of education intendant in Zhejiang and then in Jiangxi. In 1539, he was transferred back to Beijing to the Hanlin Academy, and in 1541, he became the head of the Imperial University. In late 1544, he was appointed as the vice minister of rites, and from early 1545, he served as the vice minister of personnel for four years.

Xu was not only a philosophical and ethical thinker, but also actively participated in organizing the jiangxue debates on Confucian studies and moral self-improvement. In addition to his interest in philosophy and personal growth, he prioritized establishing connections and building relationships with other participants in the discussions. He strategically utilized these friendships and connections for political support. He was known for his efficient management skills and attention to bureaucratic details, as well as his ability to navigate power dynamics and take advantage of opportunities. As a young official, he was known for his energy and strong convictions, even when they went against the government and the Emperor. However, as he matured as a politician, he became more cautious and prioritized fulfilling the Emperor's wishes. Nevertheless, he was not afraid to make quick and decisive decisions when necessary. He leveraged his high political positions to accumulate significant wealth, becoming one of the largest landowners in Jiangnan, the most economically developed region of China. After leaving office, he faced attacks from his political adversaries, but thanks to the support of Grand Secretary Zhang Juzheng, his family was spared severe punishment and the confiscation of their property.

== Youth and early career ==
Xu Jie was born on 9 October 1503 during China's Ming dynasty in Xuanping, Zhejiang Province. His father held the position of vice magistrate and the family later moved to Ningdu, Jiangxi Province when his father was transferred to the same position. Xu Jie's family originated from Huating County, Songjiang Prefecture (present-day Fengxian, Shanghai). They were not particularly well-known, as his father's career began as an assistant employee and he was only able to hold relatively low positions. The family's main source of wealth was a silk factory, where female employees were responsible for weaving silk fabrics. Xu Jie's mother, wives, and daughter-in-law managed the factory in succession.

Candidates are waiting for the results of the examinations; detail from a handscroll by Qiu Ying (1494–1552).

From a young age, Xu focused on studying Confucianism. His father went back to Huating to help him become a shengyuan (county student), and he passed the test at the age of 14, which was earlier than most students. Two years later, Xu Jie failed the provincial examination, but he received help from the new magistrate, Nie Bao, (Note: Nie Bao (1487–1563) successfully passed the palace examination and was granted the title of jinshi in 1517. His first official posting was in Huaiting. Later on, when Xu became grand secretary, he promoted Nie to minister of war. He also promoted Ouyang De, another one of his mentors, to the position of minister of rites.) who regularly met with selected students, including Xu, to "discuss study" (jiangxue). Under Nie's guidance, Xu's perspective shifted from solely seeking status and wealth to contemplating the reasons for studying. He began to understand the importance of gaining literary fame, and, by 1524, he concluded that true success was not measured by external achievements but by internal transformation and actions based on the knowledge of one's own heart and mind.

In 1522, Xu achieved considerable success by passing the provincial examination. Out of several thousand applicants, he ranked seventh among the 135 successful candidates. The following year, the 20-year-old Xu participated in the metropolitan and palace examinations in Beijing with approximately 3,500 other candidates. He achieved third place out of four hundred successful candidates. This was an exceptional achievement for someone of his age, especially considering his high ranking. During the subsequent interview, he made a strong impression on the grand secretaries Yang Tinghe and Fei Hong.

After successfully passing the examinations, Xu was appointed as a junior compiler at the Hanlin Academy. In order to officially begin his career, he was required to marry. As per his parents' arrangement, he married a girl surnamed Shen (1505–1530). On his way back to Beijing, he learned of his father's death. He immediately returned home and spent the next year in mourning. His wife gave birth to their son, Xu Fan (徐璠), in 1529, but she died the following year. Xu Jie then remarried to a girl surnamed Zhang (1516–1583), with whom he had a daughter and two sons—Xu Kun (徐琨), born in 1544, and Xu Ying (徐瑛), born in 1550. Lady Zhang managed their household in Beijing with modesty, fully supported by her husband who did not approve of extravagance. Therefore, she did not spend much, but she—as a devout Buddhist—was generous in charitable donations. She and Xu raised their sons to be polite, humble, and dedicated to their studies. Xu Jie's close relatives included a sister who was married to an officer from Shandong Province, and a younger brother named Xu Zhi (徐智). In 1543, Xu Zhi passed the civil service examinations, earning the rank of jinshi and beginning a successful career in the civil service.

During the mourning period of 1523–1524, Xu Jie remained in his home county and avoided involvement in the official protests that took place in Beijing in August 1524. These protests, known as the Great Rites Controversy, resulted in severe punishments for hundreds of officials, including seventeen deaths. Xu only arrived in Beijing after the protests had ended and visited his friends who had been exiled to distant provinces as punishment. He assisted them in their travels, but did not offer any commentary on the ongoing conflict. This led to sarcastic remarks that he was simply "observing things from the back of the boat" while the conflict between most officials and the Jiajing Emperor unfolded.

After returning to the academy, Xu was tasked with teaching the Emperor's eunuchs. He put in great effort, starting his lectures before dawn and ending them in the late afternoon. Unlike previous years, he raised the level of education for the eunuchs under his care. He convinced these young men, who were used to a more relaxed teaching style, that the knowledge they acquired would benefit their future rise in positions. The alliances he formed with the eunuchs during this time proved to be advantageous in his later career. In the late 1520s, he also occasionally lectured the Emperor. In addition to his official duties, he participated in philosophical discussions in Beijing with his older friend Ouyang De and other like-minded young officials. These men were followers of Wang Yangming's philosophy, and in the following decades, some of them—including the philosophers Zou Shouyi and Luo Hongxian and the prolific writer Tang Shunzhi—grew to be figures of national importance.

== The rites controversy and service in the south ==
In 1530, Xu unexpectedly opposed a proposed revision of the ceremonies and titles associated with Confucius. This proposal was put forth by Grand Secretary Zhang Cong with the knowledge and consent of the Jiajing Emperor. The Emperor and Zhang Cong sought comments on the reform project, but were met with serious opposition. The proposed changes included stripping Confucius of his title of king (wang) and removing statues and paintings from Confucius' temples. They also suggested simplifying the ceremonies at the Temple of Confucius and removing their resemblance to imperial sacrifices. Xu vehemently rejected these changes, arguing that the founder of the Ming dynasty, the Hongwu Emperor, had confirmed the ceremonies and titles associated with Confucius. He believed that the people were accustomed to these traditions and that any changes would cause distrust in the government with unpredictable consequences. Xu was supported by Censor Li Guan and Supervising Secretary Wang Rumei. The Emperor suspected Li Guan of trying to revive the Great Rites Controversy and had him removed from his position. Xu continued to stand by his objections, even when he was heard by the grand secretaries Zhang Cong, Zhai Luan, and Gui E. The debate reached a climax when Xu responded to Zhang's accusation of disloyalty by stating that only a follower of Zhang could betray loyalty to him, which Xu was not and had never been. He also refused the Emperor's demand to withdraw his objections. The Emperor ordered him to be transferred from Beijing. At the urging of Censor-in-chief Wang Hong (汪鋐), who believed the Emperor's decision was too lenient, Xu was then arrested. He was expected to die in prison, but was ultimately transferred to the inland Fujian prefecture of Yanping as a judge thanks to the intervention of high-ranking officials Wen Yuan (聞淵) and Tang Long (唐龍). Xu's dissenting gesture earned him respect and recognition among the officials. He himself later judged it as naive when he based his objections on the belief that "Heaven gives men tongues and the power of speech, so why be afraid to use them?"

Xu spent three years in Yanping. During this time, he was diligent in his duties, resolving long-standing court cases, suppressing banditry, rooting out corruption in the silver mines, and promoting Confucian education—he collected and burned copies of the Legalist-Taoist treatise Deng Xizi, demolished a local shrine, and built a Confucian school in its place. He also personally taught students preparing for the civil service examinations, following in the footsteps of his own teacher, Nie Bao. When he left Yanping, his students showed their appreciation by publishing his collected works. In 1534, he was promoted to provincial educational intendant in Zhejiang Province, and in 1536, he was transferred to the same position in Jiangxi Province. In this role, he oversaw the state schools and helped organize the examinations. He was able to maintain discipline among the students without causing resistance, earning their respect. He was not afraid to discipline even the most talented students if their work was too complex or unclear. He also arranged for his friend Zou Shouyi to focus specifically on the most gifted students in Jiangxi. In 1539, he was called back to Beijing. His career advancement was supported by Minister of Personnel Xu Zan and censors, as well as Xia Yan, who was in charge of the Grand Secretariat in the late 1530s and early 1540s. Xia's support was unlikely considering that Xu had refused Xia's relatives special treatment during his time in Jiangxi.

== Return to Beijing ==
In Beijing, Xu worked at the Hanlin Academy and served as a tutor to the imperial heir, Zhu Zairui, who was born in 1536. In 1539, several of Xu's friends who shared his philosophical and political beliefs were also brought back from exile to tutor the prince. These friends included Zou Shouyi, Luo Hongxian, Tang Shunzhi, and Zhao Shichun. The Emperor dismissed all four by 1541 due to them losing his trust. Zou Shouyi had written a teaching text for Zhu Zairui which the Emperor saw as a criticism of himself. Additionally, the other three proposed that the prince represent his father during ceremonies in 1541 when the Emperor was ill. This proposal was based on precedents from previous reigns, but the Jiajing Emperor interpreted it as a desire for his death and reacted angrily. The grand secretaries called for the execution of the three, but the Emperor ultimately chose to remove them from their positions. Xu was able to avoid trouble because he was at home in Huating at the time, mourning the death of his mother.

In 1541, upon his return, Xu assumed the position of head of the Imperial University. He was well aware of the students' priorities and wrote to a friend that they were primarily interested in mastering the technique of writing the eight-legged essays required for civil service examinations. He noted with disappointment that they showed little interest in the Confucian classics, which were essential for cultivating the mind and self-improvement. In an effort to address this issue, he not only focused on the administrative management of the school, as he had done in the provinces, but also implemented stricter supervision of the students' behavior and studies. He publicly evaluated both of these aspects on a monthly basis. During his tenure, graduates were appointed to offices based on their academic performance and seniority, rather than the amount of money they donated to high-ranking officials.

In November 1544, Xu was appointed as vice minister of rites, and in February 1545, he became vice minister of personnel. After Minister Xu Zan was promoted to the Grand Secretariat in September 1544, the Ministry of Personnel was led by several older and ineffective men, (Note: Successively, Xiong Jie (1478–1554), who was dismissed from office and stripped of his official status in 1545; Tang Long (1477–1546), who fell ill and was likewise removed and stripped of rank in 1546; and finally Zhou Yong (1476–1547), who died in office after just half a year.) overshadowed by the energetic and active Xu Jie. This ministry was responsible for appointing, promoting, and transferring officials, so some of Xu Jie's predecessors avoided interacting with officials in order to maintain impartiality. Xu Jie reminded himself of the importance of honesty and integrity in his duties by inscribing it on the wall of his office. He also did not shy away from his colleagues, and was known for being polite and humble while mingling with both young and older officials. He was praised for his role in the success of several talented individuals, including Ouyang De. In February 1547, Wen Yuan became minister and took a firm hold on the administration. Xu responded by applying for the position of Hanlin academician, which he was granted. In addition to his work at the ministry, he also devoted himself to guiding the graduates of the civil service examinations at the academy, alongside Ouyang De. These included future grand secretaries and Xu's close associates, such as Li Chunfang and Zhang Juzheng. He also worked with Ouyang on a new edition of Da Ming Huidian, a collection of statutes for ministries and state organs at all levels, which regulated their powers and duties.

== Minister ==
In the autumn of 1548, Xia Yan lost a power struggle in the Grand Secretariat and was ultimately executed. Yan Song replaced him as the head of the Grand Secretariat. In the following government changes, Xu Jie was promoted to minister of rites in March 1549. His main focus upon taking on this role was to combat corruption and informal income among officials, as well as improve the management of the ministry. The ministry's responsibilities included confirming the transfer of hereditary titles and ranks from the deceased to their heirs, both for members of the imperial family and for native officials of the tusi; receiving foreign envoys; awarding posthumous titles and ranks to high officials and generals for their services to the state; and potentially financing funeral ceremonies. However, it was common for recipients of these imperial favors to give gifts to the officials who made the decisions. In an effort to reduce this practice, Xu transferred the final decision-making power over requests from ministerial officials to the Emperor. He also reorganized and expanded the ministry's Translators Institute, implementing stricter discipline and introducing examinations for translators and foreign language students. Additionally, he reformed the Imperial Academy of Medicine, reorganized the four-thousand-strong corps of cooks in the Court of Imperial Entertainments, and regulated the work of the cooks, musicians, and dancers assigned to the Court of Imperial Sacrifices. This included reducing the number of cooks from over thirteen hundred to one thousand and dismissing six hundred of the seventeen hundred musicians and dancers.

Beijing after 1553. West Park was located on the western shore of Taiye Lake (blue area), which separated the Imperial City.

The Jiajing Emperor was impressed by Xu's energy and in July 1549, he moved him to his residence in the West Park, located west of the Forbidden City and beyond Taiye Lake. The Emperor had not resided in the Forbidden City since 1542, instead choosing to live in the West Park which he had transformed into a Taoist paradise for the immortals. Only a select few of the Emperor's closest aides were allowed to live and work with him in the West Park, including the grand secretaries, the minister of rites, Taoist priests, and a few military commanders. From 1549 until the Jiajing Emperor's death in 1567, Xu performed his duties as minister (and later as grand secretary) in a limited capacity, and he could only visit his home in Beijing with the Emperor's permission, which he tried to avoid asking for too often to maintain the Emperor's trust in his loyalty. He spent most of his time with the Emperor and made every effort to become a part of his inner circle. The Emperor consulted his Taoist priests daily to seek the will of Heaven, and he expected his inner circle to compose appropriate prayers and petitions for this purpose at any time. Some, like Xu's predecessor Sun Cheng'en, did not consider writing Taoist prayers and supplications as part of their official duties; however, they soon lost the Emperor's favor. Xu, on the other hand, was one of the officials who skillfully and enthusiastically composed Taoist texts for the Emperor. He also sought to establish close relationships with other dignitaries in the West Park. He arranged for his third son, Xu Ying, to marry the daughter of the Emperor's favorite Lu Bing, the commander of the Embroidered Uniform Guard. He also arranged for his second son to marry the granddaughter of Yan Song, but the wedding was canceled after Yan fell out of favor with the Emperor in 1562.

In the fall of 1549, Xu narrowly escaped from a career collapse. One of the perks of his high position was the ability to enroll his son in the Imperial University, where Xu's eldest son, Xu Fan, was studying. However, Xu Fan decided to take the more prestigious route of the imperial examination. He applied for the provincial examination in Nanjing in 1549, but lacked confidence and sent a substitute in his place. This fraudulent act was discovered, and Xu Fan was imprisoned. One of the Nanjing officials, who was a native of Huating and a friend of Xu Jie's from their "discuss study", sent Xu Jie a warning. Xu Jie was able to defend himself and admit his guilt for failing to raise his son properly. He also offered to resign and proposed expelling his son from the university as punishment. The Emperor was satisfied with his minister's humility, and when a request for severe punishment for both son and father reached him through official channels, he ignored it. Xu owed his continued stay in office to the Emperor's extraordinary favor. In contrast, Grand Secretary Zhai Luan was not only dismissed from office but also expelled from the civil service for a similar offense committed by his sons five years earlier, in 1544.

As minister of rites, Xu successfully organized large public events, including the funeral of the Emperor's son and heir, Zhu Zairui, in 1549. The Emperor was devastated by his son's death, and Xu made official requests for the Emperor to select a new heir every year for several years. After the sixth request, the Emperor stated that he did not want to see any more requests, and Xu stopped sending them. In 1552, a year later than was customary for imperial sons, Xu convinced the Emperor to perform the "capping" ceremony, which symbolized the formal acceptance into adulthood, for his remaining two sons. This also marked the beginning of their formal education and the arrangement of their weddings, which took place early the following year. Of the two surviving sons, the Emperor favored the younger Zhu Zaizhen and his mother over the elder Zhu Zaiji. Ceremonies and acts that would have given precedence to the elder as the presumed successor and future emperor were postponed. In 1560, the Emperor sent Zhu Zaizhen from Beijing to his estate in Huguang Province, but refused to name Zhu Zaiji as heir to the throne for the rest of his life.

Xu played an active role in resolving the crisis of 1550, when Mongol invaders penetrated as far as the walls of Beijing. As minister of rites, he proposed military and political measures and organized large prayers to avert barbarian invasions and natural disasters. He also remained vigilant about the situation on the northern border and worked to strengthen defenses against the Mongols.

== Grand Secretary ==
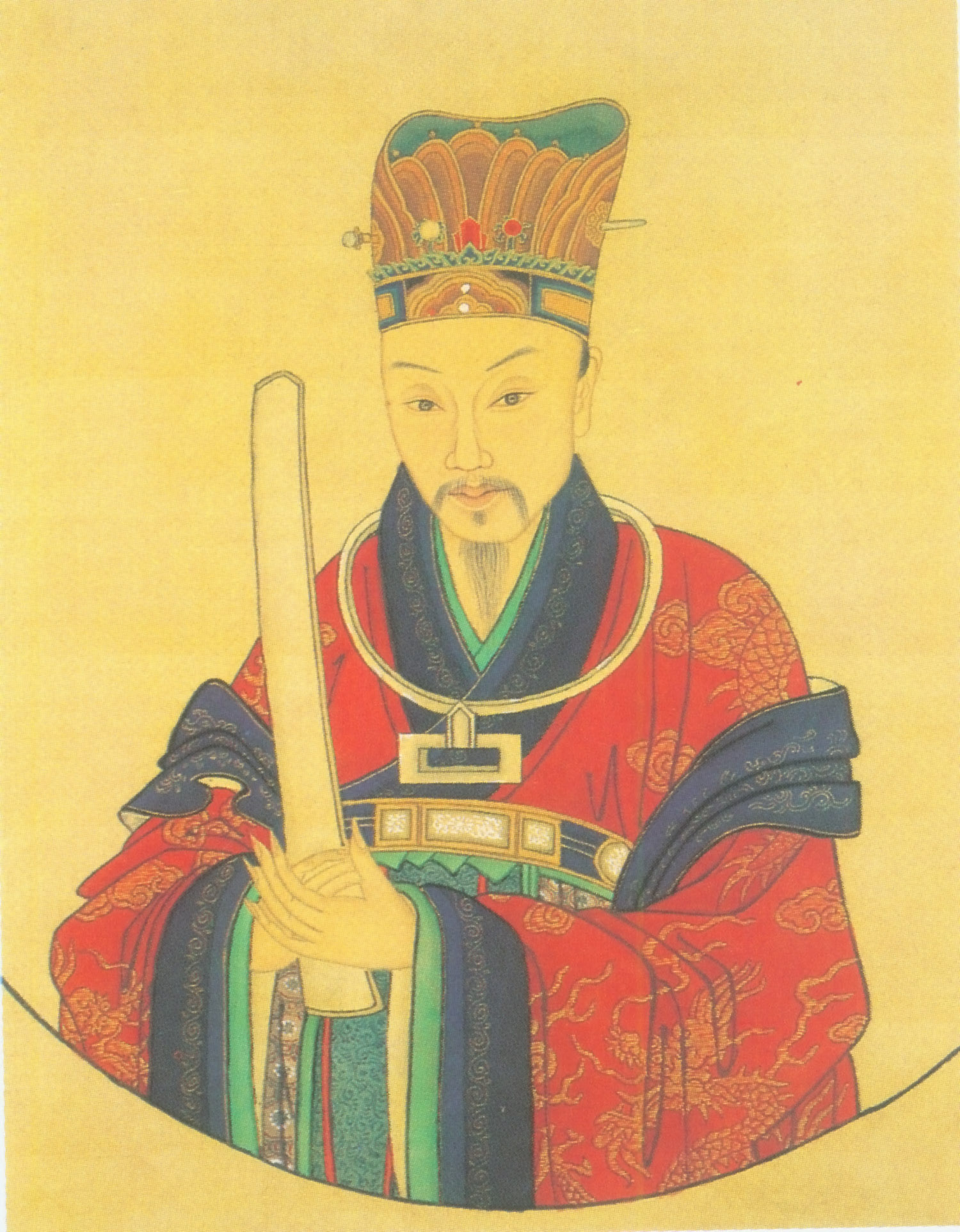
Grand Secretary Yan Song

In April 1552, the Jiajing Emperor promoted Xu to the Grand Secretariat. At the time, there were three grand secretaries, with the most influential being Yan Song. Yan tended to find compromise solutions to difficult situations and was often smug and complacent. Xu, on the other hand, was energetic and decisive. The third grand secretary, Li Ben, was not as strong-willed as his colleagues and focused more on routine work. As the closest aides to the Emperor, the secretaries were often pitted against each other, with Xu being used as a counterweight to Yan. Despite being leaders of rival political cliques, they did not openly display their hostility towards each other. Xu respected Yan's superior position and avoided open confrontations, but still managed to secure positions of power for himself. For example, he promoted Nie Bao to the position of minister of war in 1553, followed by another friend, Yang Bo, who served as minister in 1555–1556 and 1558–1566 before becoming minister of personnel. Xu appointed Ouyang De as his successor at the Ministry of Rites. He also considered Ouyang for the Grand Secretariat, but the latter unexpectedly died in 1554. Despite maintaining a facade of correctness, Xu did not agree with Yan's proposals and actively opposed him. This led to Yan suspecting Xu of being behind the criticism and lawsuits against him, and he even tried to persuade the Emperor to dismiss Xu.

One example of factionalism within the Ming government occurred in the spring of 1558. Wu Shilai, the supervising secretary for the Ministry of Justice, accused three members of Yan Song's party—the minister of war, and two high-ranking officials responsible for the defense of Datong—of incompetence and corruption. They were dismissed and imprisoned. Wu then went on to indict Yan Song and his son Yan Shifan for corruption that had led to the collapse of the northern border defenses. This indictment was supported by two bureau secretaries in the Ministry of Justice. All three of these individuals had connections to Xu Jie. Wu Shilai and one of the secretaries had passed the metropolitan and palace examinations in 1553, when Xu was a member of the examination board. The other secretary was a native of Huating. Yan believed that Xu was behind the accusation and had the three arrested. During interrogation, which was conducted under torture, all three denied any connection to Xu and claimed that they were only concerned with the welfare of the state. It appears that the interrogators did not put much pressure on them, as they were subordinate to Lu Bing, who was Xu's in-law and political ally. In the end, the trio was dismissed from their civil service positions and transferred to the troops guarding the southern border of the empire.

In 1557, Xu's son Xu Fan was appointed as prefect of Guangnan in Yunnan Province. This appointment was likely due to his father's high position, as Xu Jie had been readmitted to the Imperial University six years earlier for the same reason. Xu Fan was also appointed as office manager of one of the chief military commissions. Xu Jie protested that his son, who was only 29 years old at the time, lacked the necessary experience to effectively govern the prefecture. He also argued that he needed his son to manage his household in Beijing so that he could focus on his work. As a compromise, Xu Jie requested a position for his son in Beijing, though it would be a lower one. The Emperor granted this request and appointed Xu Fan as an aide in the Seals Office.

Xu utilized his influence to disseminate Wang Yangming's ethical teachings, which emphasized the inherent goodness in individuals and the importance of recognizing and cultivating this goodness. During his time as minister of rites and grand secretary in the 1550s, he organized the jiangxue debates on Confucian studies, with the goal of promoting personal growth and ethical conduct among participants. These debates were held in the outskirts of Beijing, and sometimes in the city center, and attracted hundreds of students and officials, lasting for several weeks. While officially focused on discussing the correct interpretation of Confucian teachings and the development of one's character, Xu was aware of their potential for political gain and used them to establish connections and a network of like-minded officials who supported his political beliefs. He navigated this carefully, as forming a political faction was illegal under Ming law. His dedication to these debates on Confucian studies ultimately caused a rift between him and two future grand secretaries, Gao Gong and Zhang Juzheng, who both leaned towards Legalism and did not share Xu's passion for Confucianism.

Xu proved a successful politician. He was known for his cautious approach, (Note: For example, while serving as minister of rites, Xu faced a disagreement with the Emperor regarding the proper placement of tablets for the deceased empresses, Lady Chen and Lady Fang, in the Emperor's ancestral temple. Xu received support from Yang Sizhong, the chief supervising for rites. In early 1553, the Emperor had Yang Xiong beaten and removed from his position for a separate issue. Xu understood the situation and chose to withdraw.) but he also had the ability to be flexible and tough when necessary. He thought political decisions should be made through a consensus among senior officials, rather than being dictated by a small group of top dignitaries. He often promoted his political ideas through informal correspondence with officials in different regions, rather than using official channels of communication. This was a unique strategy that set Xu apart from other grand secretaries. Despite not having the authority to give orders, his high position and close relationship with the Emperor gave weight to his recommendations and suggestions, which he often conveyed in a friendly manner. Regional officials could then present his advice as their own proposals, knowing that they would have his support and be well-received by the central government. Additionally, Xu's insider knowledge of events and attitudes within the Beijing authorities was valuable to the recipients of his letters. (Note: In his collected works, more than two hundred such letters to other officials have been preserved.) While he likely used a similar approach with Beijing officials, these interactions were not documented as they were likely oral. One of Xu's main priorities, as well as that of other grand secretaries, was to build a network of allies among the censors who had the power to impeach corrupt and incompetent government officials.

In addition to civilian officials, Xu also placed great importance on talented military leaders. He did not hold any prejudice against the military elite, with whom his family had always maintained good relations. Xu's father had arranged for his sister to marry an officer from Shandong, and Xu Jie himself had married his son to the daughter of a hereditary officer and commander of the Embroidered Uniform Guard, Lu Bing. Xu actively sought out connections with officers, as shown by his trip to Beijing in 1541 with friends from Huating. While there, they engaged in the usual activities of scholars, such as discussing philosophy over good food and drink and visiting famous mountains and Buddhist temples. They also made a stop at the command of the coast guards in Zhenjiang. The commander even treated them to a duel between his men and a drum made from the skin of an executed pirate. Throughout his political career, Xu considered the search for, promotion of, and protection of capable officers to be an essential element of his security policy.

In the 1550s and 1560s, the Beijing area faced security concerns due to ongoing Mongol raids. These raids varied in magnitude and were particularly prevalent in the wider areas of Datong, Xuanfu, and Jizhen. However, the eastern part of Liaodong and the western part of the northern border remained peaceful. The Mongols living opposite the Beijing region demanded the opening of border markets to trade horses and cattle for Chinese goods such as silk, tea, and food. While such markets were already operating in the west and east, the Emperor refused to allow them in this region. This was partly to avoid appearing weak by complying with the Mongol demand, and also because there were many Chinese refugees and emigrants living among the Mongols. Opening the border would only increase the attractiveness of the Mongolian steppes for dissatisfied Ming subjects. Xu, a supporter of the Emperor, shared this stance. In response to Ming China's refusal, the Mongols launched repeated raids. Xu spent a significant amount of time defending the Beijing region. He played a key role in organizing the recruitment and training of soldiers, selecting commanders, and coordinating supplies. He also worked closely with the ministries of war, personnel, and revenue to develop an effective defense strategy. Xu's approach towards the Mongol invaders (and the coastal pirates in the south) was guided by four principles. Firstly, he viewed the invaders as wild anarchic bands rather than representatives of a proper state. Secondly, he believed it was crucial to not cede any territory or meet their demands. Instead, the focus should be on properly organizing the defense of border areas. Lastly, any agreements could only be made if the Ming government had control over the situation and could ensure their fulfillment.

The security of the Beijing region was a major point of disagreement between Xu Jie and Yan Song. Yan suggested abandoning Datong and Xuanfu and moving the defenses closer to Beijing, while also opening border markets. He believed that the Ming armies were no match for the Mongol cavalry and should wait on the city walls until the raiders had finished plundering and returned home. The Emperor expected his generals to respond aggressively to the raids, and those who followed Yan's approach often faced punishment. Yan faced criticism as well, but he convinced the Emperor that it was merely politically motivated. On the other hand, Xu firmly opposed surrendering any territory to the enemy, but he did not have a solution to the conflict. The situation only improved with the opening of border markets and the negotiation of a peace treaty with the Mongols in 1571, after the death of the Jiajing Emperor in 1567, the resignation of Xu Jie in 1568, and the rise of a new generation of politicians, particularly Gao Gong and Zhang Juzheng.

In the 1550s, Xu played a crucial role in the fight against the Wokou pirates. He focused on maintaining order in the Southern Metropolitan Area, particularly in the prefectures of Suzhou and Songjiang, which were significant sources of tax revenue. He addressed various issues such as tax arrears, poor population and land registers, problems with tax calculations and distribution, and corruption in the region. These were all matters of national importance. Additionally, Xu advocated for the transition from in-kind taxes to silver. He shared his powers with Yan Song, who oversaw the struggle against the Wokou and the situation in Zhejiang and Fujian through his adopted son and close aide Zhao Wenhua and the supreme commander of the three coastal provinces, (Note: South Zhili, Zhejiang and Fujian.) Hu Zongxian. While Hu Zongxian's authority technically extended to the Southern Metropolitan Area, Xu still communicated with officials in Nanjing and managed affairs in the region. He paid particular attention to Songjiang Prefecture, which included his home county of Huating. Unusually for a grand secretary, he even maintained written correspondence with prefects and county magistrates despite their low rank.

== Senior Grand Secretary ==
During the 1550s, Xu's influence gradually grew as he gained recognition among officials and the respect of the Emperor. He achieved this through his administrative skills and his willingness to write Taoist prayers and participate in Taoist ceremonies. By the early 1560s, he was able to work behind the scenes to bring about the downfall of Yan Song, the imprisonment and execution of his son Yan Shifan, the confiscation of the Yan family's property, the imprisonment of Hu Zongxian, and the expulsion of Yan Song from the civil service. After Yan's resignation, the Emperor became depressed and considered abdication multiple times (in 1562, 1565, and 1566), but Xu convinced him not to each time. Under Xu's influence, the Emperor regained interest in good governance.

In 1561, Yan Song's wife died. Yan Shifan was unable to visit the palace while mourning his mother, making his 81-year-old father unable to fulfill his duties. In December of that year, a fire broke out in the Emperor's Yongshu Palace in West Park, forcing the Emperor to relocate to the smaller Yuxi Palace on the west bank of Taiye Lake. Yan Song suggested moving the Emperor to an uninhabited palace to the south of the Forbidden City (where Emperor Yingzong had once been held under house arrest), arguing that rebuilding Yongshu Palace would be costly. The Emperor angrily refused and Xu suggested using materials intended for other projects in the Forbidden City to rebuild the palace. Xu's son Xu Fan was appointed bureau secretary in the Ministry of Works and was put in charge of the reconstruction. By the end of April, the palace had been rebuilt. The Emperor's attitude towards Yan cooled and he began to handle government affairs with Xu Jie. That same year, Xu chose to send his sons from Beijing to Huating. In their absence, Xu Fan's role as his father's informal secretary was taken over by Xu Jie's friend and disciple, Yang Yusun (1521–1567), a jinshi, a decisive man, a connoisseur of people, and a brilliant philosopher. After some time, Yang Yusun could not handle the constant requests to meet with Xu Jie and decided to leave for Huguang Province to serve as the grand coordinator.

In 1562, Xu succeeded Yan Song as the senior grand secretary. As he assumed this position, he established three principles for governing the country, which differed from Yan's approach:

- the Emperor should have the final say and his decrees should not be disregarded;
- the six ministries should not be controlled by the Grand Secretariat, as was the case under Yan;
- the censors and supervising secretaries should be able to freely express their opinions without fear of retaliation.

Xu argued that the Emperor should fill official positions based on the recommendations of the Ministry of Personnel or conferences of high dignitaries, but he believed that the Emperor should have the freedom to choose the grand secretaries and minister of personnel independently. Additionally, Xu believed that the minister of personnel should be independent of the grand secretaries. In 1565, when Xu's only colleague in the Grand Secretariat, Yuan Wei (who had replaced Li Ben in 1561), died, Xu expressed to the Emperor that it was not appropriate for him to be the only grand secretary, but he did not provide any recommendations for potential candidates. The Emperor selected two men from southern China to serve in the Grand Secretariat: Yan Na as the minister of personnel and Li Chunfang as the minister of rites. Both were subordinate to Xu, but Yan Na resigned that same year due to illness caused by overwork. The Emperor proposed Dong Fen, a former member of Yan Shifan's clique, as the successor to Li Chunfang as minister of rites. Xu, who typically adhered to his principles, opposed this decision and convinced the Emperor to change his mind. On the other hand, Xu supported Guo Pu and Gao Gong, both northerners, which ultimately proved beneficial when Gao later opposed him.

As senior grand secretary, Xu focused primarily on the most pressing political issues of the 1560s. These included the situation on the northern borders, the defense of the eastern and southeastern coasts, the maintenance of the Grand Canal, and tax collection and reforms in Jiangnan. Xu was able to focus solely on these matters without having to look back at Yan. In the north, the empire's defenses were strengthened. In 1563, Yang Xuan, the commander of Jizhen and Liaodong, provoked the Mongols into a large-scale attack which reached Tongzhou, an important transshipment point southeast of Beijing where the Grand Canal ended. The Ming army responded with more organized counterattacks than in the early 1550s, and the crisis was resolved without causing panic among the population. However, Yang was executed, along with several incompetent officers. The fight against pirates and raiders on the coast shifted from Jiangnan and Zhejiang to the less significant provinces of Fujian and Guangdong in the early 1560s. Fujian was cleared by 1563, while fighting in Guangdong lasted until 1565. After that, piracy was no longer a major issue. The Grand Canal required annual repairs and was severely damaged by a flood in 1565, when the Yellow River overflowed its banks and destroyed 50 km of the canal. After consulting with the grand secretaries and responsible officials, the Emperor appointed Zhu Heng, a capable official with no experience in waterworks, as minister of works and vice censor-in-chief to address the situation. Within a few months, Zhu organized the construction of a new 100-km channel for the river, slightly north of the old one, and restored traffic on the Grand Canal. Although floods continued to occur in subsequent years, they did not have such devastating consequences.

== Resignation ==
In early 1567, the Jiajing Emperor died. Xu, without the involvement of the other grand secretaries (Li Chunfang, Gao Gong, and Guo Pu), but with the assistance of Zhang Juzheng, who was then the head of the Hanlin Academy, drafted the Jiajing Emperor's final edict. This edict was approved by the Emperor's son, the Longqing Emperor, and was published the day after the Emperor's death. Xu also organized the Jiajing Emperor's funeral and the Longqing Emperor's ascension to the throne. The edict, among other things, pardoned officials who had been dismissed, demoted, or executed during the Jiajing era. Those who were able to return to their positions were indebted to Xu, which helped him establish a strong power base. Gao Gong, however, criticised Xu's pardon. He and Guo Pu, but not Li Chunfang, were offended by their exclusion from the edict's drafting.

After the Longqing Emperor's accession, Xu and Gao clashed over the Emperor's involvement in government. Xu believed that the Longqing Emperor, like the Jiajing Emperor, should personally select the highest-ranking officials. Gao argued that the Emperor would not be able to make successful selections from people he did not know. Ultimately, Gao's viewpoint prevailed. In the first half of 1567, Xu and Gao's supporters among the censors accused each other of various missteps and attacked the supporters of the opposing party. (Note: Among other things, Gao reproached Xu in conversation for having obsequiously written Taoist prayers for the Jiajing Emperor, only to betray his policies after his death. Xu retorted that documents existed proving Gao had begged the Jiajing Emperor for acceptance among the writers of those very prayers, which silenced Gao for a time.) Gao had an advantage over Xu as he had been the Longqing Emperor's most popular tutor during the 1560s, but the accusations against Gao were stronger and were accompanied by demonstrations by the censors outside the gates of the Forbidden City. Xu Jie and Li Chunfang offered their resignations, but the Emperor did not accept them. Gao realized that he did not have enough support within the government or with the Emperor and officially resigned in June 1567, citing illness as the reason. A few months later, Guo Pu also resigned, officially due to illness, but in reality due to pressure from the censors who were attacking him for his previous support of Gao Gong. (Note: After his resignation "due to illness", Guo Pu lived for another 26 years in retirement before he died at the age of 82.) In their place, the Longqing Emperor appointed Chen Yiqin, one of his tutors, and Zhang Juzheng to the Grand Secretariat. Both respected Xu's leadership position in the Grand Secretariat.

One year later, a lawsuit was filed against Xu by one of the censors, who happened to be the chief supervising secretary of the Office of Scrutiny for Revenue. This lawsuit largely repeated previous accusations made against Xu. The immediate reason for the lawsuit was that the secretary in question had accepted a large bribe from a salt merchant in exchange for a promise to secure a change in the law that would bring the merchant a significant profit. Xu blocked the proposed change, leaving the secretary unable to return the bribe and fearing exposure. The secretary sought to eliminate Xu by accusing him of writing Taoist prayers and organizing the construction of a new palace for the Jiajing Emperor in 1561/1562, which was seen as dishonest behavior towards Yan Song. The lawsuit also claimed that Xu's involvement in the Jiajing Emperor's final edict was a manifestation of treasonous behavior towards the Emperor, and that he had exceeded his authority in dealing with the Mongol attacks of 1567, overshadowing the Longqing Emperor. In his defense, Xu maintained that he had always respected Yan and had no involvement in his downfall. He argued that he was indicted by the censors with the support of public opinion, and that the case was investigated by officers of the Embroidered Uniform Guard with judicial organs. The Emperor himself had personally decided on guilt and punishment. Xu also defended his writing of the Jiajing Emperor's final edict, stating that it was an expression of loyalty, as it reflected the Emperor’s desire to correct his mistakes and allow the Longqing Emperor to begin his reign in a favorable atmosphere. The subsequent wave of gratitude towards the Jiajing Emperor for his rehabilitation was seen as evidence of Xu's loyalty. Xu also explained the organization of the highest organs of state administration, particularly the competences of the grand secretaries. He clarified that their role was to draft imperial decrees based on the materials and conclusions of the responsible ministries and conferences of high officials. The Emperor's decrees were then implemented by relevant officials and generals without the involvement of the grand secretaries. This was also the case in the decision-making process of 1567. Xu submitted a request for resignation to the Emperor, both to show that he was not attached to his position and because he was not as close to the Longqing Emperor as he was to the Jiajing Emperor. Additionally, his age was beginning to take its toll on him.

In August 1568, the Emperor unexpectedly accepted Xu's resignation due to backstage intrigues by Zhang Juzheng. Xu left office with honor as the Emperor dismissed the accusations against him. Conversely, the accuser was deposed after being accused of corruption. Li Chunfang, the most senior in the service, took over the leadership of the Grand Secretariat. Gao Gong returned to the Grand Secretariat in early 1570 and became the head of the grand secretaries in 1571 after Li Chunfang's resignation (until 1572). In the subsequent purges, Gao Gong and Zhang Juzheng's efforts to eliminate Xu's followers were intertwined with their attempts to limit the influence of neo-Confucian philosophers in the state apparatus. Gao and Zhang saw the philosophers' debates on Confucian principles as "empty talk". The friendships and networks of mutual support that emerged from these debates were seen as dangerous in their influence. In 1570, officials responsible for the education of Confucian students were banned from participating in the jiangxue debates. After Xu's departure from political life, the dominance of Wang Yangming's ideas over China's intellectual elite weakened. For several decades, under pressure from political attacks, the movement focused more on literary expression than on the political revival of the Donglin school.

== Later life ==
Xu Jie's high status and accompanying income brought wealth to his entire family, and their small estate grew to a massive 60,000 mu (over 1,700 ha), making Xu one of the wealthiest landowners in Jiangnan. The family leased this land to thousands of tenants, who paid a total of 9,800 liang (365.5 kg) of silver in rent each year. In addition to their land holdings, the family also invested in lending money to merchants in both Jiangnan and Beijing, acting as a bank and cashing bills drawn in Beijing in the south. Xu was not afraid to use force to protect his interests in the region, often sending hundreds of men (including servants, hired gunmen, and dependent tenants) against his opponents when necessary. (Note: Such "gangs" were often led by influential gentry families, and high-ranking civil officials as well as generals commanded private units of hundreds and thousands of armed men. They formed an elite component of the Ming armies.) Xu did have some concerns about the extent of his land holdings. In the 1560s, he urged officials in Songjiang to investigate the activities of his sons and the administrators of the family estates and to provide redress if necessary, but none of the officials took his requests seriously. At one point, Xu even considered retiring to Huguang Province to be with his friend Yang Yusun, but this plan fell through when Yang died in 1567.

In the years 1569–1570, Xu became embroiled in a conflict with Grand Coordinator Hai Rui. Hai, in an effort to promote societal stability and increase state revenues, sought to return lands to the small peasant class from landowners, who were typically officials or former officials. These landowners enjoyed exemptions from certain taxes, but Hai demanded that they surrender part of their lands. Xu complied by returning some land, but Hai was not satisfied and demanded that Xu hand over half of all his fields. In exchange, Hai promised to leave the remaining fields untouched and not investigate how Xu acquired his property. Hai was forced to resign after a few months in office, (Note: It was reported that Xu Fan encouraged the censors to accuse Hai Rui of misconduct and inciting unrest by offering them a thousand liang (37 kg) of silver.) but this did not end Xu's troubles with the authorities. In 1570, with the help of Zhang Juzheng, Gao Gong returned to the position of grand secretary and launched an investigation into the Xu family. This led to many individuals who had previously given bribes to Xu's sons demanding their money back. Fearing that these individuals would testify against him, Xu Jie paid them back, even if their claims were fabricated. Gao Gong's commissioner gathered evidence against Xu Jie's sons, including usury and fraudulent and intimidating practices to seize small estates. The sons were arrested and recommended for the confiscation of the family's assets, with the possibility of the death penalty, but Zhang Juzheng intervened and negotiated a milder punishment with Gao. Two sons, Xu Fan and Xu Kun, were sent to military service on distant borders, while the third son, Xu Ying, was removed from his official status. Gao, who had been handling the case, repeatedly urged the investigator to close it, stating that he did not want the former senior grand secretary to be arrested as it would have negative political implications. The matter later caused distrust between Gao and Zhang when rumors spread that Zhang had intervened because Xu had given him a bribe of 30,000 liang (1,119 kg) of silver.

Later, Zhang played a crucial role in the rehabilitation of Xu's sons. In the following years, he continued to assist Xu's family in resolving their issues with the authorities. In return, Xu sought informal advice from Zhang on matters of national policy. Xu maintained close contact not only with Zhang, but also with other former and active politicians. His home was always open to visitors and he corresponded with many of his political acquaintances, discussing both local affairs and national political issues. In addition to his political involvement, Xu dedicated himself to managing the family businesses and caring for his large family, which included nineteen grandsons, eight granddaughters, and several nephews and nieces. Among his grandsons, the most successful was Xu Yuanchun, who achieved the rank of jinshi in 1574 and went on to have a successful career culminating in the position of minister of the Court of Imperial Sacrifices. In 1582, Xu Jie's 80th birthday (according to Chinese reckoning) was celebrated with great pomp. An official delegation from Beijing, representing the Emperor, expressed gratitude to Xu for his service to the state and presented him with lavish gifts.

Xu compiled a collection of official and private documents, letters, and records called Shijing tang ji. This collection was privately printed during his lifetime and only became available to the public after his death. In his later years, he created a second collection called Shijing tang xuji which was published in 1608 by one of his grandsons.

Xu died on 18 April 1583, in Huating. His death was mourned in Beijing, where offices were closed for a day. An official from the Ministry of Works was sent from Beijing to organize the funeral. In recognition of his contributions to the state, he was given the posthumous name Wenzhen, meaning "Cultured and Incorruptible" (文貞).

== Assessment ==
Xu was a talented administrator, but above all, he was a skillful, tenacious, and patient player of political games. As grand secretary and then senior grand secretary, he held considerable influence, but his role was primarily advisory and he could only enforce decisions with the support of the Emperor. The extent to which the Emperor relied on the grand secretaries' advice was solely dependent on the Emperor himself. While the Jiajing Emperor saw the grand secretaries as essential supports in decision-making, the Longqing Emperor was more lukewarm towards them. Xu was well aware of the possibilities and limitations of his position and behaved accordingly, placing utmost importance on his relationship with the Emperor. He managed to win the Jiajing Emperor's favor and maintain it for over two decades, a feat that few could have accomplished.

Later Chinese historians generally thought well of Xu, although some had reservations. His public persona was multifaceted, as he was seen as a philosophical and ethical thinker, a capable and efficient manager and statesman with a keen eye for administrative details, and a skilled and cunning manipulator in power struggles. His political actions were generally praised, whether in lower positions or in the secretariat, and he was recognized as the first grand secretary who was able to maintain the trust of the Jiajing Emperor for a long time and use it to implement beneficial measures for the people. However, his political savvy sometimes turned into manipulation, and he was not above using underhanded tactics in political battles, which was viewed negatively by moralizing historians. His support for jiangxue debates on the ethical awakening of personality was evaluated based on the historian's stance on the debates: those who approved of them also saw Xu's support in a positive light, while those who did not viewed it negatively.

From a modern standpoint, John Dardess, an American historian who wrote a monograph on Xu, described him as a "liberal conservative". Dardess believed that he was liberal because he advocated for honesty, transparency, consensus-based decision-making, and freedom of speech among civil servants. He also believed in promoting capable and qualified individuals without being restricted by traditional formalities. Additionally, he aimed to foster an environment of trust, support, and collaboration in his governance. Dardess also saw him as conservative because his main objective was to effectively govern the country while maintaining the existing system, without implementing significant reforms.

== Notes ==
Political offices
Preceded by Yan Song	Senior Grand Secretary; 1562 – 1568	Succeeded by Li Chunfang
