= Zhang Jing (Ming dynasty) =

Ming dynasty politician (died 1555)

- 張經

Supreme Commander of the Southern Metropolitan Region, Zhejiang, Shandong, Guangdong, Guangxi, and Fujian
- In office 17 June 1554 – 4 June 1555
- Monarch: Jiajing Emperor
- Preceded by: Post created
- Succeeded by: Zhou Chong (as Supreme Commander of the Southern Metropolitan Region, Zhejiang, and Fujian)

Minister of War in the Southern Capital
- In office 1553 – 8 November 1554

Supreme Commander of Guangdong and Guangxi
- In office 1537–1544
- Preceded by: Wang Yangming
- Succeeded by: Tao Xie

Grand coordinator of Shandong
- In office 1535–1537

Personal details
- Born: Houguan County, Ming dynasty (present-day Fuzhou, Fujian)
- Died: 12 November 1555
- Courtesy name: Yanyi (延彝)
- Art name: Banzhou (半洲)
- Posthumous name: Xiangmin (襄敏)
- Other name: Cai Jing (蔡經)

Military service
- Battles/wars: Rattan Gorge rebellion; Jiajing wokou raids

Zhang Jing (Chinese: 張經; died 12 November 1555), going by the name Cai Jing (蔡經) for much of his life, courtesy name Yanyi, art name Banzhou, posthumous name Xiangmin, was an official of China's Ming dynasty.

Zhang was involved in the suppression of the Yao rebellions in the southwestern frontier and the defence of Ming China from wokou pirates. At the height of his power, he was made in charge of the military in six provinces, an unprecedented number in the Ming dynasty. Despite winning a great victory against the wokou pirates in 1555, he quickly fell from power by running afoul of the domineering clique of Yan Song and Zhao Wenhua, and was executed by the Jiajing Emperor later in the same year. In 1572, he was posthumously cleared of the charges against him by the Longqing Emperor.

== Early career ==
A native of Houguan county (侯官縣; present-day Fuzhou) of Fujian province, Zhang Jing was noted as a man of tall stature. He took the imperial examinations and received the jinshi degree in 1517 under the name Cai Jing, a name which he retained for close to twenty years.

He first served in the government bureaucracy as a magistrate in the city of Jiaxing in Zhejiang province, a position he held from 1521 to 1525, and from there went into the capital Beijing as a supervising secretary (給事中). There he found favour from the Jiajing Emperor, and successively rose to the positions of vice minister of the Court of the Imperial Stud (太僕寺少卿), right vice minister of the Court of Judicial Review (大理寺右少卿), right vice censor-in-chief (右副都御史), and the grand coordinator of Shandong (山東巡撫). After two years in this last appointment, he was promoted to be the supreme commander of Guangdong and Guangxi in 1537, with the rank of a vice minister of war (兵部侍郎).

== Service in the southwest ==
As supreme commander of the southern provinces of Guangdong and Guangxi, the conflicts of Ming China's southwestern borders and beyond became part of Zhang Jing's responsibility. In Guangxi, violence associated with the bandits and the indigenous Yao people of the Rattan Gorge (藤峽; Tengxia) in southeastern Guangxi had long been troubling the region despite the great suppression campaigns of Han Yong in 1465 and Wang Yangming in 1528. For decades, the jungly ravines of the Rattan Gorge had sheltered several thousand native brigands, who could easily spill out along the Qianjiang River to conduct raids. In the name of quelling local disturbances, Zhang Jing committed 51,000 troops to dislodge the Yao and the bandits from the gorge in 1539, and took up to 1,350 heads in the operation while receiving the surrender of three thousand men and women. The operation brought some degree of Ming control to the Rattan Gorge area and demonstrated Chinese military might to neighbouring Vietnam, itself on the verge of war with China.

In Vietnam, the Ming tributary state ruled by the Lê dynasty was overthrown in 1527 by Mạc Đăng Dung, who declared himself emperor of a new Mạc dynasty. The Ming court in Beijing sided with the ousted Lê house and wished to punish the usurper by sending an expeditionary force into Vietnam in 1538. Zhang Jing, being acutely aware of the situation on the ground, memorialized the throne against war, arguing that the manpower and resources of his territorial command could not support such a campaign.

The Jiajing emperor shelved the campaign because of the memorial, but brought it up again the next year. Obligated to follow a policy that he did not agree with, Zhang Jing sought peace with Mạc Đăng Dung while trying portray the peace as a victory for the Ming. He advised Mao Bowen (毛伯溫), the commander-in-chief of the expeditionary forces, to concentrate troops on the border but not to engage the Mạc men in battle. The presence of the Chinese forces on the border was enough to threaten Mạc Đăng Dung into submission. Zhang Jing worked with Mạc Đăng Dung to make sure the latter wrote a letter of surrender that was acceptable to the Ming court. In the end, Mạc Đăng Dung declared his submission to the Ming in a ceremony at Zhennan Pass in 1540, and the Ming allowed Mạc to rule northern Vietnam. A major war was averted.

Zhang Jing went on to subdue the aboriginal tribes in western Guangxi and Hainan Island and was awarded the rank of minister of War and right censor-in-chief (右都御史) for his services. He remained in the southwest until 1544, when he relinquished his post to mourn the death of his father in accordance with Confucian filial rites.

== Wokou crisis ==
Zhang Jing returned to public service under his original surname Zhang in 1546, when he was appointed as supreme commander of Shaanxi, but the emperor withdrew the appointment after Zhang Jing was accused of irregularities in handling military funds during his time in Guangdong. In 1551, Zhang Jing was once again called upon to take the position of Minister of Revenue in Nanjing, the secondary capital, but was prevented from doing so because of the death of his mother. Upon returning from his period of mourning in 1553, he served as the Nanjing Minister of Revenue for two months before being transferred to become the Nanjing Minister of War.

Unlike the other largely ceremonial minister roles in Nanjing, the Nanjing Minister of War could lead troops and was expected to play a part in the defence of the southern provinces. At this time the eastern seaboard was under attack by the pirates known as the "wokou", and Zhang Jing's assignment to the position was part of the Ming court's response to the onslaught. A new supreme commander position was eventually created for the first time in this area, overseeing an unprecedented six coastal provinces: Shandong, the Southern Metropolitan Region, Zhejiang, Fujian, Guangdong, and Guangxi. Zhang Jing was assigned to this position on 17 June 1554. To focus on his military command, Zhang Jing asked to be relieved of his ministerial duties; the request was granted on 8 November.

To dislodge the pirates from their stronghold of Zhelin (柘林) southeast of Shanghai, Zhang Jing called in reinforcements from Shandong, Guangxi, and Huguang. Six thousand recruits from Shandong arrived first, but they suffered a devastating defeat and had to disband. Zhang Jing decided to gather his strength and wait for the 11,000 aboriginal troops to arrive. However, the apparent lethargy with which Zhang Jing carried out his mission attracted criticism.

His critics also point out that Zhang was an arrogant man who led a luxurious lifestyle, and lacked tact when dealing with others, especially his subordinates. With the tremendous power he held, Zhang Jing would punish officers for private matters such as giving him an angry look, and once even flogged a vice-prefect for criticizing him — never since the establishment of the dynasty had a vice-prefect been treated this way.

He also refused to work with Zhao Wenhua, the commissioner sent by the emperor to scrutinize his actions, since he considered himself above Zhao's rank. Zhao Wenhua, however, had considerable influence since he was a protege of the Senior Grand Secretary Yan Song, who controlled the imperial court. Zhao Wenhua had urged Zhang Jing to attack the pirates, but Zhang Jing resisted and would not even discuss his strategy with him, so Zhao retaliated by writing a memorial to the throne accusing Zhang Jing of deliberately delaying the operation for his own profit.

Zhang Jing's plan was to starve the pirates out of their base in Zhelin while waiting for the Ming reinforcements to arrive. The pirates were compelled to leave their fortified positions and were waylaid by Ming forces in the Battle of Wangjiangjing (王江涇), north of Jiaxing, on 10 May 1555. Zhang Jing and his generals Lu Tang and Yu Dayou unleashed the newly arrived aboriginal troops on the pirates and took 1,900 heads in what became the greatest Ming victory so far in the anti-wokou campaign.

Despite the great triumph, Zhao Wenhua's denunciation of Zhang Jing reached Beijing, where Zhao's mentor Yan Song convinced the emperor that the victory proved that Zhang Jing had the capability to defeat the pirates, only striking when he heard about Zhao Wenhua's accusation against him. Infuriated, the emperor ordered Zhang Jing's arrest on 5 June.

== Death ==
Yan Song's indictment of Zhang Jing was endorsed by Yan's political rivals, the Grand Secretaries Xu Jie and Lü Ben (呂本), who were natives of the pirate-plagued districts and thus acutely aware of the situation under Zhang Jing's command. When Zhang Jing was brought to Beijing for investigation, he tried to bribe the three grand secretaries to the tune of tens of thousands in money, but none would accept. The Jiajing Emperor, wishing to make an example of Zhang Jing for his inaction, sentenced him to death despite his pleas. He was executed on 12 November 1555 along with Yang Jisheng, a known critic of Yan Song. His supreme commander position was seen as too powerful, so his successor's command was limited to only the Southern Metropolitan Region, Zhejiang, and Fujian.

Later commentators lamented the tragic fate of Zhang Jing, who was rewarded with execution for his victory at Wangjiangjing. Despite the unanimous decision of the three grand secretaries, numerous commentators blamed his death on Yan Song and Zhao Wenhua, who had become reviled figures in Ming historiography. On 5 July 1600, the charges against Zhang Jing were cleared, his official titles were restored, and he was given the posthumous name Xiangmin (襄敏).
