= Zhao Wenhua =

- 趙文華

Minister of Works
- In office May 3, 1556 – September 13, 1557
- Monarch: Jiajing Emperor
- Preceded by: Wu Peng
- Succeeded by: Lei Li

Personal details
- Born: Cixi, Zhejiang, China
- Died: 1557
- Courtesy names: Ronggang (榮崗); Yuanzhi (元質)
- Art name: Rongjiang (蓉江)

Military service
- Battles/wars: Jiajing wokou raids

Zhao Wenhua (Chinese: 趙文華; died 1557) was a Chinese public official during the reign of the Ming dynasty's Jiajing Emperor.

After initial setbacks in his career, Zhao became a close confidant to Grand Secretary Yan Song, eventually becoming a vice minister. At the time, the Chinese coast was plagued by a series of raids by Chinese smugglers. Zhao disagreed with how the military was handling the situation and made his own recommendations, which the military ignored. After the Emperor lost confidence in Minister of War Nie Bao, he tasked Zhao with solving the crisis himself.

Zhao quickly came into conflict with other officials that were already at the coast, and went on to orchestrate the removal of several of them, as well as a prominent court official. Zhao rose to the rank of Minister of Works and positioned his protege Hu Zongxian as supreme commander, a role that Hu excelled in. Zhao, however, had earned the disdain of other figures in the court, and his disregard for etiquette alienated even Yan Song. After being accused of accepting bribes, exaggerating his victories, and diverting lumber meant for the Forbidden Palace towards the construction of his own personal estate, Zhao lost the Emperor's favor and was removed from his post. He died shortly thereafter. While the official history attributed it to a hernia, another source indicated that he committed suicide by poison.

Both he and Yan Song are listed as "Treacherous Ministers" (奸臣傳) in the official historical work History of Ming by Zhang Tingyu.

== Early career ==
A native of Cixi, Zhejiang, Zhao Wenhua passed the imperial examination as a jinshi in 1529, whereupon he served as a secretary in the ministry of justice (刑部主事). Although he gained a name for being a skilled essayist in this post, he was found to have neglected his duty and was demoted to the post of vice prefect of Dongping, Shandong (東平州同知). Through the connection he made while he was studying at the National University, Zhao was eventually attached to the Office of Transmission (通政司) by the Grand Secretary Yan Song, who had noticed Zhao's talent when he was the chancellor of the university. In the Office of Transmission, Zhao Wenhua was to intercept all communications that put Yan Song in a negative light and hence foil any impeachment attempts. Zhao Wenhua cooperated so well in this manner that they became close, and Yan Song considered him as an adopted son. He later became a vice minister of works (工部右侍郎) for his proposal to build the southern city wall of Beijing.

== Wokou crisis ==
During the 1540s and the 1550s, the Chinese coast was beset by the wokou, "Japanese pirates" in name, but actually predominantly Chinese smugglers turning to plunder and pillage when their illegal trade was suppressed. Zhao Wenhua presented a number of memoranda suggesting solutions to the problem of the Jiajing wokou raids, in which he showed a deep understanding of the root causes of the crisis. He did not agree with the sort of heavy-handed suppression in the name of the maritime prohibition laws that was carried out by the Zhejiang grand coordinator Zhu Wan (and had tried to coerce the latter into leaving his post to no avail), and instead vouched for an eventual opening of trade as the means to solve the wokou problem. The Minister of War Nie Bao did not act on Zhao Wenhua's suggestions and offered no alternate plan of his own, which prompted the Jiajing Emperor to purge the Ministry of War and send Zhao Wenhua to go to the coast to formulate the government's response to the crisis in person on March 1555. He was also authorized to lead the military forces there.

Upon arriving onto the scene, the headstrong and ambitious Zhao Wenhua came into conflict with the coastal military and administration. He plotted against grand coordinator Cao Bangfu (曹邦輔), whose rapid action against bandit forces at Lake Tai prevented Zhao from claiming credit for the success there. When his own forces were forced to retreat at Taozhai, Zhao placed the blame for his own failure on Cao, and was able to have him arrested and exiled. Of greater consequence was his role in the downfall of the supreme commander Zhang Jing. Zhao Wenhua had urged Zhang Jing, who had been gathering his strength, to attack the pirates, but Zhang resisted and would not even discuss his strategy with him. Zhao Wenhua retaliated by writing a memorial to the throne accusing Zhang Jing of deliberately delaying the operation for his own profit. However, soon after Zhao Wenhua sent out the memorial, Zhang Jing achieved a major victory over the pirates at Wangjiangjing (王江涇) on 10 May 1555. Too late to recant his earlier statement, Zhao was quick to claim the credit for himself and his protege Hu Zongxian; as a result he was able to successfully petition the Court for the execution of Zhang Jing.

Zhang Jing was eventually replaced by Yang Yi (楊宜), who tried to curry favour with Zhao to prevent suffering a similar fate as Zhang Jing. However, Yang was ineffective in his role, and Zhao Wenhua recommended Yang's removal when he returned to Beijing to report to the emperor. Zhao tried to set up Hu Zongxian in Yang's place, but the Minister of Personnel Li Mo (李默), who detested Yan Song's clique, picked Wang Gao (王誥) instead. Zhao Wenhua responded by impeaching Li Mo, suggesting that Li had slighted the emperor. The infuriated emperor threw Li Mo in prison and promoted Zhao Wenhua to Minister of Works and Grand Guardian of the Heir Apparent (太子太保) on May 3, 1556. Wang Gao had hardly arrived in his post before he was replaced by Zhao's candidate, Hu Zongxian.

As it turned out, Hu Zongxian was extremely successful as supreme commander. In August 1556, Hu and Zhao, who had returned to the field on the emperor's orders, annihilated the pirate Xu Hai's invasion force and captured a number of pirate leaders, who were later executed. Returning to Beijing triumphant, Zhao Wenhua took much of the credit for the victory, and was conferred the title of junior guardian (少保) while his son Zhao Yisi (趙懌思) was made a chiliarch (千戶) in the Embroidered Uniform Guard.

== Downfall and death ==
Zhao Wenhua had now reached the apex of his career. However, he had by this time become arrogant and earned the enmity of people from government officials to the court eunuchs. Even Yan Song and the emperor had become annoyed by his disregard of etiquette. He once tried to bypass Yan Song in pleasing the emperor, presenting a medicinal wine to the emperor claiming that it was the secret of Yan's longevity. The emperor liked the wine, and later asked Yan Song about it, who was quite surprised and had to confess that he knew nothing about the wine. Yan almost severed relations with Zhao Wenhua for this transgression if not for the good words by Yan's wife. In another incident, Zhao Wenhua was so drunk that he failed to bow and kneel when receiving a gift from the emperor through an eunuch.

As Minister of Works, Zhao Wenhua was responsible for constructions in the Forbidden Palace. He failed to finish a new storied building in the palace's western garden in time, yet the Jiajing Emperor saw Zhao Wenhua's new mansion being finished on the Chang'an Avenue across from the palace. An aide commented that the reason Zhao could not finish the building in the palace because he had diverted most of the timber to build his own mansion. The emperor was greatly displeased. Then, in May 1557, a fire burned down three palace halls. The emperor ordered Zhao Wenhua to rebuild the tower on Zhengyangmen as soon as possible, but Zhao demurred. Around this time the emperor heard rumours that Zhao had taken bribes and exaggerated his victories in the south, and lost faith in the man entirely. Yan Song attempted to cover for Zhao Wenhua, saying that he had taken ill from his tour to the south. Zhao Wenhua followed up by asking for a short leave of absence for rest and recovery, upon which the emperor ordered the vice minister to take Zhao Wenhua's post so that Zhao could go home on September 13. Zhao was essentially sacked at this point.

The emperor felt this was not enough to punish Zhao Wenhua, but no one had dared to speak out against Zhao Wenhua due to Yan Song's influence at the court. It was at this time that Zhao Wenhua's son Zhao Yisi petitioned the court to be excused from his duties so he could escort his father home. The petition was ill-timed, since it was presented at a time of imperial ceremonial fasting when no petitions could be presented. This allowed the emperor to reduce Zhao Wenhua to a commoner and banish Zhao Yisi to the military frontiers on a technicality on September 23. Zhao Wenhua died on his way home, with the History of Ming recording that he died due to a hernia while another source said he took poison. His family was ordered to repay the government funds that Zhao had misappropriated in his lifetime, to the tune of over one hundred thousand taels. Less than half this money was recovered by 1583, and the authorities recommended that the case be dropped. The Wanli Emperor refused, and banished Zhao Wenhua's second son Zhao Shensi (趙慎思) to the swamps of southwestern China. Zhao Wenhua and his mentor Yan Song are traditionally reviled in Ming historiography, their biographies being placed under the section "Treacherous Ministers" (奸臣傳) in the official History of Ming.
