= Zhili (province) =

Historical province of the Republic of China

Zhili 直隸
- Province of the Republic of China
- 1912–1928
- Location of Zhili in the Republic of China
- Capital: Beijing
- History
  - Established: 1912
  - Disestablished: 1928
- Today part of: China; Hebei; Beijing; Tianjin; Liaoning; Henan; Inner Mongolia

Zhili, formerly romanized as Chih-li, Chihli, or Pe-tche-li, was a historical province of the Republic of China. It mostly covered the area of the Ming province of Beizhili and took its name (lit. "Directly Administered Area") from its status as the region surrounding the imperial capital, Beijing. Its boundaries were close to the modern Hebei.

In 1645, the Qing dynasty established their capital at Beijing, stripping Nanjing of its status as a capital city during the Ming dynasty. As a result, the Ming province of Nanzhili, the southern counterpart to Beizhili, lost its status as a "directly ruled" capital region and was renamed Jiangnan Province. Beizhili thus became renamed as Zhili.

The name Zhili indicates regions directly ruled by the imperial government of China. During the 18th century, the borders of Zhili province were redrawn to encompass what is today Beijing, Tianjin, and the provinces of Hebei, western Liaoning, northern Henan, and the Inner Mongolia autonomous region.

After the collapse of the Qing dynasty in 1912, the Republic of China initially maintained Zhili as a province. However, in 1928, Zhili was dissolved, with the majority of its territory going towards Hebei.

== Gallery ==
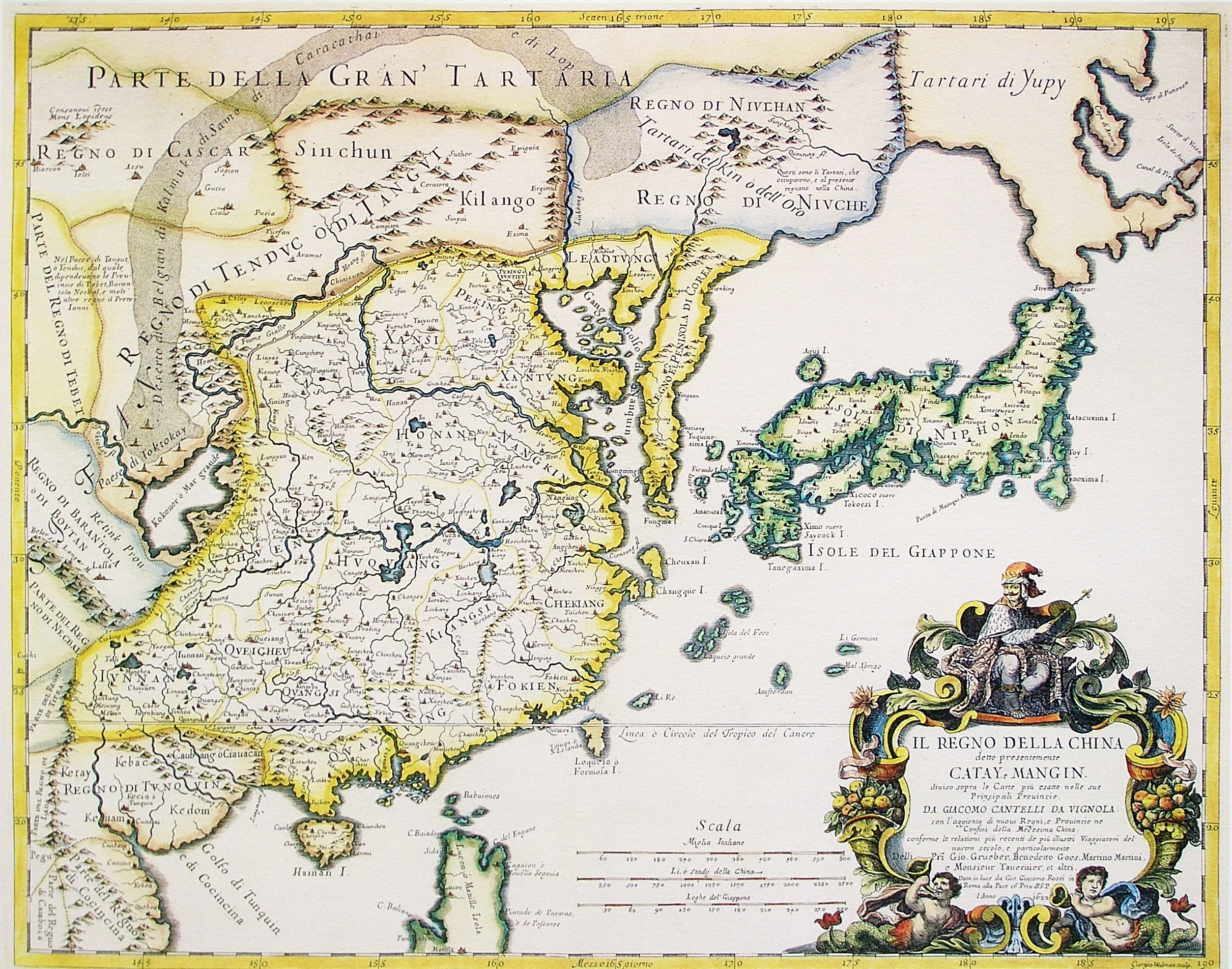
A 1682 map of the "Kingdom of China, Presently Called Cathay and Mangi", using the names "Peking" (Beijing) and "Nangking" (Nanjing) to refer to the Northern and Southern Zhilis

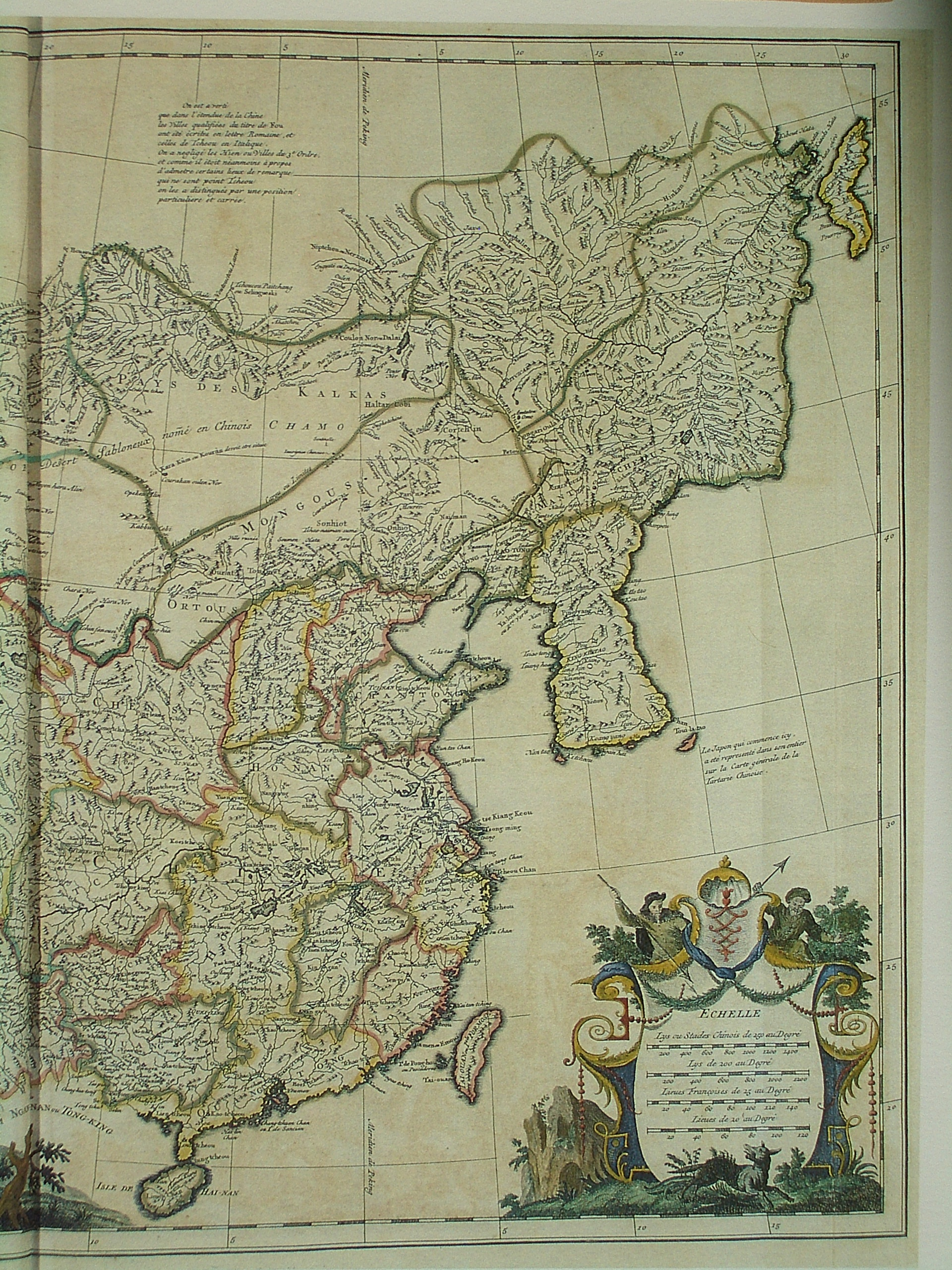
The eastern half of D'Anville's 1734 map of China, Chinese Tartary, and Tibet, displaying "Pe-tche-li" (North Zhili) after its southern counterpart became known as "Kiang-nan" (Jiangnan)

Map of Zhili in the Qing dynasty

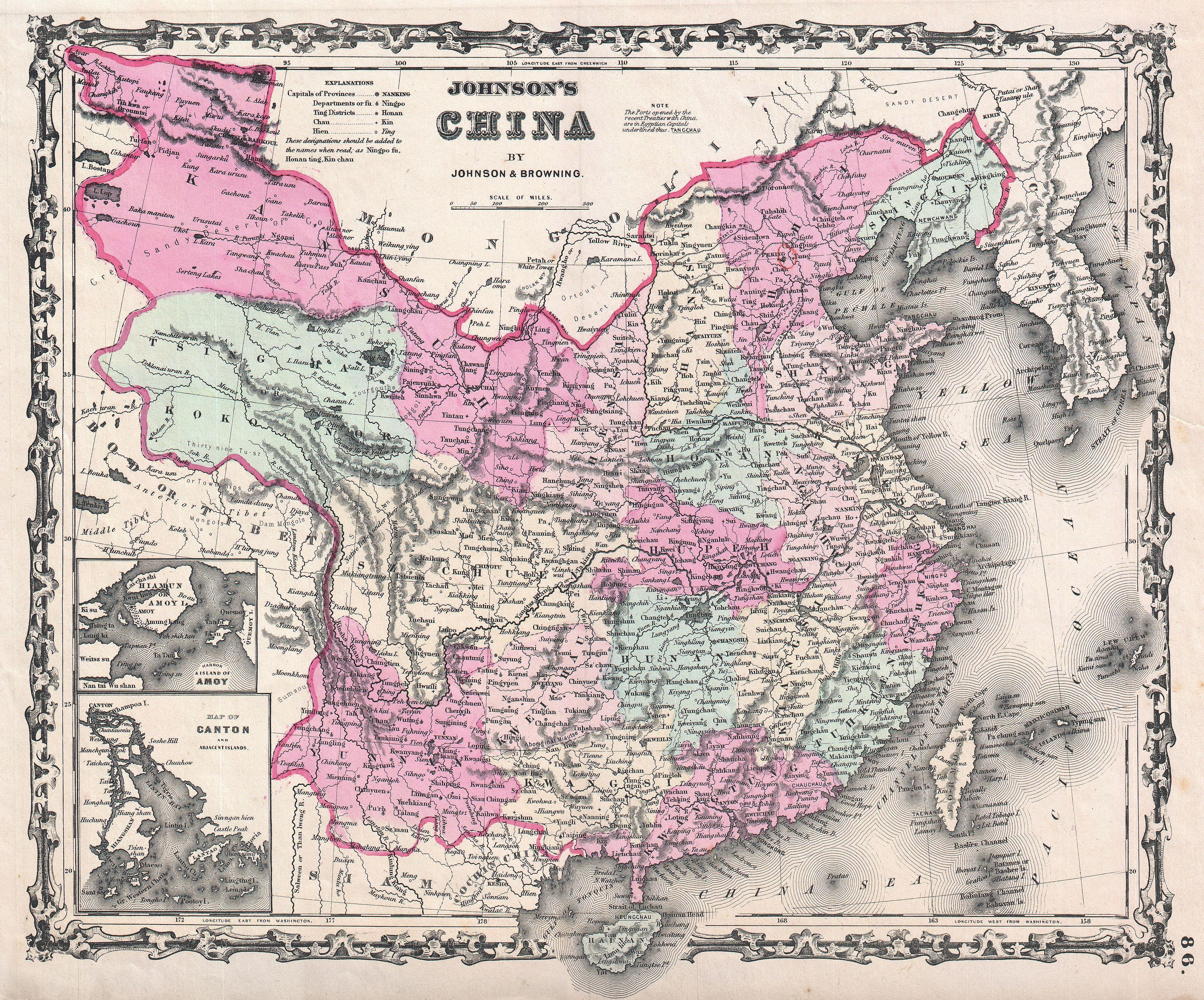
A map from 1861, which shows "Chihli" (Zhili). The former Jiangnan had already been divided between "Kiangsu" (Jiangsu) and "Nganhwui" (Anhui)

== Sources ==
- Li, Lillian M. (1992). "Grain Prices in Zhili Province, 1736–1911: A Preliminary Study". In Rawski, Thomas G.; Li, Lillian M. (eds.). Chinese History in Economic Perspective. University of California Press.
