= Jiangxue =

Jiangxue (Note: Simplified Chinese: 讲学; traditional Chinese: 講學; pinyin: jiǎngxué; lit. 'lecture and discussion') refers to discussions that took place in Confucian academies during the Song, Ming, and Qing dynasties (12th–19th centuries) with the aim of promoting moral self-improvement.

The lectures and debates called jiangxue became a crucial educational tool during the Southern Song dynasty in the 12th century, coinciding with the rise of Neo-Confucianism and the growth of private Confucian academies. Through these debates, scholars both within and outside of the academies sought to clarify their understanding of Confucianism and exchange ideas on how to become a virtuous individual and achieve moral perfection. While these discussions primarily took place in academies, they also occurred in other spaces such as Buddhist or Taoist temples and monasteries, which were better suited for larger gatherings.

In the early 16th century, there was a surge in popularity for jiangxue discussions. Wang Gen, a disciple of Wang Yangming and a former salt merchant, used these discussions to spread his master's teachings to a wider audience. These discussions were no longer limited to scholarly debates. Wang would lecture, or even preach, to large crowds consisting of people from all walks of life—including peasants, artisans, and merchants. Scholars and gentry, who were seen as the elite ruling class, were often suspicious and hostile towards these popular leaders who preached about philosophy and the right way of life to the general population. Despite this, the scholars themselves also participated in jiangxue discussions among their own peers.

From the mid-16th century, these debates took on a political dimension as leading officials, such as Xu Jie, began to use the connections and friendships formed in these discussions to build networks of political support. This trend continued until the early 1570s when politicians such as Gao Gong and Zhang Juzheng saw the debates and resulting alliances as a threat to their policies and suppressed them. Local officials responsible for education were banned from participating in debates. The debate movement was revived in the early 17th century by followers of the Donglin Academy, but this time it was limited to the gentry, excluding other social classes. The jiangxue debates experienced a resurgence in the late 1620s with the establishment of the Revival Society (fushe). After the Qing conquered China in the second half of the 17th century, the debates came under strict government control.
