= Nie Bao =

Chinese official and philosopher (1487–1564)

- 聶豹

Minister of War
- In office 1553–1555
- Monarch: Jiajing
- Preceded by: Weng Wenda
- Succeeded by: Yang Bo

Personal details
- Born: 6 February 1487 Yongfeng, Jiangxi
- Died: 19 November 1563 (aged 76)
- Education: jinshi degree (1517)

Philosophical work
- School: Jiangyou School of Wang Yangming's Philosophy
- Notable works: Kunbianlu (困辯錄; 'Records of the Difficulties of Understanding')

Nie Bao
- Traditional Chinese: 聶豹
- Simplified Chinese: 聂豹
Transcriptions
Standard Mandarin
- Hanyu Pinyin: Niè Bào

Nie Bao (Note: Nie Bao used the courtesy name Wenwei (文蔚) and the art name Shuangjiang (雙江). He was given the posthumous name Zhenxiang (貞襄).) (6 February 1487 – 19 November 1563) was a Chinese scholar-official and Neo-Confucian philosopher during the Ming dynasty. As a statesman, he attained the position of minister of war, and as a philosopher, he was one of the representatives of the Jiangyou school, one of the schools into which the followers of Wang Yangming diverged.

== Biography ==
Nie Bao was from Yongfeng County in Ji'an, located in the southern province of Jiangxi, China. He dedicated himself to studying Confucian classics and successfully passed the civil service examinations in 1517, achieving the highest level of the palace examination and earning the rank of jinshi.

Following his examinations, he assumed the role of county magistrate in Huating (now part of Shanghai), where he displayed great diligence and determination. (Note: His activities included investigating land-related machinations, repairing irrigation canals, relocating more than three thousand refugee households, building a shrine to outstanding local natives, establishing an archery training ground, renovating the county school buildings including the student dormitory, and giving daily instruction in Confucianism to selected registered students (shengyuan), among them Xu Jie.) His civil service career was interrupted when he was imprisoned from 1544 to 1549 on charges of corruption. Upon his release, he returned to his position and even rose to the rank of minister of war from 1553 to 1555. Nie's career was greatly aided by his former student Xu Jie, who served as grand secretary from 1552 to 1568 and was one of the Jiajing Emperor's closest advisors. Together with Nie and Ouyang De, Xu organized debates on Confucian teachings in Beijing, which attracted thousands of examination candidates.

In his studies of Confucianism, he was particularly drawn to the teachings of Wang Yangming. These teachings had a profound impact on him, as he had studied them intensively during his time in prison. His focus was on meditation and achieving inner peace, with an emphasis on the importance of moral strength (gongfu) in realizing liangzhi, or the knowledge of innate goodness. This, in turn, would lead to correct and ethical behavior, such as filial devotion (xiao), which was seen as the path to wisdom and ultimately, teaching others.

He documented his philosophical views in the work Kunbianlu (困辯錄; 'Records of the Difficulties of Understanding').
