= Investigating censor =

Censoring officials of some Chinese dynasties

- Traditional Chinese: 監察御史
- Simplified Chinese: 监察御史
- Literal meaning: Monitoring & Investigating Royal Scribe/historian
Transcriptions
Standard Mandarin
- Hanyu Pinyin: jiānchá yùshǐ
- Wade–Giles: chien-ch'a yü-shih

Investigating censors (Chinese: 監察御史; lit. 'Monitoring & Investigating Royal Scribes/historians') were Censorate officials in imperial China's civil bureaucracy between the Sui (581–618) and Qing (1644–1912) dynasties. They were in charge of investigations and impeachment, including duties such as gathering complaints from the people, reviewing the handling of prisoners and impeaching officials for misconduct.

Since the Yuan dynasty, investigating censors were also authorized to submit remonstrances or suggestions about the emperor's conduct or policies.
