= Beizhili (Ming province) =

Historical province of the Ming dynasty

Beizhili 北直隸
- Province of the Ming dynasty
- 1376–1645
- Capital: Beijing
- History
  - Established: 1376
  - Disestablished: 1645
- Today part of: China; Hebei; Beijing; Tianjin; Shandong; Henan

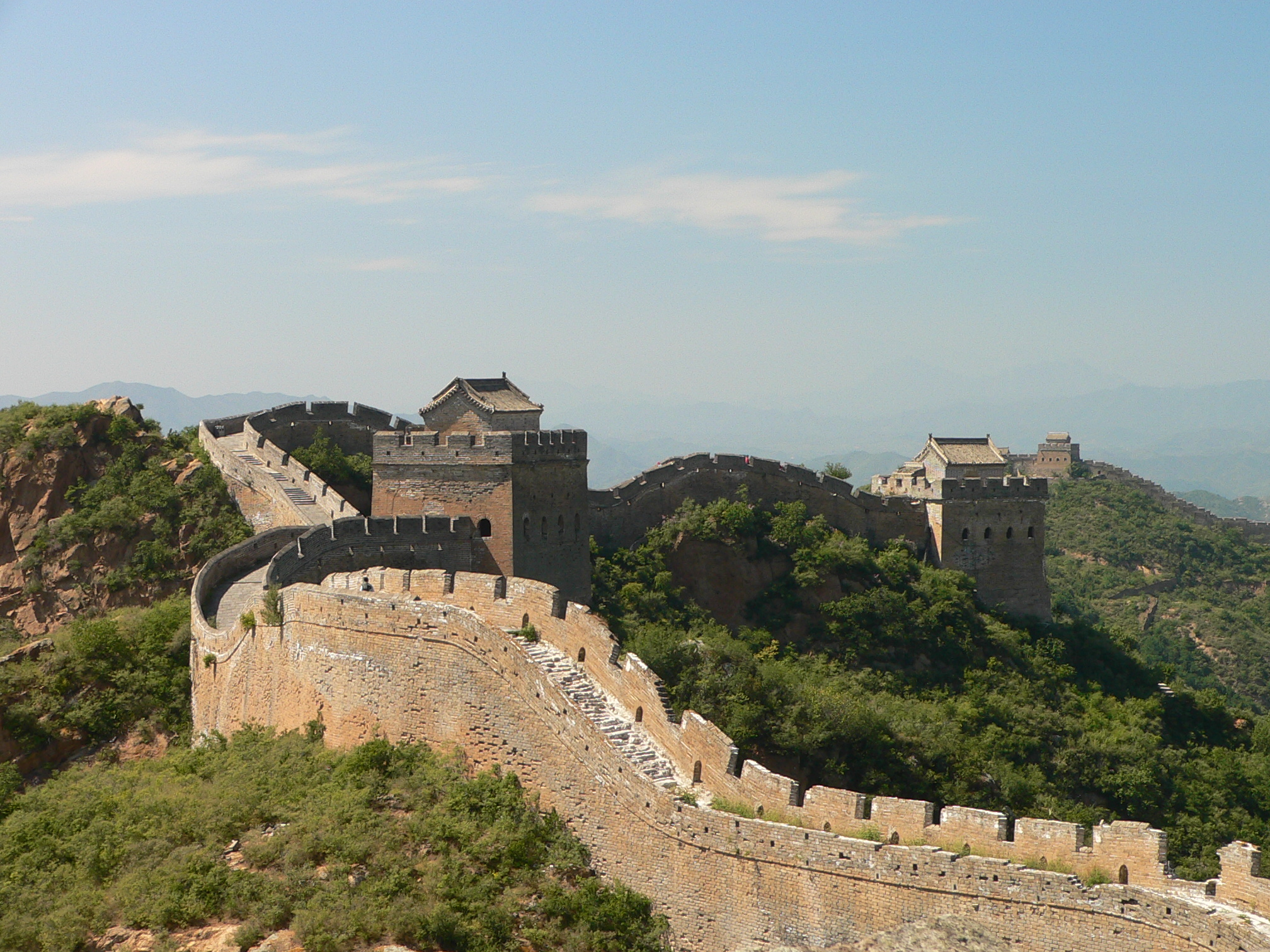
The Great Wall, largely constructed in its present form as protection against the Northern Yuan when the Ming administered the area around it as Beizhili

Beizhili, formerly romanized as Pei-chih-li, Pechili, Peichili, etc. and also known as North or Northern Zhili or Chih-li, was a historical province of the Ming dynasty. It mostly covered the area of the Yuan province of Zhongshu (lit. "Central Administration") and took its own name (lit. "Northern Directly Administered Area") from Beijing's status as one of the Ming dynasty's capitals.

Due to Beijing being the imperial capital, the Ming dynasty exempted the surrounding region from the standard administrative hierarchy of provinces, prefectures, and counties. Instead, Beizhili and its southern equivalent, Nanzhili, functioned as unique administrative zones. Neither region was overseen by a provincial governor; local administrators reported straight to the central government ministries in the capital. The city of Beijing itself was administered as part of Shuntian prefecture, an entity established under the Yongle Emperor that eventually grew to govern twenty-two subordinate counties and departments. This central-heavy structure fostered a strong local identity tied to the prefecture, but it prevented the city from integrating with the broader region. As a result, the unified provincial identity that characterized other Ming territories never materialized in Beizhili.

In 1645, at the beginning of the Qing dynasty, the name of Beizhili was changed to Zhili.

== See also ==
- Nanzhili (Ming province)

== Sources ==
- Naquin, Susan (2000). Peking: Temples and City Life, 1400–1900. University of California Press. ISBN 978-0-520-21991-5.
