= Ouyang De =

Chinese official and philosopher (1496–1554)

- 歐陽德

Minister of Rites
- In office 1552–1554
- Monarch: Jiajing
- Preceded by: Xu Jie
- Succeeded by: Wang Rongbin

Personal details
- Born: 1496 Taihe, Jiangxi
- Died: 24 April 1554 (aged 57–58)
- Education: jinshi degree (1523)

Philosophical work
- School: Jiangyou School of Wang Yangming's Philosophy
- Notable works: The Collected Works of Master Ouyang Nanye 歐陽南野先生文集

Ouyang De
- Traditional Chinese: 歐陽德
- Simplified Chinese: 欧阳德
Transcriptions
Standard Mandarin
- Hanyu Pinyin: Ōuyáng Dé

Ouyang De (Note: Ouyang De used the courtesy name Chongyi (崇一) and the art name Nanye (南野).) (1496 – 24 April 1554) was a Chinese scholar-official and Neo-Confucian philosopher during the Ming dynasty. Born in Taihe County, Jiangxi, Ouyang passed the civil service examinations and attained the jinshi degree in 1523. He later served in several senior posts, including as minister of rites and chancellor of the Hanlin Academy. A disciple of philosopher Wang Yangming, he was particularly associated with the doctrine of liangzhi, or "innate knowledge of goodness". As one of Wang's senior disciples, he played an important role in introducing Wang's teachings to scholarly circles in Beijing, helping them gain wider acceptance among the elite in the 1550s.

== Biography ==
Ouyang De was born in 1496 during China's Ming dynasty, in Taihe County, Jiangxi Province. He studied Confucian classics and successfully passed the civil service examinations. In 1516, he passed the provincial examinations and in 1523, he passed the highest level, known as the palace examination, and was granted the rank of jinshi.

In 1526, Ouyang was appointed vice director of a bureau in the Ministry of Justice, but was soon transferred to the Hanlin Academy as a compiler. Five years later, he was promoted to director of studies at the Imperial University in Nanjing. He subsequently held a succession of official posts, being appointed as director of the Seal Office in Nanjing in 1535, vice director of the Court of the Imperial Stud in 1536, director of the Court of State Ceremonial in Nanjing in 1542, and director of the Court of Imperial Sacrifices in Nanjing in 1547. In 1550, he became vice minister of personnel and director of the Supervisorate of Imperial Instruction. That year, he was appointed chief examiner for the metropolitan examination, but soon left office to observe mourning for his mother. His official career reached its height in 1552, when he was promoted to minister of rites, a position he attained with the support of his friend and predecessor, Xu Jie, while simultaneously serving as chancellor of the Hanlin Academy. As minister of rites, Ouyang enhanced his reputation for courage and integrity through his repeated calls for the Jiajing Emperor to designate an heir, despite the Emperor's superstitious reservations about the matter. (Note: The Jiajing Emperor followed the advice of the Taoist priest Tao Zhongwen, who opposed him designating an heir, arguing that the presence of "two dragons"—the reigning emperor and his designated successor—might attract the spirits' jealousy and bring misfortune upon the heir. The Emperor was also reluctant to draw attention to his declining health by naming a successor while still in middle age.) He died two years later, on 24 April 1554, and was posthumously granted the rank of junior guardian of the heir apparent (太子少保) and the posthumous name Wenzhuang (文莊). In 1570, the court approved a request by officials in Jiangxi to hold annual sacrifices in his honor.

Ouyang studied Confucian philosophy under the guidance of Wang Yangming. He was particularly interested in the concept of liangzhi, which refers to innate knowledge of goodness. In his pursuit of liangzhi, he advocated for a balanced approach, avoiding extremes such as excessive meditation (as practiced by Luo Hongxian) or excessive activity. Ouyang believed that liangzhi was distinct from intention and perception, both of which he considered to be influenced by good and bad qualities. He also believed that liangzhi was separate from the principles of li and the nature of xing.

Among Wang's disciples, Ouyang held the highest official position, which played a crucial role in spreading Wang's teachings. In the 1520s, when Wang was not serving in government, he recruited hundreds of disciples in his home of Shaoxing to engage in debates on Confucian teachings. His disciples also actively promoted his ideas, particularly the concept of "innate knowledge of goodness", which directly challenged the official Zhuist orthodoxy. After Wang's death in 1529, his influence was primarily limited to the provinces of Zhejiang and Jiangxi. While his ideas were discussed in Nanjing, they were slow to gain acceptance. In Beijing, they were even less well received. It was not until the 1540s, when his disciples Zuo Shouyi, Qian Dehong, and Wang Ji were no longer serving in government and could focus on promoting Wang's ideas, that they were able to spread them more widely in the southern provinces. In contrast, Ouyang played a significant role in introducing debates on the "innate knowledge of goodness" in Beijing, where he held high positions in the Hanlin Academy and the Imperial University. In 1553–1554, he, along with Grand Secretary Xu Jie and others, organized a series of debates on teachings at the Lingji Gong Taoist monastery in Beijing, with thousands of literati and officials in attendance. This event was unprecedented and was not repeated in the following years. Ouyang successfully brought Wang's doctrine into the mainstream, and although only the Zhuist interpretation of Confucianism was required in the examinations, Wang's ideas gained acceptance among elite circles from the 1550s.

In 1556, Ouyang's disciple Wang Zongmu (王宗沐) published his work under the title The Collected Works of Master Ouyang Nanye (歐陽南野先生文集). Two years later, another of Ouyang's disciples, Liang Rukui (梁汝魁), arranged for the work to be reprinted in Shanxi.
