= Viceroys in China =

Governor-generals for regional affairs in Ming and Qing China

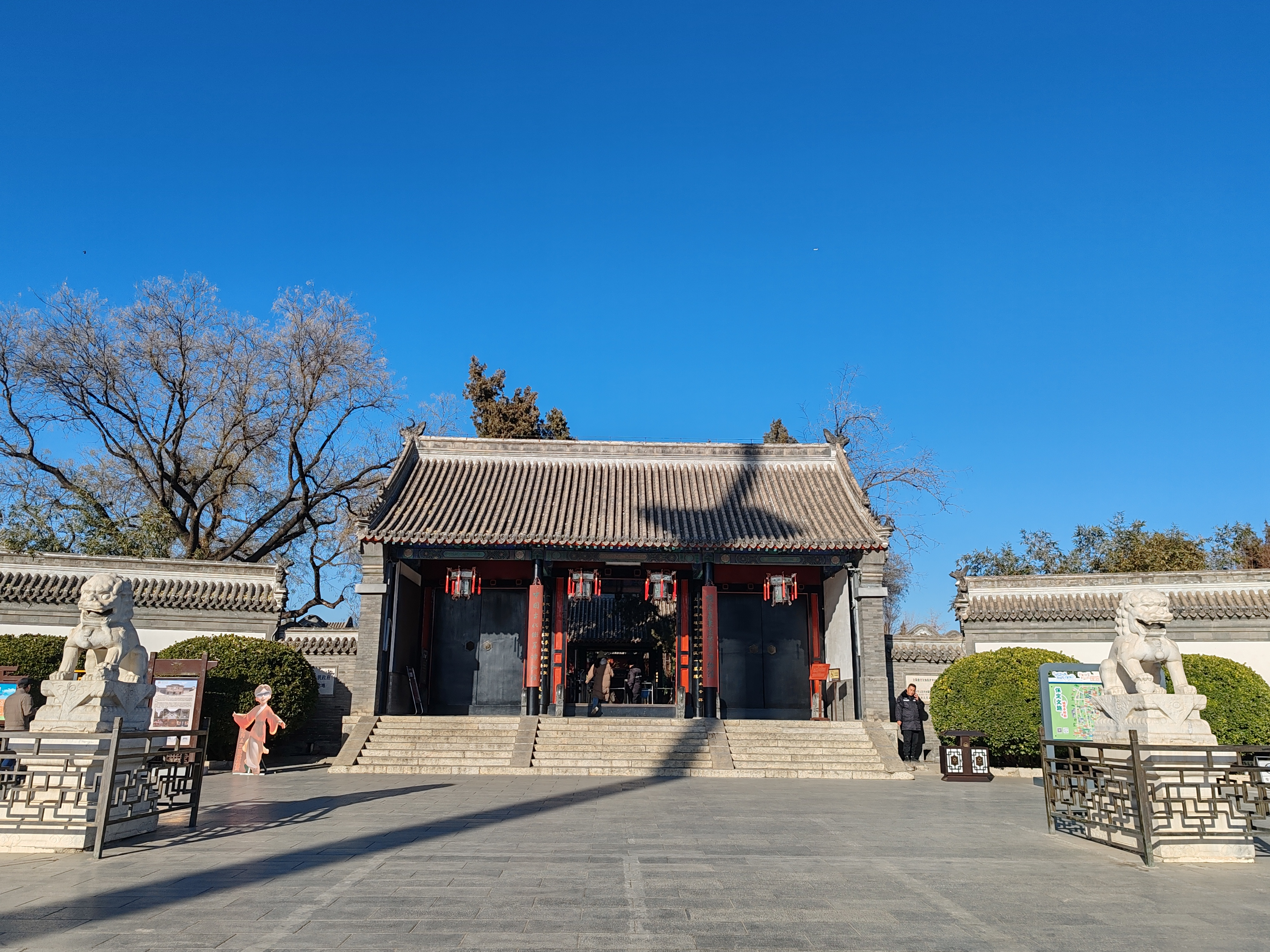
The office of Viceroy of Zhili in Baoding, Hebei. Viceroy of Zhili was the most prominent officer in China's regional jurisdiction system, due to its adjacent location to Beijing.

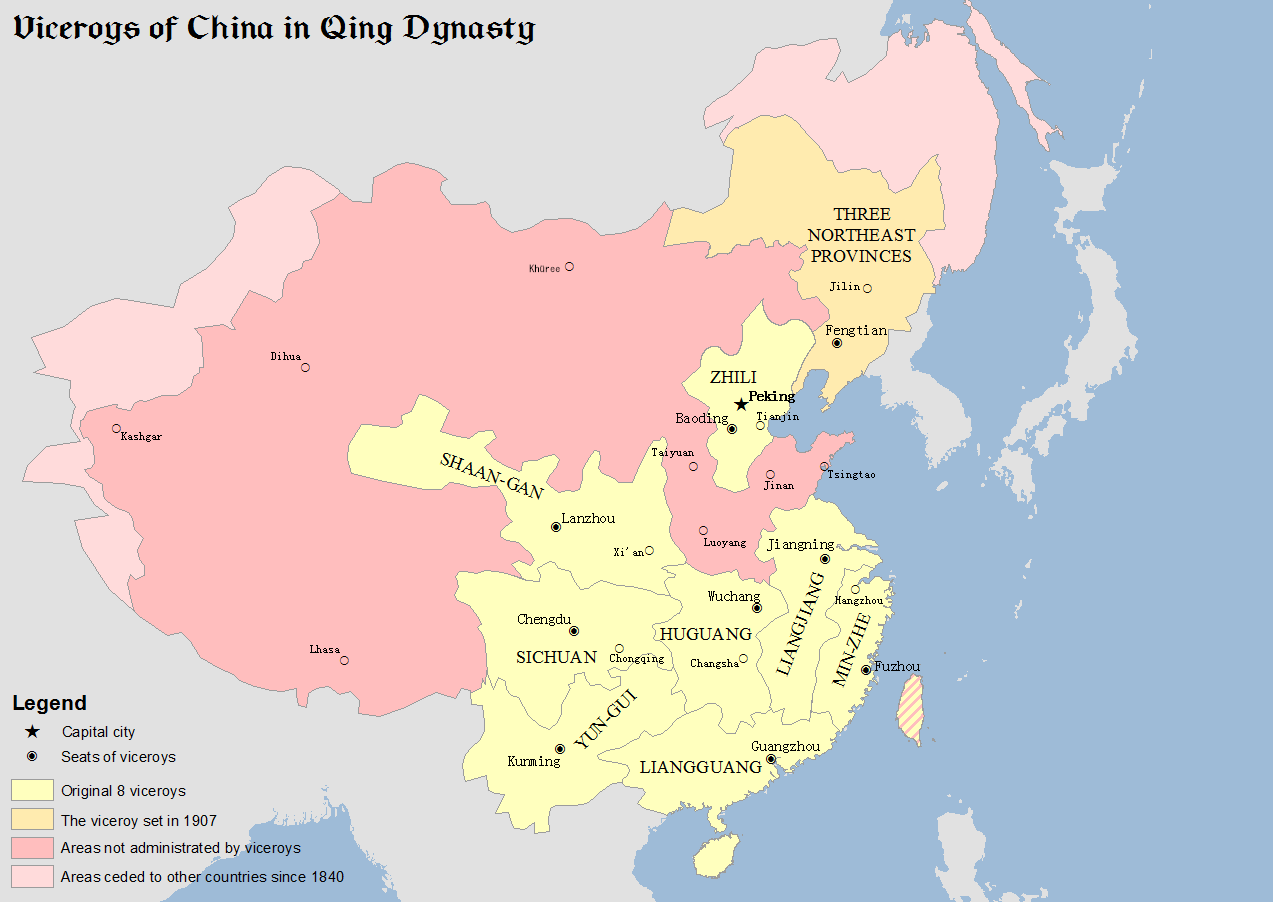
Map of viceroys in Qing dynasty of China

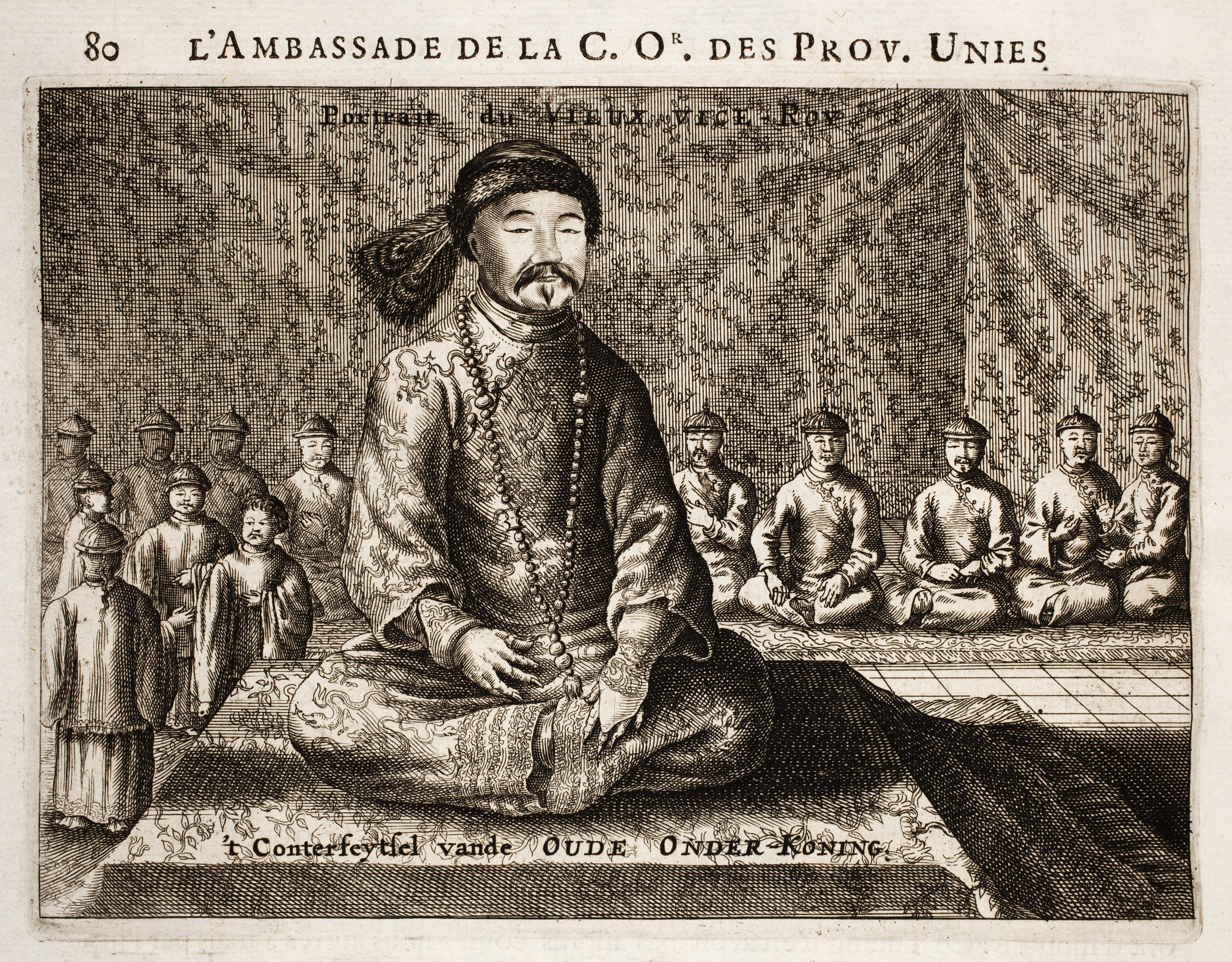
Shang Kexi, known to the Dutch as the "Old Viceroy" of Guangdong, drawn by Johan Nieuhof in 1655

Zongdu (Tsung-tu; simplified Chinese: 总督; traditional Chinese: 總督; pinyin: Zǒngdū; Wade–Giles: Tsung^{3}-tu^{1}; lit. 'Overall Supervisor'; Manchu: ᠤᠾᠡᠷᠢ
ᠺᠠᠯᠠᠳᠠᠷᠠ
ᠠᠮᠪᠠᠨ; usually translated as Governor-General or Viceroy) were high-level officials responsible for overseeing the governors of several provinces in Ming and Qing China. One viceroy usually administered several provinces and was in charge of all affairs of military, food, wages, rivers, and provincial governors within their region of jurisdiction. Viceroys were appointed by and directly reported to the Emperor.

One of the most important was the Viceroy of Zhili (Chihli), since it encompassed the imperial capital. Yuan Shikai, later President of Republican China, held this office.

== Ming dynasty ==
Zhu Yuanzhang, the founding emperor of the Ming dynasty (1368 AD to 1644 AD), continued the provincial system of the Yuan dynasty but separated Xingsheng into 13 Cheng Xuan Bu Zheng Shi Si, aimed to spread the central government policies. However, later the Ming government found out they needed a coordinator to deal with the conflict between several provinces or suppress rebellion.

The viceroy system began in 1441, the 6th year of Zhengtong period, when the minister of war was assigned to cope with the rebellion in Yunnan. From the late 15th century, the Ming central viceroys were assigned with increasing frequency. In the 5th year of Chenghua emperor (1469 AD), the viceroy of Liangguang (Guangdong and Guangxi) was assigned permanently.

Only the secretary of the Grand Council can be appointed to be a viceroy. In the 8th year of Zhengde emperor (1510 AD), the viceroy of Xuanda was appointed to defend the Great Wall against annual Northern Yuan Mongol invasions.

In 1550 AD, the 33rd year Jiajing emperor, viceroy of Zhezhi was set up to cope the threat from the Japanese wokou.

When it came to the 1600s, the Manchu rose from the northeast of China, Nurhaci, the khan of Later Jin, announced his rebellion against the Ming dynasty in the 1610. In 1626, the 6th year of Tianqi, in the Battle of Ningyuan, Yuan Chonghuan defeated Nurhaci and defended Ningyuan from the Manchu. Nurhaci would die several months later. Yuan Chonghuan was in succession to become viceroy of Jiliao. As Yuan Chonghuan defended Ningyuan and Jinzhou from the Manchu invasion for many times, Hong Taiji, the following khan of Nurhaci, bypassed Ningyuan and Jinzhou and broke through the Great Wall and reached the capital.

In 1630 the 3rd year of Chongzhen era, Yuan was arrested for betraying the Ming dynasty and sentenced to death. Before his death, Yuan wrote a poem:

"A life's work always ends up in vain; half of my career seems to be in dreams. I do not worry about lacking brave warriors after my death, for my loyal spirit will continue to guard Liaodong."

In the same time, the viceroy of Shaan-Gan, Hong Chengchou, was assigned to deal with the peasant uprising headed by Gao Yingxiang (Chuang King) and Li Zicheng (General Chuang later inherited Gao's nickname and his forces) in northwest China. In order to suppress the peasant uprising, the Ming government set up the viceroy of five provinces including Henan, Shanxi, Shaanxi, Huguang and Sichuan, Lu Xiangsheng was appointed to it and soon defeated Gao Yingxiang and his 300,000 troops with just an army of 20,000. Before Lu could suppress all the remains of peasant uprising, he was appointed to be the viceroy of Xuanda to protect the north border of the empire to defend against the Manchus. In 1638, the 11th year of Chongzhen, Lu died for his country in the battle against the Manchus after facing a case of food shortage for seven days.

Some people believe the death of the Ming dynasty was sealed after Hong Chengchou, the viceroy of Jiliao during 1639 and 1641, failed the Battle of Song-Jin and lost nearly half of Ming's army. Though Hong Chengchou was highly regarded by Chongzhen emperor, he surrendered to the Qing. In 1644, the last emperor of Ming, Chongzhen emperor Zhu Youjian hanged himself in Beijing outside the Forbidden city when Li Zicheng marched into Beijing.

== Qing dynasty ==
=== List of viceroys ===
The regional viceroys, along with subordinate provinces, during the Qing dynasty were:

- Viceroy of Zhili: Zhili
- Viceroy of Liangjiang: Jiangsu, Jiangxi, Anhui
- Viceroy of Min-Zhe: Fujian, Zhejiang, Taiwan
- Viceroy of Huguang: Hunan, Hubei
- Viceroy of Shaan-Gan: Shaanxi, Gansu
- Viceroy of Liangguang: Guangdong, Guangxi
- Viceroy of Yun-Gui: Yunnan, Guizhou
- Viceroy of Sichuan: Sichuan
- Viceroy of the Three Eastern Provinces: Fengtian, Jilin, Heilongjiang

Chinese historians often rank the Viceroy of Zhili as the most honorable and powerful, and the Viceroy of Liangjiang as the richest of the eight. Certain provinces were not governed by any regional viceroys. These included the provinces of Shanxi, Shandong and Henan.

Besides the regional viceroys, there were also special types of viceroys, such as Viceroy of Southern Rivers and Viceroy of Eastern Rivers, who were in charge of waterways.

=== Early Qing dynasty ===
The Qing dynasty effectively inherited the late Ming system, wherein viceroys combined both military and civilian powers over one or more provinces. While the regularly-appointed Ming viceroys were concentrated on the northern border, against the military threat of the Mongols and Manchus, the Qing dynasty extended the system into other regions in China as well.

The early ruler of Qing dynasty (1644 AD to 1912 AD) basically followed the system of Ming dynasty and established stable provincial boundaries. They created 18 provinces and two or three of them formed the jurisdiction of a viceroy. Unlike Ming, viceroys in Qing dynasty were created according to the military expansion progress (Guy, R, 2010). In 1649, the 5th year of Shunzhi emperor, the viceroy of Zhili was established to strengthen their control to both Zhili, Shandong and Henan. In the meantime, due to the remain threat of Ming dynasty from southwest China, Hong Chengchou was assigned to be the viceroy of Yungui, Huguang and Liangguang, in his term of office, he massacred many people who refused to bend knees to Qing dynasty, additionally, the last emperor of Southern Ming dynasty, Yongli emperor Zhu Youlang, was cast into Myanmar and finally be executed by Pingxi Prince Wu Sangui. After Qing eliminating the remain of Ming dynasty on mainland China, the central government wanted to reduce their power of the Three Feudatories. The viceroy of Yungui, Gan Wenkun, was arranged to take Pingxi Prince Wu Sangui down but was captured and killed when Wu Sangui announced his rebellion to Qing along with other two princes, the Revolt of the Three Feudatories began. After Qing suppresses Wu's rebellion, Kangxi emperor finally tries to take the other remainder of Ming, the Kingdom of Tungning, the viceroy of Minzhe Yao Qisheng and General Shilang finished the task in 1683, the 22nd year of Kangxi emperor (Peterson, Willard J., 2016).

=== Late Qing dynasty ===
In 1840, after the viceroy of Liangguang, Lin Zexu eliminated opium imported to China by British businessmen. The British Council declared war to China and the Opium War broke out. After centuries of locking boundaries and officers' unwilling to promote navy's force. Qing's navy failed to Confront with the British steam warship and British army marched towards Nanjing and forced the viceroy of Liangjiang Keying to sign Treaty of Nanking, in this treaty, Qing paid six million silver dollars to Britain, open other four trading points and ceding Hong Kong to Britain (Fairbank, John K., and Kwang-Ching Liu, 1980). Due to the defeat of the first Opium war, conflict between Manchu and Han and population of Qing dynasty has reached its peak, leading to the increase of the Taiping Rebellion based on Christian belief in the year 1850.

At the beginning, the corrupt Green Standard Army and Eight Banners cannot fight against the leader of the rebellion Hong Xiuquan and also cannot stop Hong from forming Taiping Heavenly Kingdom. To cope with the rebellion, the Qing government assigned Zeng Guofan as the viceroy of Liangjiang and trained a new army, Xiang army, to help them, in the meantime, it is the first time that the number of Han viceroys exceeds that from Manchu, shows the fall of Qing's central power (Fairbank, Jokn King, 1978). Zuo Zongtang, another founder of Xiang army, together with Zeng Guoquan, the younger brother of Zeng Guofan and the viceroy of Liangjiang finally took the capital of Taiping Heavenly Kingdom Nanjing and captured Hong Tianguifu, the Taiping Heavenly Kingdom's adolescent emperor son of Hong Xiuquan, putting an end to the uprising (Michael and Zhang, 1971). After that, in 1868, Zuo was assigned to be the viceroy of Shaan Gan and put down another rebellion in North China, the Nian rebellion. During the 1870s, Zuo led 120,000 Xiang army, equipped with many advanced weapons, to crush the Muslim rebels in the northeast of China. In 1878, Zuo Zongtang marched to Xinjiang to take down Yakub Beg's rebel and expel Russian intruder from Ili city. Nevertheless, Zuo was also one of the founders of Western Affairs Movement, He built the Fuzhou Naval College and Mawei Arsenal in Fuzhou to learn western advanced equipment when he was the viceroy of MinZhe. According to Fairbank&Jokn King (1978), another founder of Western Affairs Movement is the viceroy of Zhili, Li Hongzhang, who created Huai army to support the role of Qing government during the Taiping rebellion he was also the student of Zeng Guofan.

In 1886, after the Sino-French War, he realized the necessity to train a powerful army and fleet to support Qing dynasty, due to this he created Beiyang Fleet the strongest fleet in East Asia. Eight years after, in order to protect Qing's tributary state Korea from the invasion of Japan, Qing declare war to Japan, Li was chosen to lead army to defend Korea. However, because of the corruption in Qing dynasty and the inherent defects of feudal system Qing lost the war and Li had to sign the treaty of Shimonoseki. In this treaty, Qing was to pay Japan 200 million taels (8,000,000 kg (18,000,000 lb)) of silver as war reparations and ceded LiaoDong Peninsula, Taiwan and its affiliated islands and PengHu islands (Rowe, 2012). Due to his loss, Li was demoted as the viceroy of Liang Guang. In the 1900s, when army of eight foreign countries marched Beijing, the Han viceroys of southeast China remain neutral and still protest against the Empress Dowager (New York Times, 1900). To negotiate with these foreigners, Li Hongzhang was arranged to be the principal Chinese negotiator to sign the Xin Chou Treaty (Boxer Protocol). During the First Sino-Japanese War, the Empress Dowager Cixi found general Yuan Shikai faithful to the royal family. In the Wuxu Reform, yuan was the first one to protect Empress Dowager Cixi and arrest reform's chief Tan Sitong, Liang Qichao and others and finally executed six of them. After all this events, Yuan finally replaced Li Hongzhang as the viceroy of ZhiLi after Li died in 1901.

In the early 1900s, as Fairbank & Jokn King (1978) cited, Yuan was asked to form a new army Beiyang army to protect Qing dynasty, which was regarded as the largest and best trained army in China (Schillinger, Nicolas 2016). According to Busky (2002), Yuan was relieved of all his posts and retired to his homeland in 1908, before his retirement he was recognised as the most powerful man in China (Douglas Story, 1907). In 1904, the viceroy of Liangjiang, Zhang Zhidong, planned to build the yellow river conservancy by himself and cast aside the central government (New York Times, 1904). The decadent of the central government power became more obvious in the late Qing dynasty, when the Wuchang uprising took place on October 11, 1911, Beiyang army refused to follow Qing government's order but asking Yuan's return. Yuan believed time was on his side, so he rejected court's order many times until he was satisfied. When he finally agreed to suppress rebellion, almost half of China was out of control of Qing's rule, realizing this situation, Yuan arranged for the abdication of the child emperor Puyi in return for being granted the position of President of the Republic of China.
