= Nanzhili (Ming province) =

Historical province of the Ming dynasty

Nanzhili 南直隸
- Province of the Ming dynasty
- 1403–1644
- Capital: Nanjing
- History
  - Established: 1403
  - Disestablished: 1644
- Today part of: China; Jiangsu; Anhui; Shanghai

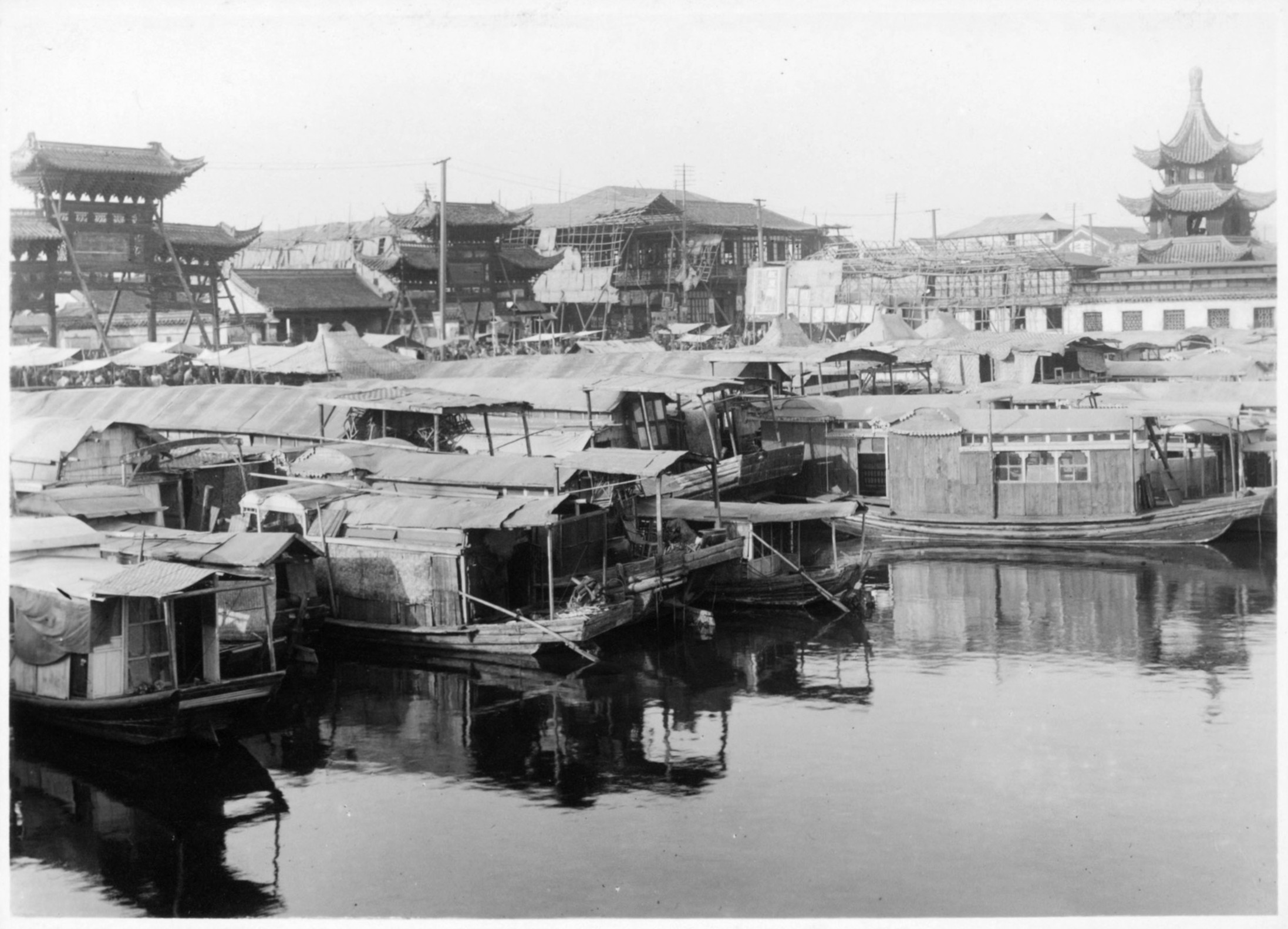
The Qinhuai River in Nanjing, which served as the administrative center of Nanzhili during the Ming dynasty.

Nanzhili, formerly romanized as Nan-chih-li and also known as South or Southern Zhili or Chih-li, was a historical province of the Ming dynasty. It combined areas of the Yuan provinces of Henan Jiangbei and Jiangzhe and took its name (lit. "Southern Directly Administered Area") from Nanjing's status as one of the Ming dynasty's capitals.

Due to Nanjing being the capital, the Ming dynasty exempted the surrounding region from the standard administrative hierarchy of provinces, prefectures, and counties. Instead, Nanzhili and its northern equivalent, Beizhili (headquartered in Beijing), functioned as unique administrative zones. Neither region was overseen by a provincial governor; local administrators reported straight to the central government ministries in the capital.

In 1644, at the beginning of the Qing dynasty, the name of Nanzhili was changed to Jiangnan.

== See also ==
- Beizhili (Ming province)

== Sources ==
- Naquin, Susan (2000). Peking: Temples and City Life, 1400–1900. University of California Press. ISBN 978-0-520-21991-5.
- Zhang, Yingpin (2005). 明代南直隶方志研究 [Researches in Nanzhili Local History of Ming Dynasty] (in Chinese). Beijing: Social Sciences Academic Press. ISBN 7801908155.
