= Rada (disambiguation) =

Rada is a council in several Slavic countries. Rada or RADA may also refer to:

== People ==
- Rada (surname)
- Rada (given name)

== Places ==
- Råda, Sweden, a locality
- Rada, West Virginia, United States, an unincorporated community
- Rada Peak, Ellsworth Land, Antarctica

== Science and technology ==
- RadA protein, a recombinase from Archaea homologous to the eukaryotic RAD51 protein
- RADA (Radius Authenticated Device Access), 3Com's proprietary extension of 802.1x authentication
- RADA (Remote Access Discovery Agent), a type of device in the UPnP specification

== Other uses ==
- Royal Academy of Dramatic Art (RADA), a drama school in London
- Verkhovna Rada, The Supreme Council of Ukraine
- Rada TV, an official television channel of the Ukrainian parliament
- Rada Manufacturing, a United States-based manufacturer of cutlery
- RADA Electronic Industries, an Israeli defence electronics company
- Rajaka, or Rada, a Sri Lankan caste
- Rada (drum), a drum used in the music of Haiti
- Rada (fiqh): a concept from Islamic jurisprudence
- Rada lwa, a family of spirits in Haitian Voduo
- Trinidadian Vodunu
- RADA Special Deterrence Forces a Madkhali radical Islamist military police unit in Tripoli Libya

== See also ==
- Rada'a District, Yemen
  - Citadel of Rada'a
- Radda (disambiguation)
