= Lu Tang =

- Traditional Chinese: 盧鏜
- Simplified Chinese: 卢镗
Transcriptions
Standard Mandarin
- Hanyu Pinyin: Lú Tāng
- Wade–Giles: Lo T'ang

Ziming (courtesy name)
- Traditional Chinese: 子鳴
- Simplified Chinese: 子鸣
Transcriptions
Standard Mandarin
- Hanyu Pinyin: Zǐmíng
- Wade–Giles: Tzu-ming

Lu Tang (c. 1520 – c. 1570), courtesy name Ziming, was an army officer of the Ming dynasty in China. He participated in the suppression of the Jiajing wokou raids from 1547 to 1562, during which he fought the Portuguese smugglers who settled in pirate havens on the outlying islands of the Chinese coast. The Portuguese called him Luthissi, a combination of his surname Lu and the position he held, "dusi" (都司), or regional military commander. As a seasoned general, Lu Tang was a skilled strategist but suffered many setbacks on the battlefield. His career was not only affected by his military fortunes, but also the fates of the numerous commanders that he served.

== Raze of Shuangyu ==
A native of Runing, Henan, Lu Tang began his career by inheriting a minor military position from his father. By 1548, he rose to the post of Regional Military Commander (都指揮僉事) of Fujian, where he gained the confidence of the Zhejiang grand coordinator Zhu Wan. On 15 April 1548, Zhu Wan ordered Lu Tang and Ke Qiao (柯喬) to lead a fleet from Wenzhou to attack the pirate haven Shuangyu, which was being used as a trading post by Chinese pirates and merchants from Japan and Portugal. The fleet descended onto Shuangyu one night in June, under the cover of thick weather. Fifty-five to a few hundred smugglers perished, but the lieutenants such as Li Guangtou (李光頭) and Wang Zhi were able to escape. Lu Tang then razed the town and rendered the harbour permanently unusable by filling it in with stones under Zhu Wan's orders. Zhu Wan and his generals were greatly rewarded in silver for the victory, but they also drew the ire of his political enemies among the gentry, whose profits were directly affected by the destruction of Shuangyu.

== The Zoumaxi affair ==
After the loss of Shuangyu, the smugglers scattered along the coast of Zhejiang and Fujian to find good hideouts to trade. The deep water inlet of Zoumaxi (走馬溪, "Running Horse Creek") by the Dongshan Peninsula near the Fujian-Guangdong border was found to be a suitable place for trade since the terrain sheltered the ships from the winds. On 19 March 1549, Lu Tang and Ke Qiao ambushed two junks in Zoumaxi while the smugglers were trading with the Portuguese aboard. Lu and Ke lured the Portuguese guards away from the junks by feigning to attack from the shore, then set upon the junks the Ming fleet previously hidden behind a promontory. The junks were captured after a brief and feeble resistance, resulting in 33 deaths and 206 smugglers captured. Among the captured were Li Guangtou and a number of Portuguese men, and Lu Tang had four of the more good-looking Portuguese pretend to be kings of Malacca in order to make the victory seem more complete. Fearing that the captives might bribe their way out, Zhu Wan executed 96 of the Chinese smugglers using his discretionary powers. The Portuguese record of this incident by the crewman Galeote Pereira allege that Lu Tang, Ke Qiao, and possibly Zhu Wan exaggerated their victory in hopes of being rewarded with the goods they found on the junks, and killed the Chinese crew to prevent the ruse of the "Malaccan" kings from being exposed.

On April 27, Zhu Wan was impeached for exceeding his authority since executions had to be sanctioned by the emperor. The Jiajing Emperor dismissed Zhu Wan from his post and ordered a full investigation on the matter. Seeing that the odds were against him, Zhu Wan committed suicide by drinking poison in January 1550. The investigation uncovered the ruse of the "Malaccan" kings, so Lu Tang and Ke Qiao were put in prison and condemned to death for their part in the affair, while the Portuguese smugglers were exiled to Guizhou.

== Later career ==
The death of Zhu Wan was followed by the wholesale reversion of his policies. For three years the position held by Zhu Wan remained vacant, and the wokou raiders took full advantage of the military vacuum. In 1552, the Grand Coordinator of Shandong Wang Yu (王忬) was summoned to take Zhu Wan's old grand coordinator position in Zhejiang in the face of the escalating wokou crisis. As grand coordinator, Wang Yu released Lu Tang and Ke Qiao from prison to make use of their experience against the wokou. However, Wang Yu's armies suffered repeated defeats during his tenure, while Lu Tang also suffered military defeats against the pirates off the coast of Zhejiang in 1554. For this, Wang Yu and Lu Tang were sacked from office for their failure.

A short time later, Lu Tang was recalled to serve under Zhang Jing, the new supreme commander of the six coastal provinces from Shandong to Guangxi. He was put in charge of the Miao troops from Baojing, and won a spectacular victory at Wangjiangjing (王江涇) in May 1555 with the generals Yu Dayou and Tang Kekuan (湯克寬). Later in September that year he captured the pirate chief Lin Bichuan (林碧川). He continued fighting in the field despite his superiors being replaced three times over two years, and finally came to serve under a supreme commander stable in his position, Hu Zongxian.

Under Hu Zongxian, Lu Tang participated in the suppression of the raid of 1556, where he won a decisive victory in Taizhou south of Ningbo and helped defeat and kill the ringleader Xu Hai at the Shen Family Estate (沈家莊) in late September. He also took an active part in Hu's plan to capture the most powerful pirate lord Wang Zhi, cooking up schemes such as using the offer of free trade to induce Wang to surrender, and attempting to turn Wang's Japanese collaborators against him. Eventually, Wang Zhi surrendered in 1557 and was executed in 1559. However, Lu Tang was impeached for simply chasing the pirates away from the coast instead of annihilating them. He was briefly demoted, but was reinstated in his post of regional commander of the Southern Metropolitan Region (Nanzhili) and Zhejiang (江浙副總兵) through the influence of Tang Shunzhi, the vice director of the bureau of operations. In addition, Lu Tang was finally recognized for his role in the capture of Wang Zhi, and was promoted in rank to vice commissioner-in-chief of the central military commission (都督同知).

When Hu Zongxian was charged with corruption in December 1562, Lu Tang was also implicated. He was stripped of his commissions but was otherwise unpunished. Lu Tang returned to his home village and little is known about his later activities.
