= Shuangyu =

Historical smuggling port in China

Coordinates: 29.73°N 122.10°E

- Traditional Chinese: 雙嶼
- Simplified Chinese: 双屿
- Literal meaning: Double Island
Transcriptions
Standard Mandarin
- Hanyu Pinyin: Shuāngyǔ
- Wade–Giles: Shuang1-yü3

Shuangyu (Chinese: 雙嶼; pinyin: Shuāngyǔ; lit. 'Double Island') was a port on Liuheng Island (六橫島) off the coast of Zhejiang, China. During the 16th century, the port served as an illegal entrepôt of international trade, attracting traders from Japan, Southeast Asia, and Portugal in a time when private overseas trade was banned by China's ruling Ming dynasty. Portuguese sources called the place Liampó, taking the name of the nearby city of Ningbo on the mainland. Shuangyu's days as a smuggling hub and pirate haven began as early as 1524 and lasted until its destruction by the Ming navy in 1548, an event that was greatly exaggerated (and wrongly dated) by the 16th-century Portuguese travel writer Fernão Mendes Pinto.

== Illegal trade in the 16th century ==
In the 16th century, a global demand for Chinese products like silk and porcelain coincided with a high demand of silver in China. However, the premier suppliers of silver in East Asia, the Japanese and the Portuguese, could not legally trade in China to meet the massive demand. At the same time, Chinese merchants were prevented from trading with foreigners due to the Ming dynasty's maritime prohibition laws. To conduct private trade in China, the Japanese and Portuguese traders collaborated with smugglers on island ports along the Zhejiang and Fujian coast. Among these ports, Shuangyu emerged as the primary emporium of clandestine trade, since it was at a reasonable distance from the markets of Ningbo and Hangzhou, but also sufficiently far away from the Ming coast authorities.

The earliest mentions of Shuangyu as a smuggling port notes that the chaos on the Zhejiang coast (a reference to the Ningbo incident of 1523) caused an overstocking of commodities at Shuangyu in 1524. At first, Shuangyu only had temporary mat-sheds for the smugglers to house themselves and their goods during the trading season. In 1539, Fujianese traders started to guide foreign traders from Patani and Malacca to barter in Shuangyu and started to occupy the island. They were soon joined by the Fujianese merchants Jinzi Lao (金子老, "Gold Elder") and Li Guangtou (李光頭, "Baldy Li"), who led the Portuguese and assorted adventurers to Shuangyu. Attracted by the growing trade on the Zhejiang coast, the syndicate led by Xu Dong (許棟) and his brothers moved their base of operations from the Malay Peninsula to Shuangyu. The existing clout of the Xu syndicate and its close partnership with the Portuguese made it the foremost smuggling bloc by 1542 after a series of mergers among the merchant-pirates in Shuangyu.

The Ming authorities began to clamp down on smuggling in 1543, viewing such activities in the same vein as wokou piracy. However, the Xu syndicate was able to repulse these initial Ming attacks on Shuangyu with the aid of Portuguese firearms. Hardened by their victories against the Ming navy, the smugglers expanded their network of activities down the coast of China all the way to Guangdong and inland to the metropolis of Nanjing, with Shuangyu being their hub. In 1544, this network was further expanded when the Japan-based merchant Wang Zhi joined the Xu syndicate, bringing along his Japanese connections to Shuangyu. Thus Shuangyu reached its zenith as the biggest entrépot in maritime East Asia trading goods from Europe and Asia. On the eve of its destruction, Shuangyu had an estimated population of 600 "Wo barbarians", a term that referred to the Japanese but might have also included other foreigners at the time.

At Shuangyu's height of prosperity, local residents of Shuangyu willingly aided the pirates, since the smuggling trade brought considerable wealth to the island. The villagers, who previously relied on subsistence agriculture and fishing to make a living, turned to making weapons and armour for Wang Zhi and other pirates of the area: "[They] melted copper coins to make shot, used saltpeter to make gunpowder, iron to make swords and guns, and leather to make their armour." Their admiration for the pirates was such that not only did they provide the pirates with daily necessities, they also gave women and pledged their own children. Many youngsters willingly joined Wang Zhi's group. As for the Portuguese in the Shuangyu settlement, the friar Gaspar da Cruz wrote that they were "so firmly settled and with such freedom, that nothing was lacking them save having a gallows and pelourinho", a freedom that they and their Chinese accomplices sometimes abused when they "make great thefts and robberies, and killed some of the people."

== Destruction ==
In 1547, the Ming court appointed the veteran general Zhu Wan as the Grand Coordinator of Zhejiang to deal with the illicit trade and piratical activities centred at Shuangyu. On 15 April 1548, Zhu Wan's fleet in Wenzhou set sail for Shuangyu under the command of Lu Tang and Ke Qiao (柯喬). The fleet descended onto Shuangyu one night in June, under the cover of thick weather. Twenty-seven vessels were sunk and 55 to a few hundred smugglers perished during the attack. Many were captured alive, including two Japanese, though the leading figures of the settlement like Li Guangtou and Wang Zhi were able to escape with the help of the summer monsoon winds. Lu Tang then razed the town and rendered the harbour permanently unusable by filling it in with stones under Zhu Wan's orders. Even so, in the immediate aftermath, the locals still tried to preserve Shuangyu as a smuggling base, with the observation post at Dinghai reportedly sighting 1,290 ships heading towards Shuangyu in one day.

Chinese sources do not mention Portuguese captives or casualties from the attack on Shuangyu, in contrast to Fernão Mendes Pinto's claim in his semi-fictitious Peregrinação that several thousand Christians, among them 800 Portuguese, were slaughtered. Mendes Pinto also incorrectly placed the destruction of "Liampó" in 1542. Recent research tends to dismiss Pinto's description of the "blood-bath" as an exaggeration or a fabrication, and suggests that only a small number of Portuguese were caught in the Shuangyu incident. In any case, news of Shuangyu's fall was relayed to Portuguese India with the warning that "the ports of China were all up in arms against the Portuguese", and the Portuguese gradually stopped trading in Zhejiang and went south to Fujian and Guangdong.

== See also ==
- Jiajing wokou raids
- Yuegang
