= Rada (surname) =

Rada (Czech feminine: Radová) and de Rada (the latter of possibly Spanish origin) is a surname. Notable people with the surname include:

- Alfredo Rada (born 1965), Bolivian former government minister
- Antonio Rada (1937–2014), Colombian footballer
- Dino Rađa (born 1967), Croatian basketball player
- Edmundo Rada (disappeared 2019), Venezuelan politician
- Ester Rada (born 1985), Israeli actress and singer
- Filip Rada (born 1984), Czech footballer
- Ionuț Rada (footballer, born 1982), Romanian footballer
- Ionuț Rada (footballer, born 1990), Romanian footballer
- Irena Radová (born 1975), Czech classical philologist
- Jakub Rada (born 1987), Czech footballer
- Julieta Rada (born 1990), Uruguayan-Argentine singer and songwriter
- Karel Rada (born 1971), Czech footballer
- Lenka Radová (born 1979), Czech triathlete
- Lucila Rada (born 1981), Argentine-Uruguayan singer and songwriter
- Marian Rada (born 1960), Romanian footballer
- Miroslav Rada, Czech footballer
- Nelson Rada (born 2005), Venezuelan baseball player
- Petr Rada (born 1958), Czech football coach and player
- Roy Rada (born 1951), American computer scientist
- Rubén Rada (1943–2026), Uruguayan candombe singer
- Sergio Rada (born 1984), Colombian weightlifter
- Tereza Radová (born 2001), Czech ice hockey player
- Tomáš Rada (born 1983), Czech footballer
- Yara Bou Rada (born 2000), Lebanese footballer
- Jeronim de Rada (1814–1903), Albanian-Italian poet and writer
- Martín de Rada (1533–1578), Spanish Augustinian friar, missionary and traveler
- Rodrigo Jiménez de Rada (1170–1247), Spanish Roman Catholic bishop and historian

== See also ==
- Murder of Tair Rada, murder of 13-year-old Israeli schoolgirl
