= Galeote Pereira =

Portuguese soldier

Galeote Pereira (sometimes also Galiote Pereira) was a 16th-century Portuguese soldier of fortune. He spent several years in China's Fujian and Guangxi province after being captured by the Chinese authorities in an anti-smuggling operation. The report he wrote after escaping China is one of the earliest known accounts by a westerner of life in Ming China; indeed, it is the first detailed observation of that civilisation by a lay (non-clerical) European visitor since that of Marco Polo.

== Biography ==
Pereira and other Portuguese mercenaries helped defend the Siamese Ayutthaya Kingdom against the invading army of King Tabinshwehti of Pegu in the Burmese–Siamese War (1548–49), introducing Early Modern warfare to the region.

Pereira engaged in smuggling along the Ming Empire's South China Sea coast, for which enterprise one notorious centre was the Taishan islet of Wuyu in Xiamen Bay. He was aboard one of the two Portuguese junks seized in March 1549 near the Dongshan Peninsula during the Pirate Extermination Campaign of the Jiajing Emperor, which was actively carried out by Fujian's grand coordinator Zhu Wan. Luckily not among the crew members executed extrajudicially, Pereira and others were incarcerated at Fuzhou.

During and subsequent to his trial, the detainees were taken out "many times ... and were brought to the palaces of noblemen to be seen of them and their wives", which allowed Pereira to see something of Fuzhou. Fortunately for Pereira and other surviving Portuguese (and their companions, coming from various parts of the Portuguese colonial empire in Asia), Zhu Wan's enemy at the imperial court learned of the irregularities involved in the execution of the prisoners and the handling of captured merchandise; censors arrived from Beijing, a number of officials were removed from their positions and punished; Zhu Wan himself committed suicide. The Portuguese prisoners waiting for the end of their lives in Fuzhou's prison were dispatched to live out their sentences of separate internal exile, in various locations around Guilin, Guizhou.

With the help of the Portuguese merchants in Canton, many of the exiles managed to make their way by bribery and stealth back to the sea coast and to Portuguese ships and off-shore bases. Pereira was one of these escapees. It is known that in mid-February 1553, he was already in the Shangchuan Island, assisting at the exhumation of the incorrupt remains of Francis Xavier.

== Pereira's story ==
Several of the Portuguese survivors of the 1549 incident and the subsequent imprisonment and exile wrote accounts of their experiences. The first of them was published as early as 1555. However, Galeote Pereira's is considered the most complete, and is the best known.

It is not known when Pereira first wrote his account. While C. R. Boxer surmised that Pereira may have penned his recollections soon after his escape to safety, the earliest known manuscript of his notes dates to 1561. It is a copy made by Indian pupils of the Jesuit Saint Paul's College in Goa, and sent to one of the Jesuits' central offices in Europe. While the original Portuguese text, entitled "Algũas cousas sabidas da China ..." ("Some things known about China ...") was not published at the time, its (slightly abridged) Italian translation appeared in Venice in 1565 in a book containing a number of other reports sent by Jesuits from India. An English translation of that Italian text, made by a former English Jesuit Richard Willes was printed in 1577, in the History of Travayle in the West and East Indies, under the title "Certain reports of the province China, learned through the Portugals there imprisoned, and chiefly by the relation of Galeote Pereira, a gentleman of good credit, that lay prisoner in that country many years. Done out of Italian by R.W.". Willes' translation was reprinted a number of times.

A complete English translation of the original (i.e., the earliest known to us) Portuguese manuscript was made by Boxer and published in 1953 in Archivum Historicum Societatis Iesu, vol. XXII, pp. 63–92. The original Portuguese text has since been published in Portugal, and in vol. 153 of Archivum Historicum Societatis Iesu in Rome.

Published accounts of other Portuguese prisoners captured together with Pereira include the letter of Afonso Ramiro, sent from Wuzhou to the Portuguese base at Langbaijiao in 1555.

=== Content of the report ===
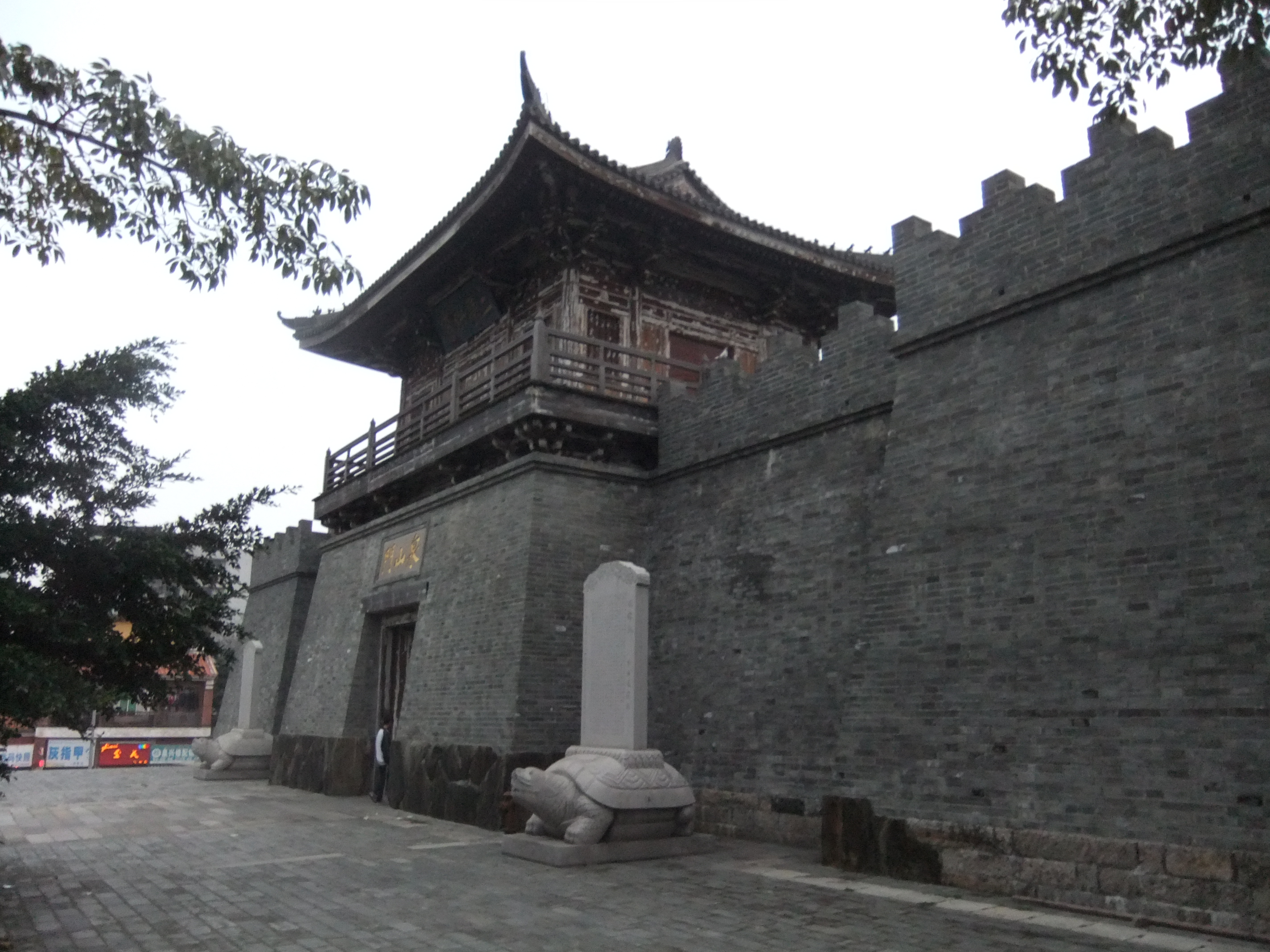
The restored Quanshan Gate of Quanzhou. Pereira and his fellow prisoners may have been carried through (an earlier incarnation of) this gate on their way to Fuzhou.

The organization of Pereira's account is somewhat chaotic: it is neither a strictly chronological account describing a chain of events (a "travelogue" or "memoir"), nor a treatise describing various aspects of China in some logical order (as later book-size works by Gaspar da Cruz, Bernardino de Escalante or Juan González de Mendoza would be). Instead, both aspects are present to some extent.

Pereira's manuscript starts in the style of a geographical overview. Like most later geographical works on China, he starts with listing China's provinces ("shires", in Willis' translation), stating that there are 13 of them, giving names of 11 of them and a brief information about some, and concluding that for "Confu", Yunnan and Sichuan, "how many towns [those] three shires have, we are ignorant as yet, as also of the proper names of the twelfth and thirteenth shires, and the towns therein". This shows that Pereira (or his early Jesuit editors) were not in possession of the information that the Lisbon historian João de Barros had when writing the Third of his Décadas da Ásia (published 1563, but written much earlier), which correctly lists all fifteen provinces.

He then proceeds with a brief description of Chinese cities whose "streets are wonderful to behold" and which are decorated with numerous "arches of triumph", and of the densely populated and intensively farmed countryside. He is impressed with well-paved roads and the bridges of Fujian's coastal road, built using huge stones.

Pereira is surprised that the word "China", which the Portuguese had learned in Southern and Southeastern Asia, is not known in China itself, and is curious how Chinese people call their country and themselves. He gets the answer that "the whole country is called Tamen" (i.e., Da Ming), and its people, Tamenjins (i.e., Da Ming ren, 大明人, "people of the Great Ming").

Interspersed with geographical details and references to his personal experience is a fair amount of information about the country's administration, the titles and roles of various government officials.

=== Description of the Ming law-enforcement system ===
Due to the peculiar circumstances of Pereira's stay in China, it is not surprising that a significant portion of Galeote Pereira's account deals with the "inner side" of the Ming courts and prisons.

He described harsh conditions inside the prisons of the time, as well as the practice of corporal punishment:

Their whips be bamboos, cleft in the middle, in such sort that they seem rather plain than sharp. He that is to be whipped lieth groveling on the ground. Upon his thighs the hangman layeth on blows mightily with these bamboos, that the standers-by tremble at their cruelty. Ten stripes draws a great deal of blood, twenty or thirty spoil the flesh altogether, fifty or threescore will require a long time to be healed, and if they come to the number of one hundred, then they are incurable—and they are given to whosoever hath nothing wherewith to bribe these executioners who administer them.

Despite the severity of its punishments, Pereira extols the impartiality of the Ming judicial system. The malign accusations of two local worthies, apparently their erstwhile partners, were not enough to see the Portuguese smugglers scapegoated :

For wheresoever in any town of Christendom should be accused unknown men as we were, I know not what end the very Innocents' cause would have; but we in a heathen country, having for our enemies two of the chiefest men in a whole town, wanting an interpreter, ignorant of that country's language, did in the end see our great adversaries cast into prison for our sake, and deprived of their offices and honour for not doing justice—yea, not to escape death, for as rumour goeth, they shall be beheaded. Now see if [the Ming] do justice or no.

=== Religion ===
Even in proportion to its (shorter) length, Pereira's work dwells less on religious issues than do the later books of professional Christian missionaries (such as Gaspar da Cruz, Martín de Rada or Matteo Ricci); nonetheless, he still gives a brief account of the religious practices of both Han and Hui people. He notes that people refer to the supreme divine power as "Heaven", explaining that "as we are wont to say 'God knoweth it', so say they at every word Tien xautee, that is to say 'The heavens do know it'". He did realize at least that there are several types of temples, and the divinity worshiped in some of them is referred to as Omithofom (Āmítuó Fó)

Pereira deems the Fujian Muslims to be almost entirely assimilated into the Chinese mainstream. According to him, they "knew so little of their sect, that they could say nothing else but that 'Mahomet was a Moor, my father was a Moor, and I am a Moor', with some other words of their Alcoran, wherewithal and in abstinence from swine's flesh, they live until the devil take them all" ("Moors" (Portuguese: Mouros) was at the time a common way for the Portuguese to refer to any Muslims). He says that there were over 200 Muslims in a Guangxi city he visited (not quite clear whether he is talking of Wuzhou or Guilin), all attending the Friday prayers in their mosques. He thinks, however, "that will no longer endure", because while the older generation is still observant and remembers of its old homeland in Çamarquão (Samarkand), "their posterity is so confused, that they have nothing of a Moor in them but abstinence from swine's flesh, and yet many of them do eat thereof privately".

=== Language ===
Several references to (Chinese) interpreters, or problems arising in their absence, indicate that few if any Portuguese prisoners spoke much Chinese, at least in the beginning. There is no explicit information on how much Chinese Pereira learned even by the end of his enforced stay in the country.

=== Other notable elements of Pereira's account ===
Like Gaspar da Cruz a few years later, Pereira is dismayed at the prevalence and common acceptance of homosexual liaisons:

The greatest fault we do find in them is sodomy, a vice very common in the meanest sort, and nothing strange among the best.

Marco Polo, too, had found the practice quite as prevalent and accepted under the Mongol-ruled Yuan.

But too like Polo, Pereira has some lacunae: he makes not one reference to the widespread, customary practice of foot binding (six hundred years old in his time, three in Polo's). Nor does he mention the use of the herb Camellia sinensis (tea), nor the unique character of the Empire's writing system nor to its marvelous facilities for the printing thereof.

=== Influence of Pereira's account ===
According to Boxer's estimate, about one-third of Galeote Pereira's account was later incorporated in Gaspar da Cruz's A Treatise of China, the first China-specific book published in Europe (1569). Via that book, or Bernardino de Escalante's work largely derivative of da Cruz, much of the information conveyed by Pereira got into Juan González de Mendoza's History of the Great and Mighty Kingdom of China and the Situation Thereof (1585), which was to become Europe's most authoritative book on China for the following three decades.

Fernão Mendes Pinto's Peregrinação ("Pilgrimage", 1614) depends heavily on Pereira at several points.

== Legacy ==
The 2005 English-language Thai film The King Maker shows a character similar to Galeote Pereira. Although the character is named Fernando De Gama he is known as a Portuguese soldier of fortune helping to defend the Siamese Ayutthaya Kingdom where the film is based.
