= Wang Zhi (pirate) =

Chinese pirate (died 1560)

- 王直
- Born: She County, Ming China
- Died: 22 January 1560; Hangzhou, Ming China
- Cause of death: Beheaded
- Piratical career
- Nickname: Captain Wufeng (五峰船主)
- Years active: 1540–1560
- Base of operations: South and East China Seas
- Battles: Jiajing wokou raids

Wang Zhi

Chinese name
- Chinese: 王直
Transcriptions
Standard Mandarin
- Hanyu Pinyin: Wáng Zhí
- Wade–Giles: Wang Chih
- IPA: [wǎŋ ʈʂɨ̌]
Yue: Cantonese
- Yale Romanization: Wòhng Jihk
- IPA: [wɔŋ˩ tsɪk̚˨]

Japanese name
- Kanji: 王直
Transcriptions
- Romanization: Ōchoku

Wang Zhi (Chinese: 王直 or 汪直; died 22 January 1560), art name Wufeng (五峰), was a Chinese pirate lord of the 16th century, one of the main figures among the wokou pirates prevalent during the reign of the Jiajing Emperor. Originally a salt merchant, Wang Zhi turned to smuggling during the Ming dynasty's period of maritime prohibitions banning all private overseas trade, and eventually became the head of a pirate syndicate stretching across the East and South China Seas, from Japan to Thailand. Through his clandestine trade, he is credited for spreading European firearms throughout East Asia, and for his role in leading the first Europeans (the Portuguese) to reach Japan in 1543.

On the other hand, the Ming government blamed Wang Zhi for the ravages of the Jiajing wokou raids, for which they executed Wang Zhi in 1560 when he was ashore in China trying to negotiate a relaxation of its maritime prohibitions.

== Early life ==
Wang was a native of She County of Huizhou (in present-day Huangshan City, Anhui). His mother was surnamed Wāng (汪) as opposed to his father's Wáng (王). Due to the similar surnames of his parents, some sources refer to Wang by his mother's surname, thus rendering his name as Wāng Zhi (汪直) instead of Wáng Zhi (王直). Wang became a salt merchant early in his life, following the mercantile tradition of Huizhou which had been rejuvenated by ready access to the Ming government salt monopoly. However, despite amassing considerable wealth from the salt trade, his business failed, and he was compelled to seek his fortune in the southern province of Guangdong with business associates Xu Weixue (徐惟學) and Ye Zongman (葉宗滿) in 1540. Owing to the lax regulation on maritime trade in Guangdong, Wang and his associates were able to build great seaworthy junks, which they used to carry contraband goods such as saltpeter, silks, and cotton to the markets of Southeast Asia and Japan. During his time in Southeast Asia, he became acquainted with the Portuguese, who had been in the area since they captured Malacca in 1511.

At this time, Wang's dealings with the foreigners were illegal since all private sea trade had been banned from the beginning of the Ming dynasty. Under the prohibition, all maritime trade was to be conducted through the officially sanctioned "tribute trade", in which foreign states presented tributes to the Chinese court, acknowledged themselves as vassals of the Ming, and received gifts as a sign of imperial favour. This trade, in addition to being humiliating to the foreigners involved, was inadequate to the demands of the markets, both domestic and foreign, since the Ming had strict rules about how often a vassal could come to present tribute. Wang's smuggling trade provided the supply to the demand that was unmet by the officially sanctioned trade.

== Role in the introduction of Portuguese guns to Japan ==
On 23 September 1543, Wang accompanied some Portuguese men on a ship to Tanegashima, a Japanese island to the southeast of Kyushu, in a voyage that marked one of the first times Europeans set foot in Japan. Japanese records of this event refer to Wang as Wufeng (五峯) and describe him as a Confucian scholar of the Ming who was able to communicate with the local Japanese by writing Chinese characters in the sand, since China and Japan shared the same written script at the time. The strange appearance of the Portuguese caused a local sensation, and they were eventually brought before the lord of the island, Tanegashima Tokitaka. The young lord's interest became drawn towards the matchlocks that the Portuguese were carrying, and Wang acted as an interpreter for the Portuguese to explain the workings of the guns. The guns were quickly copied and their use spread across Japan, intensifying the wars of the Sengoku period. The guns were hence known throughout Japan as tanegashima, named after the island.

The introduction of Portuguese matchlocks to Japan greatly increased the demand for saltpeter, a vital ingredient of gunpowder — a demand that Wang was on hand to meet. Since Japan did not produce its own saltpeter, he brought Chinese and Siamese saltpeter into Japan amongst other goods, while transporting Japanese sulfur (another ingredient of gunpowder) to Siam. In the process, he became immensely wealthy and gained a reputation among the Japanese and the foreign countries.

Since Japan was undergoing a protracted period of civil war, the lack of an effective central authority (neither the emperor nor the shōgun held any real power at the time) made Wang free to enter patronage agreements with the regional daimyō who wielded actual control over territories. At first, Wang set up base on Fukue Island, having negotiated with the Uku clan (宇久氏), lords of the Gotō Islands, to settle there. A Chinatown soon grew across the river from the Uku clan's castle. He also maintained a residence in Hirado at the northwestern tip of Kyushu, and enjoyed the patronage of its lord Matsura Takanobu. His presence in Hirado attracted other merchant-pirates and the Portuguese, who sent their "black ship" to Hirado almost every year until the establishment of Nagasaki.

== The Shuangyu syndicate ==
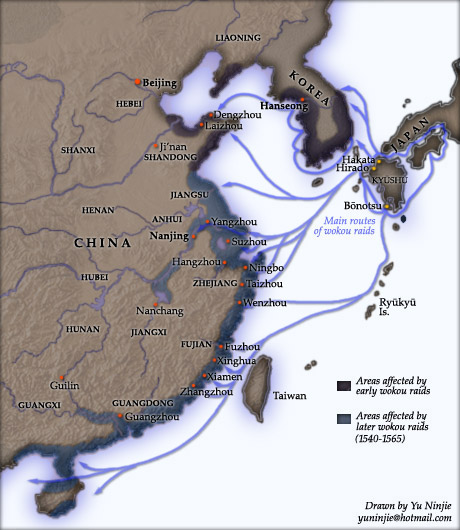
Map of the wokou raids in Wang Zhi's time (blue), with sea routes from Japan

In 1544, Wang joined the Xu brothers, the heads of a pirate syndicate based in Shuangyu, Zhejiang who were also natives of his home She County. They took notice of his experience and ability in trade, and so Wang quickly rose to become their financial supervisor (管庫). Later, they made him commander of the armed fleet (管哨) and councillor on military affairs, and he became revered as Captain Wufeng (五峰船主).

Wang's connection with Japan quickly proved useful to the Xu brothers when in the same year, a Japanese ship on an unofficial tribute mission to China passed by Tanegashima and landed in the Chinese port city Ningbo. This Japanese ship did not carry the proper documents and was refused by the Ningbo officials, and he was able to convince the emissaries to barter their goods illicitly in nearby Shuangyu instead. The next year, Wang led more Japanese traders to Shuangyu while encouraging Xu Dong (許棟), the leader of the Xu brothers, to send his own ships to Japan. Thereafter, Shuangyu became the primary smuggling port for Japanese traders in China.

As Wang's enterprise grew, he started hiring Japanese fighters to protect their cargo from rival pirate gangs and the Ming navy, and eventually to defeat other pirates and assimilate their followers into his own consortium. The local residents of Shuangyu looked up to Wang and willingly aided the pirates, since the smuggling trade brought considerable wealth to the island. The villagers, who previously relied on subsistence agriculture and fishing to make a living, turned to making weapons and armour for Wang and other pirates of the area: "[They] melted copper coins to make shot, used saltpeter to make gunpowder, iron to make swords and guns, and leather to make their armour." Their admiration for the pirates was such that not only did they provide the pirates with daily necessities, they also gave women and pledged their own children. Many youngsters willingly joined Wang's group.

The Ming court disapproved of the illegal trade and piratical activities centred at Shuangyu. On a stormy night in June 1548, a fleet under the veteran general Zhu Wan razed Shuangyu to the ground and filled its harbour with stones, rendering it permanently unusable. Despite heavy casualties, Wang managed to escape Shuangyu with the help of the summer monsoon winds. Xu Dong fled overseas, which left Wang to assume control of the syndicate that Xu Dong left behind. Since Wang had already controlled the Xu brothers' fleet and treasury, opposition to his rise to leadership was minimal.

== King of Hui: The wokou pirate lord ==
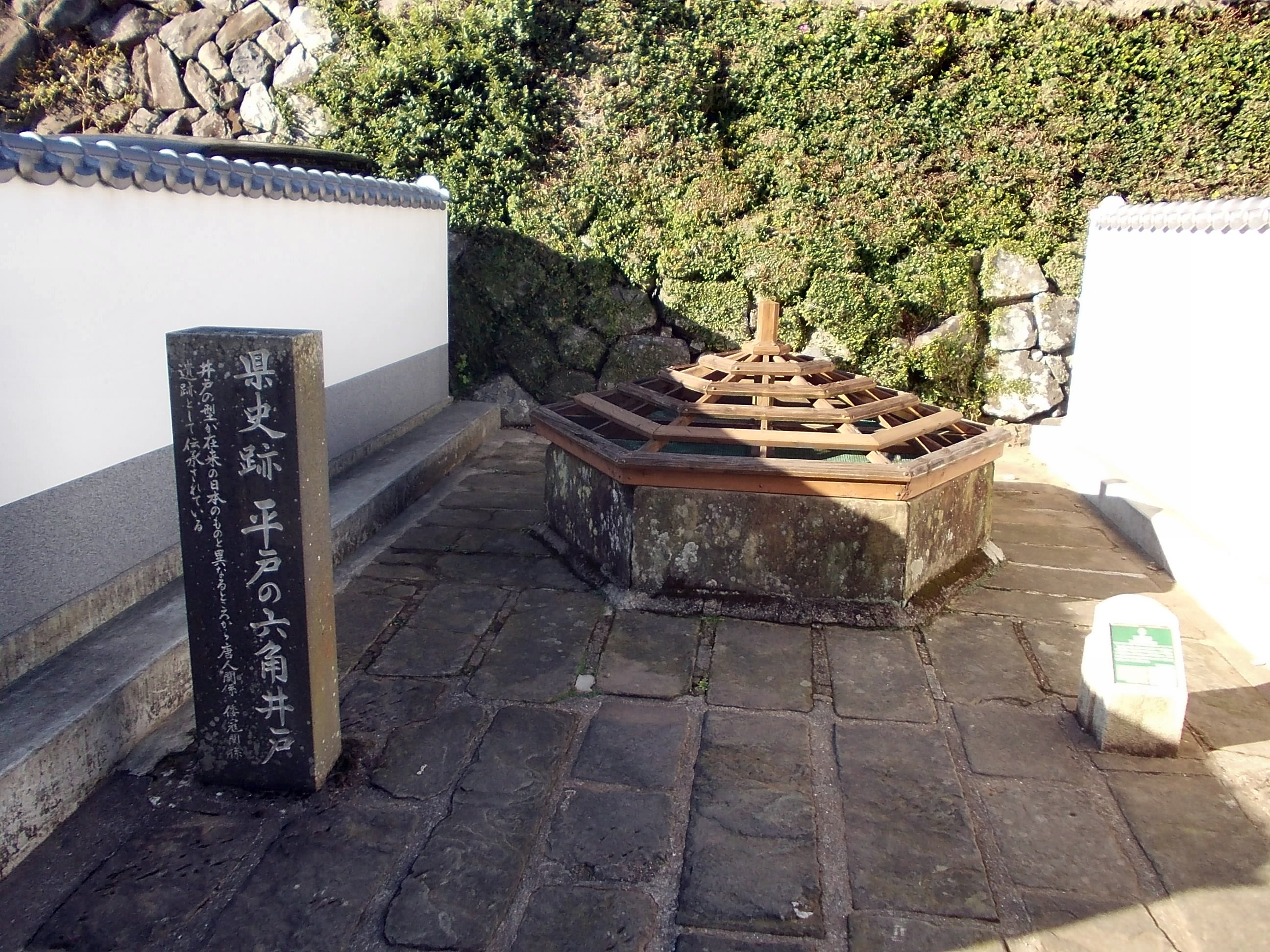
Ming-style hexagonal well in Hirado from Wang Zhi's time there

The destruction of Shuangyu disrupted the relatively orderly system of illegal trade previously centered around the port, and the smugglers scattered across the Chinese coast, with some becoming pirate raiders in the process. For his part, Wang re-established himself at Ligang (瀝港, also named Liegang 列港, on Jintang Island) and continued expanding his consortium. He adopted Mao Haifeng (毛海峰), a Zhejiang trader skilled in the use of Portuguese cannons, as his son and utilized the latter's knowledge to fit his ships with cannons. In 1551, he led a coalition of merchant-pirates to destroy his rival Chen Sipan (陳思泮) with the connivance of the Ningbo military officials. With Chen Sipan defeated, Wang's supremacy in the China seas was assured. Many pirates fell in behind Wang, and it was said that no ship dared to sail without his banner.

In a bid to have the Ming government lift the maritime prohibition and legitimize his illicit trade, Wang portrayed his expansion as keeping the peace on the coast. He collaborated with the Ming officials by turning Chen Sipan over to the authorities. Despite these efforts, the Ming authorities tightened the restrictions later in 1551 by banning even fishing boats from going out to sea, and Wang was only rewarded 100 shoulder-loads of rice for his trouble. Wang, indignant, dumped the rice into the sea and sent his pirate fleets to loot the Chinese coast. The Ming responded by sending the military general Yu Dayou with several thousand war junks to dislodge Wang from Ligang in 1553. Wang fled to Japan.

Wang soon re-established himself on the Gotō Islands and Hirado, where he had previously set footholds with the connivance of the local daimyō. There Wang called himself the King of Hui (徽王), dressed himself in royal colours, and surrounded himself with standard-bearers. It was said that in Hirado, Wang had up to 2,000 workers and owned hundreds of ships. Wang's influence in Japan grew beyond his bases on the Gotō Islands and Hirado as he established contact with hegemons like the Ōtomo clan of Bungo and the Ōuchi clan of Yamaguchi, and his associates were embedded in the court of the Shimazu clan of Kagoshima.

Gathering desperados from all over Japan and mixing them into his predominantly Chinese bands, Wang sent out pirate fleets to raid the coast of mainland China from his island bases. The pirates were called wokou ("Japanese pirates") and the raids become known as the Jiajing wokou raids. The wokou attacks started as swift raids on coastal settlements to obtain provisions and goods for trade, then returned to their ships and left. Eventually, the situation escalated to the point where a pirate raid could number hundreds of ships, defeat garrisons, and besiege county seats. Coastal cities from Korea to Guangdong were affected, and even the relatively inland secondary Ming capital Nanjing was threatened. Wang might have hoped that by such a show of force the Ming government could be intimidated to legalize private overseas trade, while he always maintained that he never led a raid in person. Be that as it may, the Ming government considered Wang as the ringleader ultimately responsible for the devastation on the coast, and the Jiajing Emperor ordered for Wang's capture, dead or alive.

== Negotiations with the Ming government and death ==
In July 1555, Hu Zongxian, a native of Huizhou like Wang, was assigned to deal with the wokou problem. Unlike his hardline predecessors like Zhu Wan, Hu was open to liberalizing trade in order to put an end to the piracy. Hu sent envoys to Japan for the dual purpose of requesting assistance from Japanese authorities, and to establish contact with Wang to entice him to surrender. As a sign of goodwill, he also released Wang's family from prison and had them moved to his headquarters at Hangzhou under his care and supervision. Wang and Mao Haifeng met the envoys on the Gotō Islands where they explained that there was no single authority in Japan that could command the Japanese pirates to cease their activities. On the other hand, they were enticed by the opportunity for their trade to be legalized, and offered to fight other pirates for the Ming in return for a pardon of their crimes and the permission to present tribute. Hu relayed the message to the imperial court in Beijing, who responded with skepticism and indignation: tributes could only be presented by foreigners so Wang's request had seditious implications to the Ming government. In any case, the court did not object to Wang's offer to fight the pirates on their behalf, and soon Mao Haifeng started clearing pirate nests on Zhoushan Island.

During the meeting on the Gotō Islands, Wang also warned that Xu Hai, a pirate leader in his consortium, was on his way to raid China and Wang was not able to stop him in time. Peace efforts had to be put on hold as Hu Zongxian dealt with Xu's raid in 1556. During the raid, Xu was shocked to hear that Wang was negotiating his own surrender with Hu Zongxian, and Hu was able to use this to manipulate Xu into betraying his allies. Eventually, the raid was put down with Xu Hai and other leaders killed, and negotiations between Wang and Hu could resume.

On 17 October 1557, Wang arrived at Cengang (岑港) in Zhoushan Island with a large trading fleet sent by Ōtomo Sōrin, who was buoyed by the prospect of China opening trade with Japan. The local officials feared this was another wokou invasion and readied the troops. Additionally upon their arrival, Wang learned of a plot by Hu Zongxian's lieutenant Lu Tang to bribe the Ōtomo men to present Wang in ropes, which made the merchant-pirates suspicious of Hu's intentions. Hu Zongxian was only able to allay their fears by sending a high official to the pirates as hostage. Then Wang laid down his terms for surrender: he sought an imperial pardon, a naval commission, and that ports be open for trade; in return he offered to patrol the coast and persuade the raiders to return to the islands through force if necessary. Hu was prepared to send a memorial to the throne about Wang's petition, but the political climate had quickly changed against opening trade. Hu's political patron Zhao Wenhua, the major pusher of an appeasement policy, had been brought down by charges of embezzlement. Hu himself was the target of a rumour that he received bribes from Wang and the Ōtomo to pardon their crimes and accede to their requests. The political situation did not allow Hu Zongxian to ask the emperor that Wang be pardoned. Instead of dirtying his own hands, Hu told Wang to present his petition to the investigating censor Wang Bengu (王本固), a political hardliner, in Hangzhou.

In December, confident in his prospects and his invulnerability, Wang made landing at Hangzhou. There he was accorded respectable treatment by the authorities, who feared antagonizing his followers, while they figure out what to do with him. During this time Hu Zongxian asked Wang to help manufacture matchlocks for the Ming army, which led to the weapon being widely used in China. Finally in February next year, Wang Bengu had Wang Zhi put in prison, where he was still given the luxuries of novelties, books, and healthy foods. Wang Zhi believed this was a temporary arrangement and remained hopeful for a pardon until 22 January 1560, when an imperial edict handed down the death sentence. He was brought to the execution grounds in a palanquin, and only upon arrival did he realize he was to be executed. He called for his son, gave him a hairpin as a memento, then held him in embrace, crying: "Never have I imagined that I would be executed here!" He was then beheaded before an audience. His wife and children were reduced to the status of slaves. Mao Haifeng had Hu Zongxian's hostage dismembered and gave up hopes for peace; the wokou raids continued until 1567.

== Legacy ==
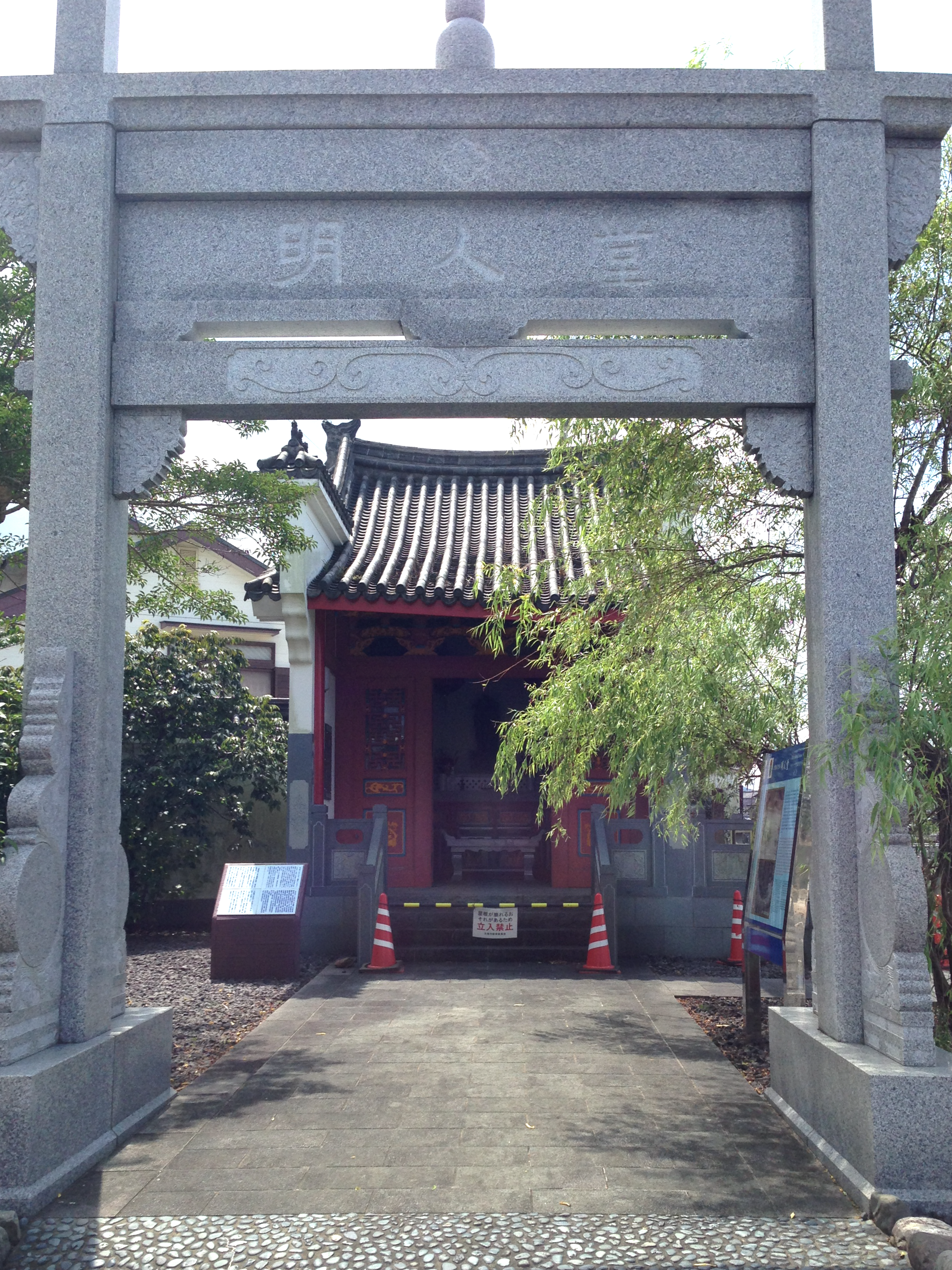
Minjindō (明人堂; "Hall of the Ming People"), reconstruction of the Chinese temple that Wang Zhi frequented on Fukue Island

Wang left behind a difficult legacy, as he was at the same time a merchant who fostered maritime trade and a "pirate king" who was at the top of a violent enterprise. Years after Wang's death, his name remained toxic and was utilized as a tool to smear political opponents. In 1562, Hu Zongxian was forced to retire after he was accused for being too lenient and friendly with Wang on the basis that they were from the same region, among other perceived transgressions. In another purge in 1565, Xu Jie alleged his rival Yan Song's son Yan Shifan (嚴世蕃) was involved in a plot to overthrow the dynasty with the remnants of Wang's pirate gang. Yan Shifan was executed and Hu Zongxian, being implicated in the matter, died in prison. Even the Japanese invasions of Korea from 1592 to 1598 were connected to Wang in the History of Ming as it claimed Toyotomi Hideyoshi gained confidence to invade Korea and China from remnants of Wang's gang, who said the Chinese feared the Japanese "as if they were tigers". Wang's reputation as a pirate and a rebel continued to the present day in China, with some calling him a race traitor (hanjian) for collaborating with Japanese pirates.

In Japan today, Wang is commemorated as a Sino-Japanese figure of trade instead of piracy, and locales associated with him are emphasized in Fukue and Hirado. Chinese-style hexagonal wells from Wang's time were preserved in Fukue and Hirado, and a Chinese temple in Fukue that Wang was said to have frequented was rebuilt. In Hirado, Wang is celebrated for bringing the Portuguese to the city, ushering in the Nanban trade in Japan and a period of prosperity in Hirado. A statue of Wang, along with statues of early Europeans who came to Hirado, was placed on the road leading to the local history museum, and a stone stele stands on the site where Wang's mansion used to be.

The opposing views on Wang came to a head in dramatic fashion in 2005, when Guo Quan from the Nanjing Normal University and another university instructor from Lishui University smashed a monument stele to the tomb of Wang in Huangshan City. The tomb stele had been erected in 2000 using donations by a Japanese group based in Fukue, with the apparent intention of promoting friendship between Fukue and Huangshan. The vandals claimed they were justified in defacing the tomb since the Japanese had disrespected China by building a monument to a race traitor. The monument was eventually demolished by provincial authorities for violating regulations governing tombs. The affair was widely reported as national news in China, bringing the debates surrounding Wang into public attention and sparking a new wave of research on the Jiajing wokou raids.
