= Radda =

Radda may refer to:

- Radha Cuadrado, a Filipino singer and songwriter
- George Radda, a Hungarian chemist
- Radda District, a district of the Al Bayda Governorate, Yemen
- Radda in Chianti, municipality in the Province of Siena in the Italian region Tuscany

== See also ==
- Rada (disambiguation)
