= Jiajing wokou raids =

16th-century conflicts

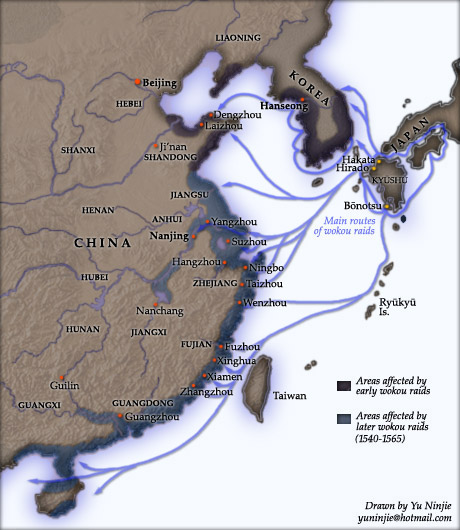
- Map of early wokou raids (violet) and later Jiajing wokou raids (blue), with sea routes from Japan
Date	1540s to 1567
Location	Jiangnan, Zhejiang, Fujian, and Guangdong
Result	Ming victory

Belligerents
Wokou	Ming dynasty

Commanders and leaders
Wang Zhi; Xu Hai	Zhu Wan; Zhang Jing; Zhao Wenhua; Hu Zongxian; Qi Jiguang; Yu Dayou

Jiajing wokou raids
- Chinese: 嘉靖大倭寇
- Literal meaning: Jiajing Great Wo Raids
Transcriptions
Standard Mandarin
- Hanyu Pinyin: Jiājìng Dà Wō Kòu

Alternative Chinese name
- Traditional Chinese: 嘉靖倭亂
- Simplified Chinese: 嘉靖倭乱
- Literal meaning: Jiajing Wo Crisis
Transcriptions
Standard Mandarin
- Hanyu Pinyin: Jiājìng Wō Luàn

The Jiajing wokou raids caused extensive damage to the coast of China in the 16th century, during the reign of the Jiajing Emperor (r. 1521–67) in the Ming dynasty. The term "wokou" originally referred to Japanese pirates who crossed the sea and raided Korea and China; however, by the mid-Ming, the wokou consisted of multinational crewmen that included the Japanese and the Portuguese, but a great majority of them were Chinese instead. Mid-Ming wokou activity began to pose a serious problem in the 1540s, reached its peak in 1555, and subsided by 1567, with the extent of the destruction spreading across the coastal regions of Jiangnan, Zhejiang, Fujian, and Guangdong.

== Historical background ==
=== Maritime trade in 16th century China ===
Up until the establishment of the Ming dynasty in 1368, China had had a great maritime trading tradition that extended the Chinese trading network by sea all the way into the Indian Ocean. In 1371, the Ming founder Hongwu Emperor implemented the "maritime prohibitions" (haijin), banning all private sea trade in order to clear the seas of all piratical elements. Under the prohibition, all maritime trade were to be conducted through the officially sanctioned "tribute trade", which was a kind of trade where foreign tributary states presented tributes to the Chinese court, acknowledged themselves as vassals of the Ming, and received gifts as a sign of imperial favour. This trade, in addition to being humiliating to the foreigners involved (Sinocentrism), was inadequate to the demands of the markets, both domestic and foreign, since the Ming had strict rules about how often a vassal could come to present tribute. Still, the tribute trade, being the only legal form of trade with China, was extremely profitable. Hence many states, including Japan, were willing to subject themselves to the rituals of the Chinese tributary system.

The Japanese were assigned the Zhejiang city of Ningbo as their port of entry into China, and were allowed to present tribute once every 10 years. These Japanese missions to Ming China continued up to Japan's Sengoku period, when the hold of the Ashikaga shogunate waned and power became divided by the warring regional daimyōs. These internecine feuds reached China in the Ningbo incident of 1523, when traders from the Ōuchi clan fought with those of the Hosokawa clan in Ningbo for the right to present tribute, which spiralled out of hand and resulted in the widespread pillage of Ningbo. When a Ming fleet appeared onto the scene to restore peace, the fleet was defeated instead and the Japanese traders got away. After this episode, the Ming banned all Japanese from trading in Ningbo, who would have to join the pirates on offshore islands in order to trade Chinese goods.

In May 1513, Portuguese explorers reached the coast of Guangdong, bringing the Columbian Exchange into China. This created a new global demand for Chinese products, while European firearms and New World crops were introduced to China for the first time. However, the potential of the China market was limited by the Ming's insistence of the maritime prohibitions. Early Portuguese attempts at trade negotiations were unsuccessful, and the Portuguese presence at the mouth of the Pearl River was driven off in the Battle of Tunmen of 1521 and the Battle of Xicaowan of 1522. The Portuguese, like the Japanese, were hence forced to conduct their trade illegally on the islands along the coast of China, away from the reach of the Ming authorities.

Thus, both the Japanese and the Portuguese were left out of the tributary trade by the first decades of the 16th century. By the middle of the century though, Japan and Portugal became the premier suppliers of silver in East Asia by bringing in silver from mines such as the Iwami Ginzan in Japan and the Cerro de Potosí in Bolivia. Silver was the lifeblood of the Ming Chinese economy, but the Ming government placed many restrictions on mining due to fears that the bullion would pool into private hands. Even without the restrictions, China's silver veins were too small and located too far away in the southwest from the commercialized and populous coastal provinces to keep up with the huge demand. This situation made unofficial dealings with foreigners very profitable and enticing for Chinese merchants, despite the risks and illegality of their trade.

=== The "wokou" ===
The term "wokou" literally means "dwarf pirates", with "wo" (倭; "dwarf") being the Classical Chinese pejorative for the Japanese people. The term was first used to refer to Japanese invaders on the Gwanggaeto Stele in 414 AD, and was reused in 1223 when Japanese pirates raided the Korean coast. These pirates eventually broadened their area of operations to the coast of China, and were active throughout East Asian coasts up to the establishment of the Ming dynasty in China. However, by the 16th century, the pirates nominally called the "wokou" were mostly not Japanese, but actually Chinese. According to the History of Ming and other contemporary Chinese records, only thirty percent of the 16th century wokou were Japanese, while seventy percent were ethnic Chinese. Moreover, the Chinese played the leading role in these later wokou raids, with the Japanese and those of other nationalities being associates and hired hands.

The Chinese people at the forefront of the wokou activities were merchants whose trade overseas was deemed illegal by the Ming government. Since the Ming government prohibited people from heading out to sea and forbid those who had from returning home, a large number of Chinese maritime merchants were forced to establish themselves on offshore islands or even overseas trading ports. Among the traders stationed overseas, of note were Xu Dong (許棟) and his brothers who began their fortunes in Malacca and Patani; and Wang Zhi and Xu Hai who based themselves in the southern Japanese island of Kyushu. The Chinese traders in Kyushu had deep ties with the local daimyo, who provided patronage and refuge for the merchant-pirates in return for a share of their profits. For example, Xu Hai's right-hand man was described to be the younger brother of the Satsuma lord Shimazu Takahisa, while his associate Chen Dong (陳東) held a high position in the Satsuma court as the chief of Shimazu's secretariat.

To protect their cargo from rival pirate gangs and the Ming navy, the merchant-pirates armed themselves with Portuguese guns and cannons and hired Japanese fighters. Despite the Ming being introduced to Portuguese firearms in the 1520s, these firearms were mostly deployed on the northern frontier and not on the coast. Furthermore, Wang Zhi helped the Portuguese traders reach Tanegashima in 1543, where the Portuguese introduced the arquebus to the Japanese for the first time. This armed the Japanese, who already had a reputation for being fearsome swordsmen, with firearms more advanced than what the Chinese coastal defense forces had at the time. The Ming aboriginal troops were said to be especially afraid of the pirates' arquebuses.

=== Coastal defence and politics ===
The blunder of the Ming navy during the 1523 Ningbo incident highlighted the decline of Chinese naval capabilities since the cessation of the famed treasure voyages in 1433. The early Ming had a system of coastal patrols and island bases for the defence of the Chinese coast, but these were withdrawn as the Ming foreign policy turned from proactive to passive during the reign of the Zhengtong Emperor (r. 1435–49). The official reason for the withdrawal was that these forward bases in the sea were a heavy burden on the civilians who had to supply them, and that the Ming army could focus on defence after the invaders had landed. Since then, warships were no longer used to patrol the coast and remained anchored in ports, where they rotted away from neglect. As an extreme example, the Dengzhou naval garrison in Shandong had a fleet of 100 warships in its heyday, but by the beginning of the 16th century, only 3 ships remained after years of retrenchment and disrepair. By the start of the wokou crisis in the 1540s, there were only 68 government warships on the coast of Fujian, while funds allotted for ship construction were apparently embezzled. Furthermore, naval garrisons along the coast were unwilling to build and accommodate for new ships since each ship needed people and resources for its maintenance. Ships confiscated from the pirates and redistributed to the naval garrisons ended up being stolen, exchanged, or scuttled.

In addition to the deterioration of the warships, decades of peace along the coast had relegated the military to a low importance, and garrisons became severely understaffed due to desertion. By the early 1550s these garrisons were reduced to roughly one third of their full complements of soldiers. During the wokou crisis, defenders had to augment their forces with various militia and mercenary groups like gentry guards, local ruffians, and even Shaolin monks. The Ming government, being committed to the northern frontier defence against the Mongols, could only spare reinforcements to the coast in the form of bandit fighters, ex-pirates, and aboriginal "wolf troops" (狼兵, langbing) led by government-recognized tribal headmen. These assorted troops, euphemistically called "guest troops" (客兵, kebing), were generally ineffective in battle and were often a burden to the local populace.

The general dilapidation of the military was a symptom of the confused administration of the coastal provinces. The Ming provincial administration was split into three parallel hierarchies: one for civil, one for military, and one for surveillance. This deliberately fragmented structure was meant to provide checks against regionalism and the rise of powerful officials at the provincial level; however, it also made for an ineffective response during emergencies. Beginning in the middle of the 15th century, grand coordinators (xunfu) and supreme commanders (zongdu) were sent to the provinces undergoing military emergencies to override the existing provincial hierarchies. In the wokou-stricken provinces, however, a grand coordinator had not been appointed until 1547 due to the interference of the coastal gentry who were involved with the illegal foreign trade.

Doing away with foreign pirates is easy, but doing away with Chinese pirates is difficult. Doing away with Chinese pirates along the coast is still easy, but doing away with Chinese pirates in gowns and caps is particularly difficult.

— Zhu Wan, from History of Ming vol. 205, "Biography of Zhu Wan"

The coastal gentry, well-represented in the Ming court due to the abundance of successful imperial examination candidates from among their numbers, compounded their wealth by sponsoring the smugglers with seagoing vessels and profiteered by reselling the smuggled goods at a higher value, sometimes delaying or even refusing to pay the smugglers. They were able to keep the smugglers' dissatisfaction in check by cajolery, marriage alliances, and threatening to summon the Ming military on the smugglers. On the other hand, they protected themselves by hiring mercenaries as guards and bribing the local officials to look the other way. Zhu Wan, who became the Grand Coordinator of Zhejiang in 1547, called these gentry members "pirates in gowns and caps" (衣冠之盜), and identified them as the root cause of the coastal disturbances. In the 1540s, this gentry-led equilibrium began to fall apart as the dissatisfied smugglers went rogue from their gentry sponsors. The Veritable Records of the Ming points to a raid in 1547 as the start of the wokou troubles, where smugglers and foreigners burned down the Xie family estate in Yuyao after the prominent Xie clan (謝氏) refused to pay their debts to the smugglers and threatened to inform the government.

== Shuangyu, the illegal entrepôt ==
Wokou activity in the Yangtze River Delta and Zhejiang

After their ouster from the coastal ports of China, Japanese and Portuguese traders collaborated with illegal smugglers on island ports along the Zhejiang and Fujian coast. Among these ports, Shuangyu on Liuheng Island (六橫島) off the coast of Ningbo emerged as the primary emporium of clandestine trade.

At first, Shuangyu only had temporary mat-sheds for the smugglers to house themselves and their goods during the trading season. In 1539, Fujianese traders started to guide foreign traders from Patani and Malacca to barter in Shuangyu and started to occupy the island. They were soon joined by the Fujianese merchants Jinzi Lao (金子老, "Gold Elder") and Li Guangtou (李光頭, "Baldy Li"), who led the Portuguese and assorted adventurers to Shuangyu. Attracted by the growing trade on the Zhejiang coast, the Xu brothers' syndicate moved their base of operations from the Malay Peninsula to Shuangyu. The existing clout of the Xu syndicate and its close partnership with the Portuguese made it the foremost smuggling bloc by 1542 after a series of mergers among the merchant-pirates in Shuangyu.

The Ming navy began to clamp down on smuggling activities in 1543, but the Xu syndicate was able to repulse the Ming attacks in Shuangyu with the aid of Portuguese firepower. Hardened by their victories against the Ming navy, the smugglers expanded their network of activities down the coast of China all the way to Guangdong and inland to the metropolis of Nanjing, with Shuangyu being their hub. In 1544, this network was further expanded when Wang Zhi joined the Xu syndicate, bringing along his Japanese connections to Shuangyu. Thus Shuangyu reached its zenith as the biggest entrepôt in maritime East Asia trading goods from Europe and Asia until its downfall in 1548.

== The campaigns of Zhu Wan ==
=== The fall of Shuangyu ===
After several years of debate over the disturbances on the coast, the Ming court under Senior Grand Secretary Xia Yan decided to appoint a new grand coordinator to manage coastal defense in the two provinces most affected by the turbulence, Zhejiang and Fujian. In 1547, the veteran general Zhu Wan was made the Grand Coordinator of Zhejiang and Concurrent Superintendent of Military Affairs for Zhejiang and Fujian Coastal Defense (巡撫浙江兼提督浙閩海防軍務), a new position specifically created to deal with the resurgent wokou problem. It was the first time in many decades that Zhejiang had a single administrative head instead of having three provincial heads each in charge of the military, provincial, and surveillance hierarchies.

The situation on the coast had become very dire at the start of Zhu Wan's tenure as grand coordinator. In December 1547, the Portuguese had plundered Zhangzhou, and in February the next year the cities of Ningbo and Taizhou were struck by an unprecedented 1,000 raiders aboard a hundred ships. This raid happened whilst Zhu Wan was inspecting in Fujian, and the government troops could not stop the raiders from killing, looting, and burning government offices and homes. Despite the dismal state of coastal defence and the widespread collusion between the gentry and the pirates, Zhu Wan carried out his task energetically. He strictly enforced the maritime prohibitions, forbidding anyone from venturing out to sea on penalty of death, and put all ships to use for defence of the coast. He also publicized the names of the influential persons involved in the illegal trade, to the annoyance of the local gentry.

On 15 April 1548, Zhu Wan's fleet in Wenzhou set sail for Shuangyu under the command of Lu Tang and Ke Qiao (柯喬). The fleet descended onto Shuangyu one night in June, under the cover of thick weather. Fifty-five to a few hundred smugglers perished in the attack, but the leading figures such as Li Guangtou and Wang Zhi were able to escape. Lu Tang then razed the town and rendered the harbour permanently unusable by filling it in with stones under Zhu Wan's orders. Zhu Wan and his generals were greatly rewarded in silver for the victory, but he also drew the ire of his political enemies among the gentry, whose profits were directly affected by the destruction of Shuangyu. Eventually a pretense was found to demote Zhu Wan to the temporary position of inspector general (巡視), the argument being one man cannot control two provinces at the same time.

=== The Zoumaxi incident ===
Wokou activity in Fujian

After the loss of Shuangyu, the smugglers scattered along the coast of Zhejiang and Fujian to find good hideouts to trade. The deep water inlet of Zoumaxi (走馬溪, "Running Horse Creek") by the Dongshan Peninsula near the Fujian-Guangdong border was found to be a suitable place for trade since the terrain sheltered the ships from the winds, and the inhabitants of nearby Meiling (梅嶺) had been greatly involved in the illicit trade. On 19 March 1549, Lu Tang and Ke Qiao ambushed two junks in Zoumaxi while they were trading with the Portuguese aboard resulting in 33 deaths and 206 smugglers captured. Among the captured were Li Guangtou and a number of Portuguese men, and Lu Tang had four of the more good-looking Portuguese pretend to be kings of Malacca in order to make the victory seem more complete. Fearing that the captives might bribe their way out, Zhu Wan executed 96 of the Chinese smugglers using his discretionary powers.

Zhu Wan's unauthorized executions of the Zoumaxi captives provided an excellent opportunity for his political enemies. On April 27, Zhu Wan was impeached for exceeding his authority since executions had to be sanctioned by the emperor. The Jiajing Emperor dismissed Zhu Wan from his post and ordered a full investigation on the matter. Seeing that the odds were against him, especially since his backer Xia Yan had been executed in disgrace in October last year, Zhu Wan wrote his own epitaph and committed suicide by drinking poison in January 1550. The investigation confirmed the allegations that Zhu Wan had killed the prisoners without imperial authorization, and so a posthumous death sentence was handed down. Lu Tang and Ke Qiao were also condemned to death, and the Portuguese smugglers were let off lightly, with exile as their punishment. The ordeal left Galeote Pereira, one of the Portuguese crewmen captured in Zoumaxi, very impressed by what he perceived as the impartiality of the Chinese justice system.

== Acceleration of wokou activity ==
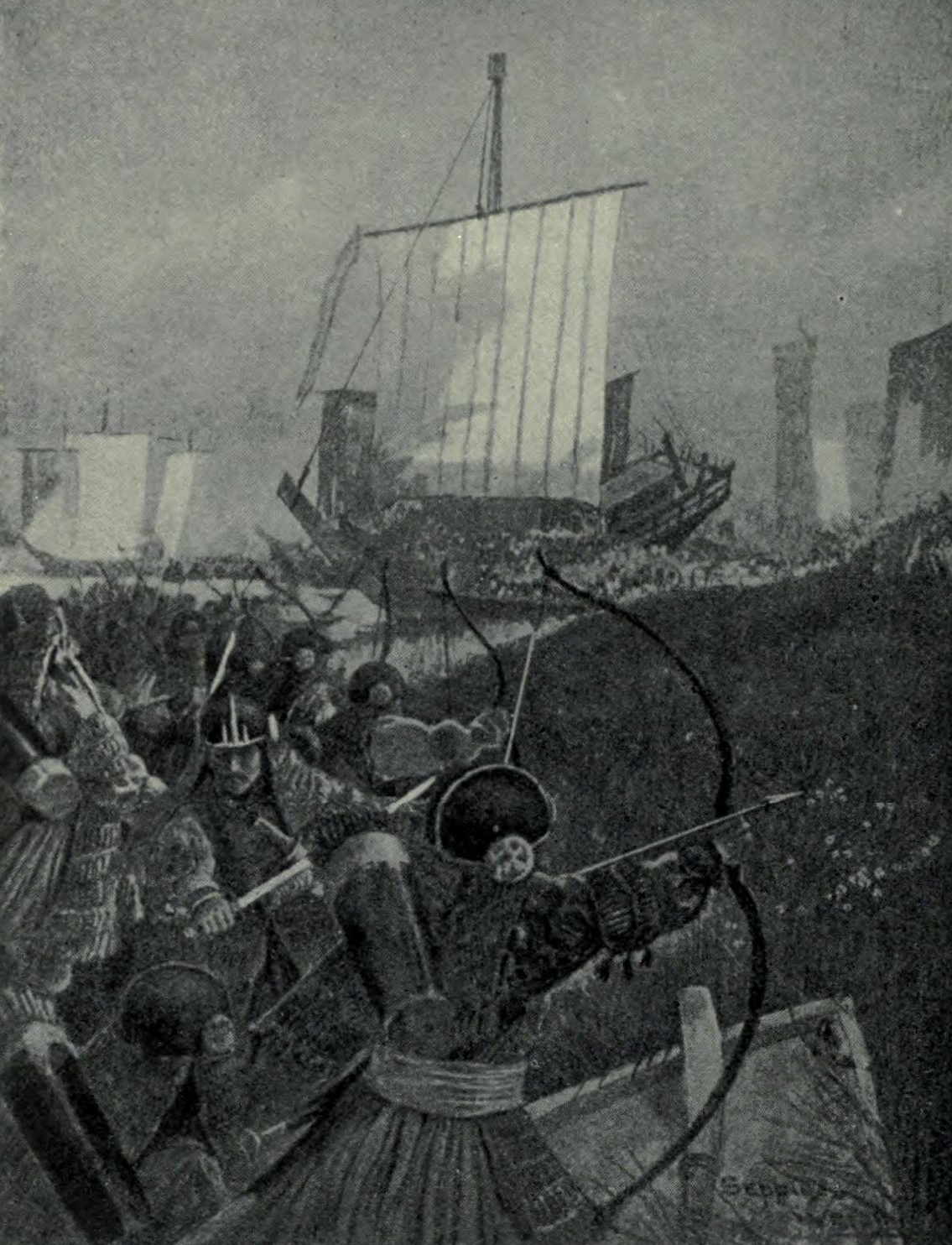
20th-century illustration of a wokou raid at the Chinese coast.

The death of Zhu Wan was followed by the wholesale reversion of his policies, and the fleet that Zhu had assembled was dispersed. For three years the position held by Zhu Wan remained vacant, and during these years apparently no government official dared to mention the coastal situation in the adverse political atmosphere. Despite the coastal gentry's political victory over Zhu Wan, they had destroyed their trump card against the merchant-pirates — the threat of the Ming army — and the wokou raiders took full advantage of the military vacuum. The gentry, now facing frequent attacks on their own estates, begrudgingly began to assist the state in putting down the wokou.

Their illicit trading networks disrupted, the overseas traders banded together against the perceived intensification of the Ming anti-pirate campaign. Wang Zhi emerged as the leader of the most prominent of these armed bands after Xu Dong exited the scene. The Xu brothers had placed Wang Zhi in charge of their fleets, finances, and foreign contacts, so Wang did not have much trouble taking over the whole syndicate. He settled on the Gotō Islands of Japan after the Ming made him an outlaw. There he called himself the King of Hui (徽王) and established good relations not only with the local daimyo Matsura Takanobu, but also with regional hegemons like Ōtomo Sōrin and Ōuchi Yoshitaka. Despite his great power, Wang Zhi initially sought to appease the Ming government in hope of getting the maritime prohibitions relaxed, so he turned the rival pirate leaders that he captured over to the authorities. Instead, the Ming authorities tightened the restrictions in 1551, banning even fishing boats from going out to sea. Indignant, Wang Zhi set his pirate fleets upon the Chinese coast.

The wokou attacks started as swift raids on coastal settlements to obtain provisions and goods for trade, then returned to their ships and left. By the summer of 1553, the situation escalated to the point where a pirate raid could number hundreds of ships, defeat garrisons, and besiege district seats. In 1554, the wokou set up bases along the coast from where they could conduct their raids, threatening the great cities of Suzhou, Hangzhou, and Nanjing.

== Attempts at wokou suppression ==
In 1552, the Grand Coordinator of Shandong Wang Yu (王忬) was summoned to take Zhu Wan's old grand coordinator position in Zhejiang. As grand coordinator, Wang Yu recruited talents like Yu Dayou and Tang Kekuan (湯克寬), as well as releasing Lu Tang and Ke Qiao from death row to make use of their experience against the wokou. He initiated a program to strengthen the towns and villages, which led to many towns being walled for the first time. However, Wang Yu's armies suffered repeated defeats in 1553 and 1554, during which the cities of Hangzhou, Songjiang, Tongzhou, and Jiaxing were attacked by the pirates. The raids on these cities along the Grand Canal were especially worrying to the court in Beijing since they threatened the tax-grain shipments from the breadbasket of southern China. Wang Yu was sacked in 1554 for his failure.

In Wang Yu's place, Li Tianchong (李天寵) took the position of Grand Coordinator of Zhejiang. Furthermore, the Nanjing Minister of War Zhang Jing was appointed Supreme Commander of the armed forces in six coastal provinces: Shandong, the Southern Metropolitan Region, Zhejiang, Fujian, Guangdong, and Guangxi. This new position, ranked higher than grand coordinators, was made specifically in response to the wokou crisis.

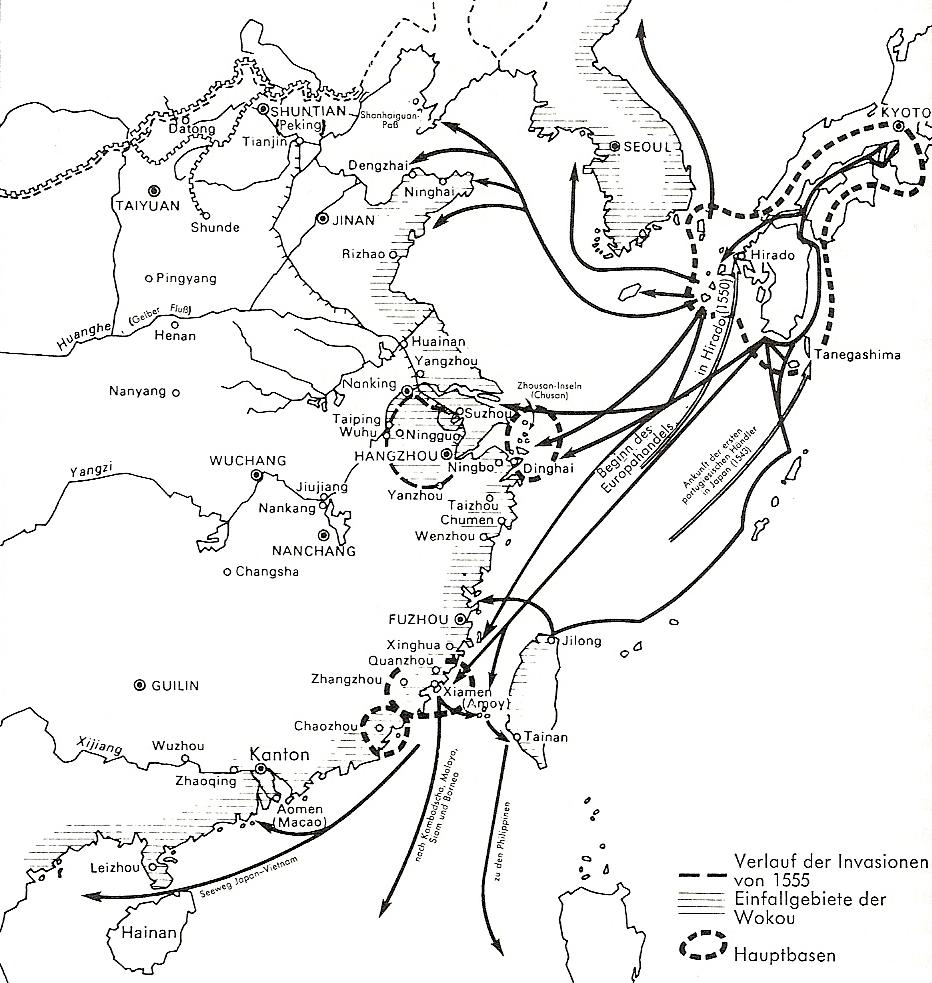
Map showing the wokou attacks of 1555.

By this time, 8 out of 11 prefectures of Zhejiang had been ravaged by the pirates, and 1555 was on its way to become the most disastrous year of the wokou crisis. The pirates, numbering up to 20,000 men, had established fortifications along the Zhejiang coast and placed their headquarters at Zhelin (柘林) on the coast south of Shanghai. Their warships controlled the Huangpu River, and the raiding parties even carried artillery with them to besiege cities. The pirates belonged to an alliance of three Satsuma-based pirate leaders, Xu Hai, Chen Dong (陳東), and Ye Ma (葉麻), with the secondary capital Nanjing being the goal of their raids. They had hoped to capture the great metropolis Hangzhou before continuing onto Nanjing, but Xu Hai's band, who opted to reach Hangzhou by sea, was blown off course and had to return to the Gotō Islands. Ye Ma's band of pirates intercepted a shipment of rice and wine supposedly meant for the Ming army at Jiaxing and made merry. This turned out to a ploy by the Ming, who had poisoned the wine and deliberately left them on the wokou's path. Suffering 700 to 800 casualties to the poison, Ye Ma's band retreated to Songjiang. Chen Dong raided the West Lake region and surrounded the city of Hangzhou, but as his accomplices were not coming, he lifted the siege in the beginning of May 1555 and continued to raid throughout the province of Zhejiang.

To dislodge the pirates, Zhang Jing called in reinforcements from Shandong, Guangxi, and Huguang. 6,000 recruits from Shandong arrived first, but they suffered a devastating defeat and had to disband. Zhang Jing decided to gather his strength and wait for the 11,000 aboriginal "wolf troops" to arrive. However, the apparent lethargy with which Zhang Jing carried out his mission attracted criticism, leading to his undoing. On March 13, 1555, the emperor sent Zhao Wenhua to the wokou-affected regions to perform sacrifices to the sea god and assess the military situation. Zhao Wenhua was a protege of Yan Song, the architect of Xia Yan's downfall who had controlled the imperial court since, so Zhao had considerable influence. Upon arriving, Zhao Wenhua urged Zhang Jing to attack the pirates, but Zhang Jing, who outranked Zhao, resisted and would not even discuss his strategy with him. Zhao Wenhua retaliated by writing a memorial to the throne accusing Zhang Jing of deliberately delaying the operation for his own profit.

However, soon after Zhao Wenhua sent out the memorial, Zhang Jing led his newly arrived aboriginal troops along with generals Lu Tang and Yu Dayou to defeat the pirates at the Battle of Wangjiangjing (王江涇), north of Jiaxing, on 10 May 1555. This victory, where they took 1,900 heads, was the greatest Ming victory so far in the anti-wokou campaign. When the report of the victory reached the emperor, Yan Song convinced the emperor that the victory proved that Zhang Jing had the capability to defeat the pirates and Zhao Wenhua was correct in his accusation that Zhang had been stalling for time, only striking when he heard about Zhao Wenhua's accusation against him. Infuriated, the emperor ordered Zhang Jing's arrest on June 5. The Grand Coordinator of Zhejiang, Li Tianchong, was also arrested for his incompetence and the two of them were executed together on November 12.

Zhang Jing's replacement, Zhou Chong (周珫), had his powers greatly limited compared to his predecessor. Instead of the 6 coastal provinces under Zhang Jing's command, Zhou Chong's was limited to only the Southern Metropolitan Region, Zhejiang, and Fujian. The investigating censor of military affairs in Zhejiang, Hu Zongxian, was promoted to Li Tianchong's position of grand coordinator. Hu was promoted even higher to supreme commander in April 1556, after Zhou Chong and his successor Yang Yi (楊宜) were cashiered after less than a year in service due to their underwhelming performance.

== Supreme Commander Hu Zongxian and the raid of 1556 ==
=== A policy of appeasement ===
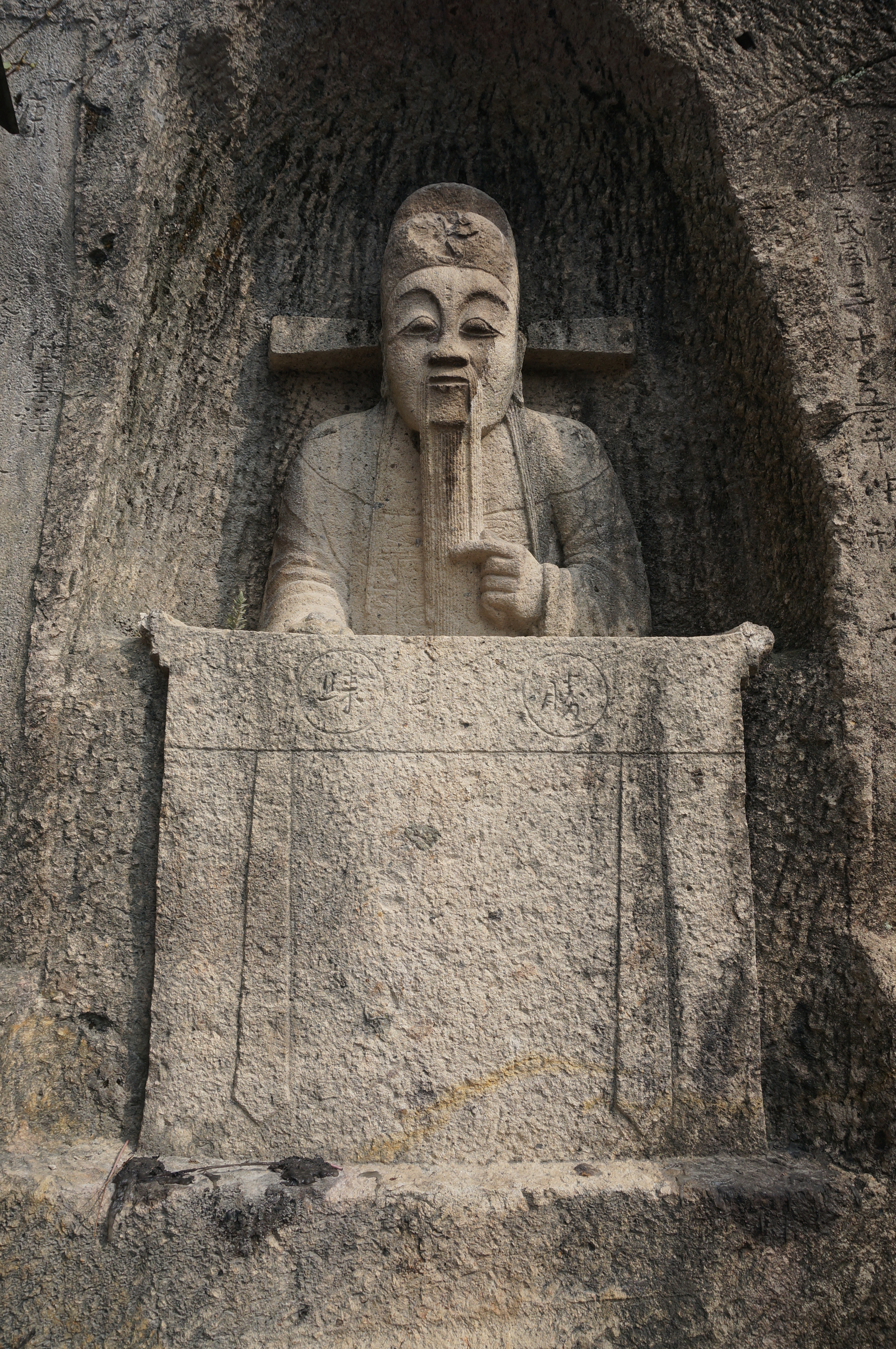
Statue of Hu Zongxian in Yuyao, Zhejiang

Compared to the short appointments of his predecessors, Hu Zongxian remained in power until 1563. His longevity as supreme commander, and indeed his meteoric rise, were due in part to his association with Zhao Wenhua's clique. Zhao Wenhua was opposed to a strict enforcement of the maritime prohibitions like the ones carried out by Zhu Wan, and instead favoured opening trade as the means to solve the wokou problem. Hu Zongxian, in turn, carried out a policy of appeasement despite his subordinates' disapproval and the emperor's orders to capture Wang Zhi dead or alive.

Even before he had become supreme commander, Hu Zongxian sent envoys to Japan in his capacity as grand coordinator ostensibly to request assistance from Japanese authorities, but in fact to establish contact with Wang Zhi to entice him to surrender. Drawn by the prospect of legal trade, Wang Zhi agreed to clean the shores of Zhejiang of pirates in return for a pardon. As a gesture of goodwill, he sent his adopted son Mao Haifeng (毛海峰) to Hu Zongxian while one of Hu's envoys stayed in Japan. Wang Zhi also warned Hu that one of the pirate leaders in his consortium, Xu Hai, was on his way to raid Zhejiang again and Wang was not able to stop him in time. This was alarming news to Hu as it severely disrupted his plans of appeasement, and also he had only about 10,000 men under his command — Zhao Wenhua had disbanded the aboriginal troops that Zhang Jing had assembled after the victory at Wangjiangjing, believing the situation was under control. Far from it, the military situation deteriorated further with raiders on the horizon and the disbanded aboriginal troops turning upon the local villages and the imperial soldiers.

=== The battle of Zaolin and the siege of Tongxiang ===
Xu Hai's raid started with three fleets, each several thousand strong, landing near Yangzhou, Shanghai, and Ningbo. These were later found to be diversionary attacks, meant to draw the Ming defenders away as Xu Hai's main fleet of more than 10,000 men landed at Zhapu, aiming for the great cities of Hangzhou, Suzhou, and the auxiliary capital Nanjing. After defeating the Ming navy at Zhapu, Xu Hai ordered his own seagoing ships to be destroyed, signalling that there would be no turning back. He then rendezvoused with his fellow Satsuma raiders Chen Dong and Ye Ma at Zhelin, their base of operations in 1555. The group then headed inland and went on to plunder the market towns of Wuzhen and Zaolin (皂林) in May 1566. In the latter Xu Hai encountered stiff resistance led by the vastly outnumbered Zong Li (宗禮), who only had 900 soldiers from North China. After three days of battle, Xu Hai himself was wounded and his force was on the verge of defeat, but one final push ended in the slaughter of the government troops, who by this point had run out of supplies and energy. Reinforcements led by Ruan E (阮鶚) did not reach Zaolin in time to relieve Zong Li, and were chased by the victorious raiders to the walled city of Tongxiang.

On May 31, Xu Hai's raiders laid siege to Tongxiang with an arsenal of siege engines at their disposal, including siege towers mounted on boats, wheeled battering rams, and Portuguese breech-loading swivel guns. However, Tongxiang was protected by a new wall that was completed in 1553 and competent defenders who withstood the siege. The attackers eventually lost interest in costly assaults and settled with trying to starve out the defenders. Ruan E sent out strongly worded calls for help in which he denounced Hu Zongxian's policy of appeasement and urged quick action, but Hu Zongxian did not make an effort to relieve the siege other than making a show of force since his men suffered from low morale after the defeat at Zaolin. Instead, Hu withdrew to his headquarters at Hangzhou and tried to negotiate with Xu Hai through intermediaries while he waited for reinforcements.

Xu Hai, wounded and bogged down in the siege, was shocked to hear that Wang Zhi was negotiating his own surrender with Hu Zongxian, and that Mao Haifeng was already helping Hu put down pirates in the Hangzhou Bay. Xu Hai told Hu's agents that while he could be induced to surrender, he could not speak for his ally Chen Dong, upon which the agents bluffed that Chen Dong had already reached an agreement with the government. This made Xu Hai tremendously suspicious of Chen Dong, who grew restless learning that Xu Hai was seeing government agents. Xu Hai eventually agreed to surrender on the condition that Hu Zongxian would secure his pardon and mollify his Japanese followers with gifts. Approximately a month into the siege, Xu Hai released 200 Ming prisoners as a sign of goodwill and withdrew from Tongxiang. Chen Dong found himself abandoned by his ally and angrily attacked Tongxiang for one more day before retreating in another direction.

=== Breakdown of the marauder alliance ===
The retreating raiders made their way to the coast at Zhapu while carrying their plunder with them. Their heavily laden river boats, thousands in number, stretched for miles. They however, did not have the seaworthy vessels to make their escape from China since Xu Hai had theirs destroyed when they first landed. Here Hu Zongxian offered them a deal: all who wished to surrender would be given positions in the military, while all who wished to return to Japan would be provided with seagoing vessels. The raiders had little choice but to accept. Now that Hu Zongxian had Xu Hai by the ear, he incited Xu Hai to attack his fellow marauders north in Songjiang to prove his sincerity. Xu Hai did so, hoping to keep the Songjiang marauders' booty and vessels for himself. As the raider groups fought each other in Zhujing (朱涇), the general Yu Dayou burned the river boats that Xu Hai left behind, and made short work of the remnant Songjiang marauders fleeing from Xu Hai. The operation left Xu Hai stranded and terrified, and he sent gifts and a younger brother as hostage to Hu as reassurance of his surrender.

To break up Xu Hai's power further, Hu Zongxian made use of pre-existing tension among Xu Hai, Chen Dong, and Ye Ma. Xu Hai and Ye Ming had previously quarrelled over a woman they took captive and over the division of their spoils, so Xu Hai had no qualms about luring Ye Ming into a government banquet. Ye Ma, thinking that the ships they were promised were finally ready for delivery, got so drunk at the banquet that he was apprehended by the officials with no trouble. Xu Hai demurred about doing the same to Chen Dong though, since, despite their differences, Chen Dong was a powerful figure in Satsuma, and Xu Hai could not afford to upset his patrons there. Hu Zongxian tried to sway Xu Hai by several means. First he bribed Xu's mistresses to urge him into action. Then he made Ye Ma write a letter to Chen Dong denouncing Xu Hai, then took that letter and gave it to Xu Hai, making Xu believe that there was a conspiracy against him. Finally, Hu forced Xu Hai's hand by giving him an ultimatum: send Chen Dong over or suffer the death penalty. Hearing this, Xu Hai desperately sent his booty "worth more than a thousand gold" to his Japanese patron the Shimazu, asking to borrow Chen Dong's services. When Chen Dong arrived, Xu Hai had him delivered to the authorities. Xu Hai then deceived Chen Dong's followers by saying the ships the government had promised were ready at Zhapu, leading them to the beach. There, seeing the ships arrayed in front of them, Chen's followers scurried onto the ships. Government troops then burst out of their walled positions and slaughtered the disarrayed mob. The few raiders who managed to steer the ships away were rounded up by a naval squadron nearby. By August 1556, Hu Zongxian had, through Xu Hai, eliminated two of the major wokou groups operating in China. All that remained was Xu Hai himself, trapped on the Chinese coast and unable to return to Japan due to his betrayal.

=== Showdown at the Shen Family Estate ===
By this time Hu Zongxian had almost collected his strength: Lu Tang had won a decisive victory in Taizhou south of Ningbo and came back to help deal with Xu Hai; while 6,000 fresh aboriginal soldiers from Baojing and Yongshun were on its way to come to Hu Zongxian's aid. The imperial inspector Zhao Wenhua reiterated the emperor's wishes that surrender was not an option, so Hu Zongxian made a show of receiving Xu Hai's surrender while waiting for the opportune moment to strike. In the meantime Xu Hai had settled in the Shen Family Estate (沈家莊, Shenjiazhuang) of Pinghu, where he recruited up to 300 new followers by hosting banquets for his neighbours, adding to the thousand or more raiders still under his command and remnants of Chen Dong's group next to the estate. He grew increasingly recalcitrant, refusing an invitation to an official Mid-Autumn party and even killing an envoy from Hu Zongxian.

In late September, reinforcements from Baojing and Yongshun arrived and began small-scale skirmishes around the Shen Family Estate. Before commencing the final attack, Hu Zongxian persuaded his captive Chen Dong to write a letter to his followers encamped next to Xu Hai's forces, warning them that Xu Hai was conspiring with government troops to wipe them out in a pincer operation. This provoked Chen Dong's men into attacking Xu Hai's group on September 27, upon which government forces entered the fray from all directions, killing indiscriminately. On September 29, the battle ended with up to 1,600 marauders killed in the estate, and Xu Hai's body was found in a nearby stream. On October 10, Chen Dong, Ye Ma, and Xu Hai's hostage brother were all executed in Jiaxing, marking the end of the wokou invasion of 1556.

== Capture of Wang Zhi ==
Wokou tujuan, an illustrated scroll depicting a wokou raid and the Ming army response in 1558, c. 17th century

With Xu Hai's group put down, Hu Zongxian could focus his efforts in securing Wang Zhi's surrender. Mao Haifeng had been sent back to Wang Zhi to persuade him to come to China in person, as Wang Zhi had never led raids himself. However, in September 1557, when Wang Zhi was preparing to present himself to the authorities to discuss the opening of oversea trade, Zhao Wenhua, the major pusher of an appeasement policy, was accused of embezzlement, lost imperial favour, and died a commoner to illness. The political situation did not allow Hu Zongxian or Yan Song to ask the emperor that Wang Zhi be pardoned.

On 17 October 1557, Wang Zhi arrived at Zhoushan Island with a large trading fleet. There he laid down his terms for surrender: he sought an imperial pardon, a naval commission, and that ports be open for trade; in return he offered to patrol the coast and persuade the raiders to return to the islands through force if necessary. Hu Zongxian now faced a dilemma: he could not let Wang Zhi go, but if he accepted Wang Zhi's surrender he might be forced to execute him, turning appeasement efforts to naught. In December, confident in his prospects and his invulnerability, Wang Zhi made landing at Hangzhou. There he was accorded respectable treatment by the authorities, who feared antagonizing his followers, while they figure out what to do with him. During this time Hu Zongxian asked Wang Zhi to help manufacture arquebuses for the Ming army, which led to the weapon being widely used in China. Finally in February next year, Wang Zhi was sent to prison, where he was given the luxuries of novelties, books, and healthy foods. Wang Zhi believed this was a temporary arrangement and remained hopeful for a pardon until 22 January 1560, when an imperial edict handed down the death sentence and he was summarily beheaded.

By capturing and executing Wang Zhi, the Ming court had hoped to perform a decapitation strike in which his followers would disband. In fact, as officials who supported negotiations had feared, Wang Zhi's followers gave up hope for peaceful trade and went back to their violent ways. Feeling betrayed after Wang Zhi was apprehended, Mao Haifeng made Zhoushan Island his base and launched raids on Zhejiang and Fujian. Hu Zongxian made a concerted effort to dislodge Mao from Zhoushan in March 1558, converging on the island from six directions with the generals Yu Dayou and Qi Jiguang, but failed and was forced to retreat. He tempered the rising criticism against him by blaming Yu and Qi, while sending Beijing a white deer, an auspicious Taoist symbol, to the emperor's great delight. The pirates eventually abandoned Zhoushan in December of the same year owing to the heavy military presence there, and scattered south to Fujian which became their new area of operation. In the summer of 1559, the remaining pirate bands in the Yangtze River Delta were wiped out.

== The end of the wokou crisis ==
=== Military action in Fujian ===
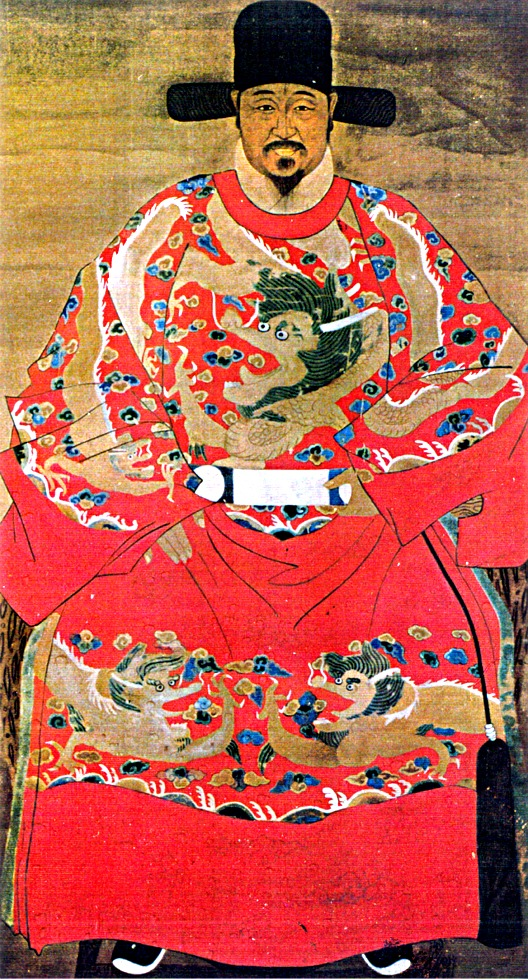
Qi Jiguang

Hu Zongxian turned his attention to Fujian after the situation in Zhejiang settled down. However, as he did so, his ally Yan Song began to fall out of imperial favour and finally lost his position as Senior Grand Secretary in June 1562. In the following purge of Yan's associates, Hu Zongxian was impeached for being too friendly to Wang Zhi and mishandling military funds, among other perceived transgressions. The Jiajing Emperor interceded on his behalf and allowed Hu to retire with all his titles intact in 1563. In any case, Hu Zongxian's supreme commander position overseeing three provinces was considered too powerful especially since the wokou had moved away from the crucial Jiangnan region, so the position was abolished after Hu Zongxian left office — grand coordinators became the paramount figure in those provinces again. Later, in November 1565, new evidence arose incriminating Hu Zongxian of trying to bribe Yan Song's son, and Hu died shortly after while in prison.

In Fujian, Wang Zhi's followers from Zhoushan took over Kinmen and made that island their base to raid up and down the coast in alliance with Cantonese pirates. In December 1562, the prefectural city Xinghua (present-day Putian) was taken after a month-long siege, along with many major towns surrounding it. The general Qi Jiguang was made vice commander while his fellow wokou-fighter Tan Lun was made the Grand Coordinator of Fujian in 1563. Qi Jiguang had by this time assembled his own army from able-bodied farmers of Yiwu and devised the mandarin duck formation (鴛鴦陣) to counter the formidable Japanese contingents among the wokou. This army proved successful in successive battles, and Qi continued to train Fujianese recruits the same way. With his highly disciplined troops, Qi Jiguang retook the city of Xinghua and destroyed the last major pirate base in Fujian by May 1563. Those pirates who had managed to escape and to sail farther south were gradually killed or captured in a series of campaigns conducted in southern Jiangxi and Guangdong between 1564 and 1566. Through these campaigns, the mountainous region between Guangdong, Fujian, and southern Jiangxi, which had been a haven for bandits since the early years of the sixteenth century, was brought under imperial control. By 1567, piracy was no longer seen as a serious threat on the Chinese coast.

=== Legalization of foreign trade ===
While military action suppressed the pirates, a change in Ming maritime policy allowing overseas trade was instrumental in keeping them from rising again. As early as 1530, the maritime prohibitions had in fact been lifted in the southern coastal province of Guangdong, where non-tribute trade was taxed. Provincial authorities had hoped that by opening trade, the economically marginalized of Guangdong would have legitimate livelihoods and would not need to descend into piracy. Indeed, Guangdong was spared from the brunt of the pirate raids during the peak years of wokou activity, and those who had invaded Guangdong were put down with relative ease. In 1554, the provincial authorities entered into an historic agreement with the Portuguese — who came back to Guangdong after their misfortunes at Zhejiang and Fujian — where the Portuguese would be allowed to settle in Macau and trade in Guangzhou for an annual fee. The Portuguese would thence help the Ming destroy pirate fleets in the area, for which they were eventually rewarded with the imperial acknowledgement of their occupation of Macau by the Wanli Emperor (r. 1563–1620). This occupation lasted all the way until 1999, when Macau was handed over to the People's Republic of China.

A few months after the death of the Jiajing Emperor in 1567, the maritime prohibition was officially lifted and Fujian became open to all foreign trade (except the Japanese). The old smuggling port of Yuegang ("Moon Harbour") was renamed to Haicheng (海澄, "clear seas") and was designated the port where this trade was to be conducted in Fujian. Trade with the Japanese, which was expressly forbidden due to their perceived role in the wokou raids, was eventually conducted in third party entities like the Ryukyu Kingdom and Portuguese Macau, which greatly prospered from being the intermediary between Chinese and Japanese merchants. Thus China was finally officially inducted into the global trading network that was being formed in the Age of Discovery.

== Historiography ==
The study of the wokou, especially about their identity, had been controversial over the ages both domestically and internationally. Even whilst the crisis was ongoing in the 16th century, a number of officials had pointed out the inappropriateness of the term "wokou", which means Japanese pirates, to refer to a mostly Chinese phenomenon. Despite some commentators who made a point not to use the term, many had no issue calling all pirates "Wo" (Japanese). For soldiers, cutting off a Japanese head gave a better monetary reward from the government; and for local officials, pretending the pirates were Japanese made them an external problem beyond their responsibilities. Meanwhile, the actual pirates could likewise hide behind the "wokou" label and shift the blame to the Japanese.

The Veritable Records of the Ming, from which the official History of Ming derived, treated the smugglers as pirates and identified the pro-trade ministers such as Yan Song and Zhao Wenhua as "Wo collaborators", leading to the History of Ming placing their biographies under the section "Treacherous Ministers" (奸臣傳). The compiler of the Veritable Records for the Jiajing era, the Senior Grand Secretariat Xu Jie, was keen to denounce his predecessor and political enemy Yan Song in this work, but in doing so he beclouded the whole wokou affair in the histories. Since the History of Ming is among the Twenty-Four Histories, the set of official histories of China, many writers up to the 20th century considered it the authority on the events of the Ming dynasty, including the Jiajing era wokou raids.

The traditional interpretation characterizing the wokou as a Japanese phenomenon carried into the 20th century. During the Second Sino-Japanese War in the 1930s, both Chinese and Japanese writers illustrated the Jiajing wokou using this narrative to instill nationalistic feelings in their respective countries. Japanese writers like Takekoshi Yosaburō, Tomaru Fukuju, and Mogi Shuichiro were more interested in the military aspect of the raids and considered the wokou part of a "noble tradition for the Japanese navy and for Japan's empire-building". Chinese writers of the time like Chen Mouheng and Wu Chonghan likewise blamed the Japanese (and sometimes the "imperialist" Portuguese) as the instigators of the Jiajing wokou raids while their Chinese counterparts were treated as mere traitorous collaborators. Chinese studies of the period also focused on the devastation caused by the wokou and the Ming response without delving too much on the wokou themselves. This narrative prevailed well into the Korean War, when wokou studies again became imbued with patriotic rhetoric. The cultivation of Qi Jiguang as a national hero was a byproduct of the propaganda efforts at the time.

Despite being a minority during the 1930s, Japanese researchers of international diplomacy like Fujita Toyohachi, Akiyama Kenzo, and Kobata Atsushi were keen to point out the link between the piratical activities and foreign trade. This line of interpretation was picked up by Katayama Seijiro and Sakuma Shigeo in the 1950s and 60s who noted that although all coastal pirates were labelled "wokou", the raids were actually carried out by "treacherous merchants" (奸商) and influential families of China. They conclude that the disturbances had its roots in the social and economic changes in Chinese coastal society and were hence not an offshoot of Sino-Japanese diplomacy. Taiwanese historians in the 1960s agreed with this view, adding that the connection between trade and piracy was a result of the Ming prohibition against private sea trade. In the 1970s and 80s, when mainland Chinese scholars were interested in the "sprouts of capitalism" of the mid-to-late Ming dynasty, they followed previous Japanese and Taiwanese scholarship and classified the Jiajing wokou episode as manifestations of anti-feudal and pro-capitalist struggles of the littoral societies. Since then, Chinese writers of this interpretation such as Dai Yixuan, Fan Shuzhi, Lin Renchuan, and Chen Kangsheng are categorized in the "New wokou thesis" school in China.

== Cultural references ==
=== Film ===
The conflict is the subject of several motion pictures, including:

- The Valiant Ones (忠烈圖), a 1975 Hong Kong film directed by King Hu. Among the historical figures depicted in the film is general Yu Dayou (performed by Roy Chiao).
- Great General (戚繼光, Qi Jiguang), a 1978 Taiwanese film directed by Ting Chung, centered around general Qi Jiguang.
- The New Valiant Ones (新忠烈图), a 2006 Hong Kong film directed by Xin Liu. Nicky Wu stars as general Cao Ding.
- God of War (荡寇风云), a 2017 Mainland Chinese film directed by Gordon Chan. Among the depicted historical figures are generals Qi Jiguang (performed by Vincent Zhao) and Yu Dayou (performed by Sammo Hung).

== See also ==
- Naval history of China
- Golden Age of Piracy
