= Zhu Wan =

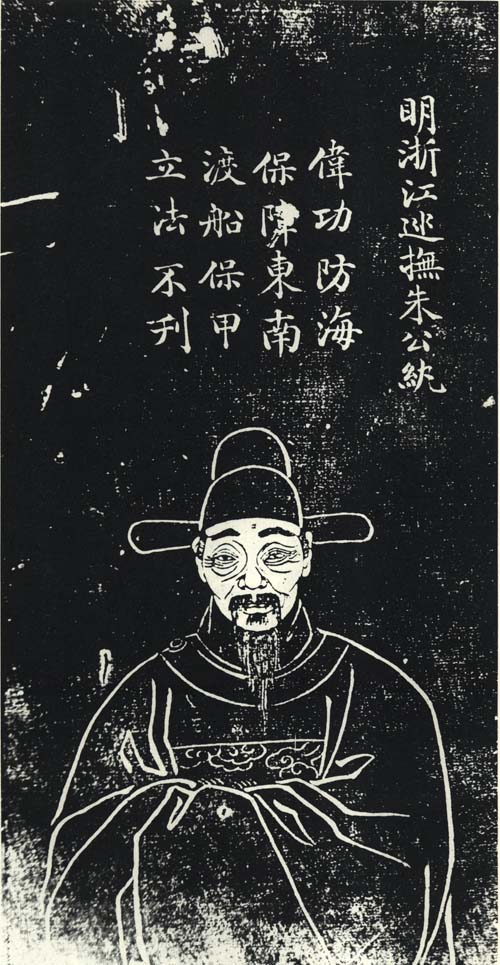
Zhu Wan

Zhu Wan (Chinese: 朱紈; September 29, 1494 – January 2, 1550), courtesy name Zichun (子純) and art name Qiuya (秋崖), was a Chinese general of the Ming dynasty. He was known for his uncompromising stance against the Jiajing wokou pirates (so named because they raided during the Jiajing era) and the gentry members who secretly supported them.

== Early life and career ==
Zhu Wan was born in Changzhou (長洲), now a part of Suzhou, to the schoolteacher Zhu Ang (朱昂) and his concubine surnamed Shi (施). Throughout his upbringing, Zhu Wan and his mother were subject to various abuse by his father's principal wife and his half-brothers. The abuses started three days after he was born when they tried to starve him to death and lasted as late as 1546. His mother shielded him from the abuse when she could and once, an uncle and a cousin intervened to save him from death. Zhu Wan did not mention his father's role in the abuses, but wrote that his father was patient and strict when he taught him the classics and history. These experiences might have formed Zhu Wan's moral code, which was characterized by strict self-discipline and adherence to authority.

Zhu Wan passed the imperial examination and earned a jinshi degree in June 1521, and started his career in the Ming bureaucracy by being an apprentice at the Ministry of Works in Beijing, but he apparently disliked his position and returned home. This short apprenticeship was his only position in the capital over his whole career. In 1522, he was appointed as the subprefecture magistrate of Jingzhou (景州知州), and was transferred to Kaizhou (開州) the next year. From 1527 to 1532, Zhu Wan served several vice-director and director positions in the secondary capital Nanjing under the Ministry of Justice (南刑部), Ministry of War (南兵部), and Ministry of Personnel (南吏部).

== Provincial commissions ==
In 1532, Zhu Wan was transferred from the metropolitan areas to the provinces, where he remained until his death. He was first sent to Jiangxi, where he served as assistant administration commissioner (江西布政司右參議) and dealt with Dongxiang inhabitants who resisted mandatory labour service. He then was sent to Sichuan as surveillance vice commissioner (四川按察司副使) in 1536, where he restructured local defences and put down the Maozhou (茂州) and Weizhou aboriginal bandits militarily, putting a stop to the previous practice of paying them off. He recorded his Sichuan experiences in his Maobian Jishi (茂邊紀事).

In 1541 he was appointed as administration vice commissioner of Shandong (山東左參政), where he released Shandong soldiers from faraway duties so they could bolster local defences. He was then sent to the southwestern province of Yunnan in 1543 as surveillance commissioner (雲南按察司) but came back to Shandong as administration commissioner (山東右布政使) the next year. This was followed by his transfer to the same position in Guangdong (廣東左布政使) in 1545, but even this commission was short-lived since he was promoted again one year later.

== As grand coordinator ==
In 1546 Zhu Wan was assigned as the grand coordinator of southern Jiangxi (南贛巡撫), a post roughly equivalent to a provincial governor and above commissioners of the military, provincial, and surveillance hierarchies. However, he was soon transferred to the coastal province of Zhejiang the next year, as it was undergoing a military emergency in the form of the wokou pirates.

After several years of debate over the disturbances on the coast, the Ming court under Senior Grand Secretary Xia Yan decided to appoint a new grand coordinator to manage coastal defense in the two provinces most affected by the turbulence, Zhejiang and Fujian. In 1547, Zhu Wan was made the Grand Coordinator of Zhejiang and Concurrent Superintendent of Military Affairs for Zhejiang and Fujian Coastal Defense (巡撫浙江兼提督浙閩海防軍務), a new position specifically created to deal with the resurgent wokou problem. It was the first time in many decades that Zhejiang had a single administrative head instead of having three provincial heads.

The situation on the coast had become very dire at the start of Zhu Wan's tenure as grand coordinator. In December 1547, the Portuguese had plundered Zhangzhou, and in February the next year the cities of Ningbo and Taizhou were struck by an unprecedented 1,000 raiders aboard a hundred ships. This raid happened whilst Zhu Wan was inspecting in Fujian, and the government troops could not stop the raiders from killing, looting, and burning government offices and homes. Despite the dismal state of coastal defence and the widespread collusion between the gentry and the pirates, Zhu Wan carried out his task energetically. He strictly enforced the maritime prohibitions, forbidding anyone from venturing out to sea on penalty of death, and put all ships to use for defence of the coast. He also publicized the names of the influential persons involved in the illegal trade, to the annoyance of the local gentry. However, Zhu Wan was not entirely against foreign trade as he accommodated an official Japanese trading mission led by Sakugen Shūryō in early 1548—he had no problem with foreign trade in principle as long as it was done through the proper channels.

On 15 April 1548, Zhu Wan's fleet in Wenzhou set sail for the pirate haven Shuangyu under the command of Lu Tang and Ke Qiao (柯喬). The fleet descended onto Shuangyu one night in June, under the cover of thick weather. Fifty-five to a few hundred smugglers perished in the attack, but leading figures such as Li Guangtou (李光頭) and Wang Zhi were able to escape. Lu Tang then razed the town and rendered the harbour permanently unusable by filling it in with stones under Zhu Wan's orders. Zhu Wan and his generals were greatly rewarded in silver for the victory, but he also drew the ire of his political enemies among the gentry, whose profits were directly affected by the destruction of Shuangyu. Eventually a pretense was found to demote Zhu Wan to the temporary position of inspector general (巡視), the argument being one man cannot control two provinces at the same time.

== Downfall and death ==
After the loss of Shuangyu, the smugglers scattered along the coast of Zhejiang and Fujian to find good hideouts to trade. The deep water inlet of Zoumaxi (走馬溪, "Running Horse Creek") by the Dongshan Peninsula near the Fujian-Guangdong border was found to be a suitable place for trade since the terrain sheltered the ships from the winds, and the inhabitants of nearby Meiling (梅嶺) had been greatly involved in the illicit trade. On 19 March 1549, Lu Tang and Ke Qiao ambushed two junks in Zoumaxi while they were trading with the Portuguese aboard resulting in 33 deaths and 206 smugglers captured. Among the captured were Li Guangtou and a number of Portuguese men, and Lu Tang had four of the more good-looking Portuguese pretend to be kings of Malacca in order to make the victory seem more complete. Fearing that the captives might bribe their way out, Zhu Wan executed 96 of the Chinese smugglers using his discretionary powers.

Zhu Wan's unauthorized executions of the Zoumaxi captives provided an excellent opportunity for his political enemies. On April 27, Zhu Wan was impeached for exceeding his authority since executions had to be sanctioned by the emperor. The Jiajing Emperor dismissed Zhu Wan from his post and ordered a full investigation on the matter. Seeing that the odds were against him, especially since his backer Xia Yan had been executed in disgrace in October last year, Zhu Wan wrote his own epitaph and committed suicide by drinking poison in January 1550. The investigation confirmed the allegations that Zhu Wan had killed the prisoners without imperial authorization, and so a posthumous death sentence was handed down. Lu Tang and Ke Qiao were also condemned to death, and the Portuguese smugglers were let off lightly, with exile as their punishment.

The death of Zhu Wan was followed by the wholesale reversion of his policies, and the fleet that Zhu had assembled was dispersed. For three years the position held by Zhu Wan remained vacant, and during these years apparently no government official dared to mention the coastal situation in the adverse political atmosphere. The coastal gentry had come out on top over Zhu Wan, but in doing so they created a military vacuum on the Chinese coast, of which the wokou raiders took full advantage when they intensified their raids for the coming decade. Contemporaries and later historians lamented Zhu Wan's fate for his righteousness and steadfast resistance against the influential families, and his name was finally cleared by the Wanli Emperor in December 22, 1587.

== Notes ==
New creation	Grand coordinator of Zhejiang; 1547 – 1548	Vacant Title next held by Wang Yu
