= Xu Hai =

Chinese pirate (died 1556)

- 徐海
- Born: Huizhou
- Died: 1556; Zhapu, Zhejiang
- Piratical career
- Nickname: Generalissimo commissioned by heaven to pacify the oceans (天差平海大將軍)
- Years active: 1551–1556
- Base of operations: South and East China Seas
- Battles: Jiajing wokou raids

Chinese name
- Chinese: 徐海
Transcriptions
Standard Mandarin
- Hanyu Pinyin: Xú Hǎi

Xu Hai (died 1556) was a Chinese pirate leader in the 16th century and one of the commanders of the wokou pirates and smugglers active along the Chinese coast.

== Biography ==
Xu Hai was from Huizhou, a city in southern Anhui Province. He became a Buddhist monk at Hupao Temple in Hangzhou (or, according to some sources, at Lingyin Temple). In 1551, he left the temple and joined the wokou pirates, who were notorious for raiding the coast of Ming China. His reputation grew due to his divination and foresight, and by the early 1550s, he had risen to become one of their leaders. He was based in Satsuma Province, in southern Kyushu, Japan, and his forces consisted mainly of Japanese individuals from Satsuma, Izumi, and Hizen provinces.

In 1555, the wokou pirates launched a large-scale attack that affected most of Zhejiang province and the southern metropolitan area of Nanzhili (around Songjiang). Xu's detachment was the strongest of the groups participating in the raid, but his forces also suffered heavy losses in the Battle of Wangjiangjing, where 1,900 pirates were killed. In the spring of 1556, Xu attempted another attack on Zhejiang, but the Ming authorities were alerted when another pirate leader, Wang Zhi, informed them of Xu's plans. This information was part of negotiations with Hu Zongxian, the commander of the Ming forces in Nanzhili, Zhejiang, and Fujian.

When Xu arrived on the coast, he joined forces with the Satsuma pirates Chen Dong (陳東) and Ye Ma (葉麻) to lay siege to Zhapu in northern Zhejiang. Upon hearing news of the mobilization of government forces, Xu moved inland to the border of Songjiang, Huzhou, and Jiaxing prefectures in order to take advantage of the situation and plunder the surrounding regions. Hu withdrew his troops closer to the pirates, but Xu launched a surprise attack and defeated a government troop of 900 soldiers commanded by Zong Li. Despite their initial success, the pirates were unable to capture the nearby county town of Tongxiang, where the Ming forces were led by the Grand Coordinator of Zhejiang, Yuan Wu, and the local county magistrate. Despite having siege weapons and artillery, the pirates were unsuccessful in their attempts to take the city, and tensions began to rise between Xu and Chen. Taking advantage of this rift, Hu established contact with both leaders and sowed seeds of distrust between them. Through bribes, false promises of official status, and the offer of a chance to sail back to Japan, Hu was able to turn Xu against his allies. He also spread false rumors of a rebellion among Xu's subordinates and even went as far as to bribe Xu's mistresses to slander Chen and Ye. Xu turned on his former allies and handed them over to the authorities. Hu then had Chen and Ye write letters to their loyalists, falsely claiming that Xu was planning to betray and kill them. At the same time, he gave Xu copies of these letters, making Xu believe that Hu was defending his interests. Chen and Ye's followers in Pinghu rebelled against Xu. Hu quickly joined the fray with his army, which was reinforced by newly arrived Miao warriors. In the ensuing battle on 29 September, approximately 1,600 pirates were killed. Xu's body was found in a nearby stream, and Chen, Ye, and Xu's brother were all executed in Jiaxing on 10 October.

== See also ==
- Wang Cuiqiao
- The Tale of Kieu
