= Rada Manufacturing =

Cutlery company in Iowa

Rada Manufacturing Co.
- Rada Manufacturing building
- Founded: 1948
- Headquarters: Waverly, Iowa
- Key people: Phil Jones, President; Gary Nelson, CEO
- Products: Knives & kitchen utensils
- Services: Fundraising, Independent Sales, Personal Sales
- Owner: Family owned
- Number of employees: 100 (2019)
- Website: radacutlery.com

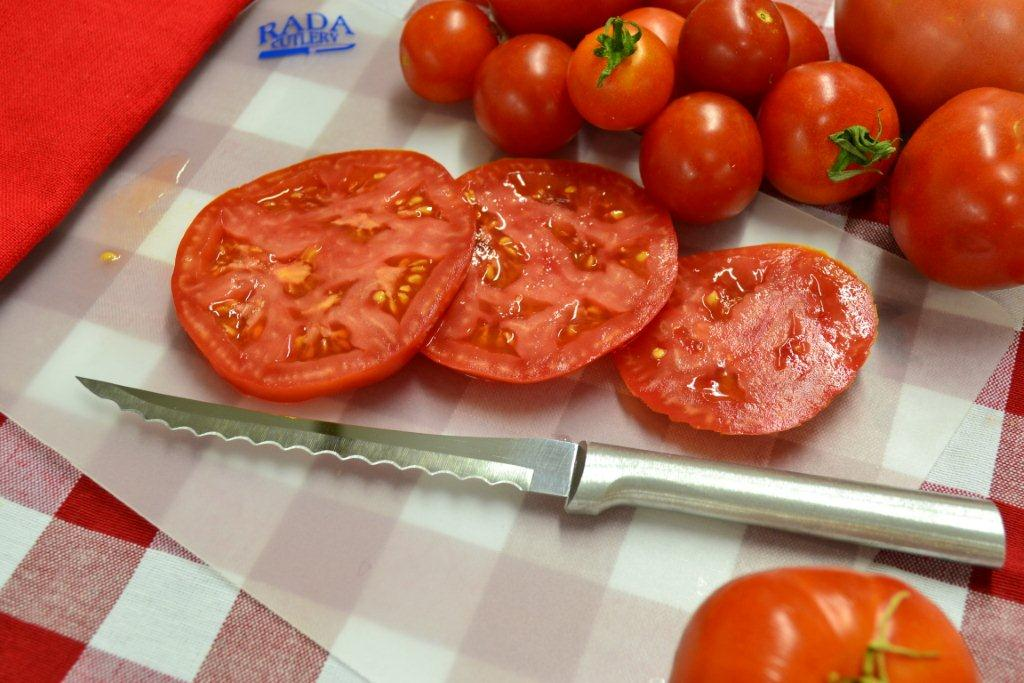
Tomato slicer showing Rada's iconic aluminum handle

Rada Manufacturing is a manufacturer located in Waverly, Iowa. It is the maker of Rada Cutlery. The company has been manufacturing American-made cutlery since being founded in 1948 and manufactures their products 100% in the USA. They are known for the solid aluminum handles on their cutlery, their lifetime guarantee, and for their aid to fundraisers for over 70 years.

As of 2020, Gary Nelson is chairman and CEO, and Phil Jones is president.

== History ==
Rada Cutlery was first produced in 1948, using surplus military knife blades then available at a fraction of their value. Early on, Rada utilized various buildings to meet their needs. One was a fortified military radar base used to monitor air space during the Cold War. In 1969, manufacturing operations moved to the current facility in Waverly, Iowa which has since been expanded.
