= Irena Radová =

Czech philologist

Doc. Mgr. Irena Radová Ph.D.
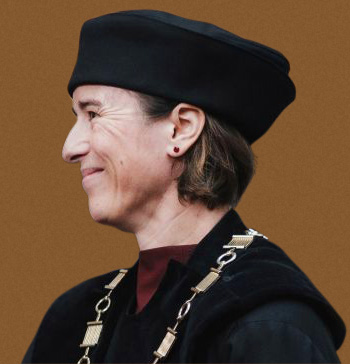
- Born: 3 September 1975; Kyjov, Czechoslovakia

Academic background
- Education: Masaryk University

Academic work
- Discipline: Classical Philology
- Institutions: Masaryk University

Irena Radová (born 3 September 1975) is a Czech classical philologist. She is dean of the Faculty of Arts at Masaryk University.

== Career ==
Radová studied Latin, German and Greek at Masaryk University, Brno, where she received her doctorate in 2003, with a thesis Zpracování mýtu o Argonautech v díle Apollónia Rhodského a Valeria Flakka. Since 2004, Radová has worked in the Department of Classical Studies in the Faculty of Arts at Masaryk University. In 2010, she was awarded a habilitation for Genologická typologie starořeckých scholií, published in 2011 as Altgriechische Scholien. Ein typologischer Versuch. From 2022 to 2026 Radová is dean of the Faculty of Arts.

In 2015, Radová published the first translation of the Argonautica of Valerius Flaccus into Czech.

== Publications ==
- 2015. Valerius Flaccus. Argonautica. 1. vyd. Prague: Arista, Baset. (Antická knihovna; sv. 84)
- 2011. Altgriechische Scholien. Ein typologischer Versuch. Prague: Koniasch Latin Press. ISBN 978-80-86791-58-6.
- 2004. Dobrodružství Argonautů: Řecko versus Řím. Prague: Koniasch Latin Press. ISBN 80-86791-15-7
