= Rada (given name) =

Rada is a feminine given name. Notable people with the name include:

- Rada Akbar (born 1988), Afghan-born visual artist, and photographer
- Rada Borić (born 1951), Croatian scholar, feminist and women's rights activist
- Rada Dyson-Hudson, American anthropologist
- Rada Granovskaya, Russian psychologist
- Rada Iveković, Croatian professor, philosopher, Indologist and writer
- Rada Laykova, Bulgarian politician
- Rada Lysenko, Ukrainian pianist and pedagogue, granddaughter of Mykola Lysenko
- Rada Manojlović (born 1985), Serbian pop folk singer
- Rada Mihalcea, Romania-born American computer scientist
- Rada Owen (born 1978), American swimming coach and former swimmer
- Rada Rassimov (born 1938), Italian actress
- Rada Todorova, Bulgarian politician
- Rada Trajković, Kosovo Serb politician
- Rada Vidović (born 1979), Serbian basketball player
- Rada Vranješević (1918–1944), Yugoslav political activist and World War II resistance leader
