= Martín de Rada =

Spanish missionary (1533–1578)

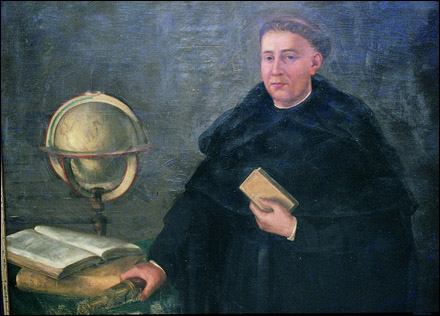
Martín de Rada, portrait by Victor Villán in 1879

Martín de Rada (June 30, 1533 - June 12, 1578) was one of the first members of the Order of Saint Augustine (OSA) to spread the Christian doctrine in the Philippines, as well as one of the first Christian missionaries to visit Ming China.

== Early years ==
He was born in Pamplona, Spain, on July 20, 1533, to León de Rada and Margarita de Cruzat. At the age of twelve he was sent by his parents to the University of Paris along with his older brother. He was an outstanding student of the sciences but was forced to return home because of hostilities between France and Spain. He continued his studies at the University of Salamanca, where he joined the Augustinians and made his religious vows on November 21, 1554. The King granted him the priory of Ujué and the abbey of La Oliva in recognition of the services that his parents and grandparents had provided to the Crown.

In 1560, he volunteered to work in New Spain (Mexico), a decision he reached while assigned at the Augustinian monastery in Toledo. Alonso de la Vera Cruz, OSA, an educator who established in Mexico the first university in the New World, later wrote that de Rada was "a man of uncommon talent, a good theologian and an eminence in mathematics. ..."

In Mexico, de Rada was assigned to study the Otomi language, and was successfully speaking it after only five months in the area. He went on to write instructional sermons and a book in that language. The talents and administrative abilities of de Rada were noted not only by the Augustinian leaders in Mexico but also by his superiors in Spain.

== Voyage to the Philippines ==
When in 1564 Augustinians were being chosen to accompany Andrés de Urdaneta, OSA, on the royal expedition to the Philippines that was to sail from Mexico under the command of Don Miguel López de Legazpi, his Father Provincial (or regional religious superior) in Spain asked that de Rada should stay in Mexico "until it is known about the success of the armada" (that is, the success of Legazpi's armed fleet in its attempt to reach and colonize the Philippines).

As it happened, de Rada had already sailed in the Legazpi expedition before the Provincial's letter reached Mexico. The Legazpi expedition reached Cebu in the Philippines on April 27, 1565.

When on June 1, 1565, Urdaneta, accompanied by Andrés de Aguirre, OSA, began his historic return voyage of exploration to Mexico, de Rada remained in the Philippines with Diego de Herrera, OSA, and Pedro de Gamboa, OSA. The trio quickly learned the local Cebuano language.

De Rada remained at Cebu from 1565 to 1572, earning him a place in history as "the apostle of the Christian Faith in Cebu." In 1566-67, he also made voyages to adjacent islands, mainly Panay, and preached there as well. In 1572 he became the Augustinian regional superior in the Philippines.

While in Cebu, de Rada had begun to study Chinese. In 1574, he acted as an interpreter to a group of Chinese merchants who visited Manila. He later proposed a plan to conquer China that was never realized.

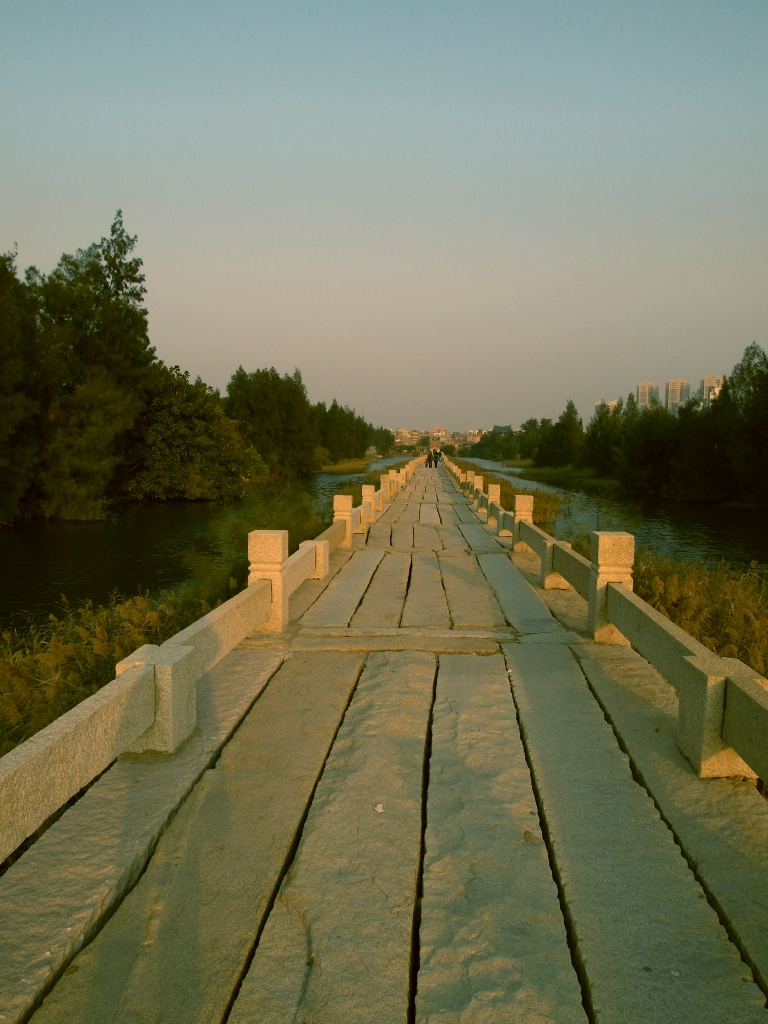
Anping Bridge is one of the grand bridges that de Rada's delegation used on its way from Amoy to Fuzhou.

On June 26, 1575, de Rada and Jeronimo Marin, OSA, accompanied a delegation of officials to China. They reached the port of Amoy (Xiamen) in Hokkien province on July 5, and visited a number of cities. The group returned to Manila on October 28, 1575.

De Rada wrote detailed observations on the Chinese people and their way of life. In 1578 de Rada was once again placed on an expedition by the governor of Manila; this was to Borneo, where there was rivalry within the family of the sultan.

The expedition sailed from Manila on March 3, 1578, but was not successful. On the return voyage many people in the expedition got sick. De Rada was one of those less fortunate, and died at sea on the 12th of June shortly before the ship reached Manila. He was only forty-five years of age.

== Legacies ==
De Rada is much remembered as a great defender of the Filipino people against injustice of Spanish officials at the local level. A key document in this matter was his Parescer del Provincial fray Martin de Rada, agostino, sobre las coasa de estas tieras ("About the abuses committed against the natives in the collection of tributes"), dated at Manila, June 21, 1574.

== See also ==
- Gaspar da Cruz, a Dominican who visited China some years prior to de Rada
- Juan González de Mendoza, whose book (1585) is largely based on de Rada's account of his expedition to China and the materials he had brought from there
- Boxer Codex (1590), also based on books brought over by de Rada from China and illustrations of accounts possibly personally instructed by de Rada.
- Juan Cobo (ca. 1546–1592), a Spanish Dominican in the Philippines who embarked on the work of translating to and from Chinese a decade after de Rada's death

== Sources ==
- "Martin de Rada". Augnet. Augustinian Australia.
- Boxer, Charles Ralph (1953). South China in the Sixteenth Century(1550-1575) (Reprint 2017 Taylor & Francis ed.). Hakluyt Society. ISBN 9781317052241.
- Fernández, Jesús Álvarez. "Martín de Rada Cruzat". Real Academia de la Historia (in Spanish).
- Howgego, Raymond John, ed. (2003). "Rada, Martin de". Encyclopedia of Exploration to 1800. Hordern House. p. 875. ISBN 1875567364.
- Mendoza, Juan González de (1853), Mendoza's Historie of the Kingdome of China, vol. 1, Translated by Robert Parke, Hakluyt Society; Mendoza, Juan González de (1854), Mendoza's Historie of the Kingdome of China, vol. 2, Translated by Robert Parke, Hakluyt Society. These two volumes are a reprint of the 1588 English edition, edited by Sir George T. Staunton, Bart.; introduction by Richard Henry Major. Mendoza's work is largely based on de Rada's account of his China trip and on the books he had bought in China.
- Policarpo F. Hernández, OSA, "A Church Built for the Ages Fuses Two Alien Cultures," in Search, The Augustinian Journal of Cultural Excellence (Makati) I (2004), pp. 45–55.
- Portuondo, María (2005). Secret Science: Spanish Cosmography and the New World (PDF). Bibcode:2005PhDT........16P. Archived from the original (PDF) on 2017-11-18.
