= Chaophraya Phitsanulok =

18th-century governor of the Thai city of Phitsanulok

Rueang, King of Phitsanulok
- เจ้าพระยาพิษณุโลก (Rueang Rochanakul)

King of Phitsanulok
- Reign: 1768
- Predecessor: Enthroned
- Successor: Phraya Chaiyabun (Chan)
- Regent: Chaophraya Chakri (Thongdi) (later Somdet Phra Prathom Borom Maha Rajchanok)

Governor of Phitsanulok
- Reign: 1732 – 7 April 1767
- Predecessor: Chaophraya Phitsanulok (Mek) (1708–1732)
- Successor: Maha Sura Singhanat (1770–1803)
- Born: Rueang (also known as Ruang); 1719; Ayutthaya, Ayutthaya Kingdom
- Died: November 1768 †; Phitsanulok, Thonburi Kingdom
- Wife: Lady Qingchiang

Chinese name
- Chinese: 扶世祿
Transcriptions
Standard Mandarin
- Hanyu Pinyin: fú shì lù
Yue: Cantonese
- Jyutping: fu2 shi4 lu4

Thai name
- Thai: เจ้าพระยาสุรสีห์พิศณุวาธิราช ชาติพัทยาธิเบศวราธิบดี อภัยพิริยบรากรมภาหุ
- RTGS: Chao Phraya Surasi Phitsanuwathirat Chatiphatyathibetwarathipbodi Aphaiphiriyaborakromphahu

Chaophraya Phitsanulok (Thai: เจ้าพระยาพิษณุโลก, pronounced [tɕâw pʰráʔ jaː pʰít sàːʔ núʔ lôːk]; 1719 – November 1768), personal name Rueang (Note: rendered into Latin alphabet denoted by the Royal Thai General System of Transcription (RTGS), Royal Institute of Thailand. Other Thai government document rendered as Ruang) (Thai: เรือง) or Boonrueang (Thai: บุญเรือง), was governor of Phitsanulok with the noble title Chaophraya Surasi Bisanuvadhiraj (Thai: เจ้าพระยาสุรสีห์พิษณุวาธิราช) from 1732 to 1767. He was governor from the reign of King Borommakot, until the fall of the Ayutthaya Kingdom during the reign of King Ekkathat.

In 1768, he declared himself King Rueang of Phitsanulok, claiming for Phitsanulok and part of Nakhon Sawan to be a new independent state. He was also known as Prince Rueang, the King of Siam. His descendants were given the Thai noble surname Rochanakul (Thai: โรจนกุล), a patronymic from Rueang's family, by King Rama VI.

== Biography ==
=== Ancestry ===
Rueang was born in the Ayutthaya Kingdom. He descended from Chaophra Pichayasurindara (Thai: เจ้าพระพิไชยสุรินทร์), the grandson of King Phetracha, in Ban Phlu Luang dynasty, and later H.R.H. Prince of Krommamun Indarabhakdi (Thai: พระเจ้าหลานเธอ กรมหมื่นอินทรภักดี) conferred by King Thai Sa era. His wife was Lady Qingchiang (Thai: จึงเชียง), lady of Phitsanulok (Thai: ท่านผู้หญิงพิษณุโลก), a half-Siamese-Chinese woman of the Chen family, and a daughter of Phraya Rajsubhawadi (Thai: พระยาราชสุภาวดี (โกวผก)), from a Chinese village in Ayutthaya. His younger brother was deputy governor of Phitsanulok, Phra Indara-akorn (Thai: พระอินทรอากร), or Phraya Chaiyabun (Thai: พระยาไชยบูรณ์), personal name Chan (Thai: จัน). His mother died after the second fall of the Ayutthaya Kingdom.

=== Early career ===
In his early life, Rueang was in charge of Siamese military affairs and also worked as a scribe in Krom Mahatthai of the Ayutthaya Kingdom during King Thai Sa's rule.

In his adolescence, he was mostly in military service at Phitsanulok, coordinating officially with Luang Pinit Akson (Thongdi) (Thai: หลวงพินิจอักษร (ทองดี)). Later, he became the permanent secretary of Phitsanulok (Thai: พระปลัดเมืองพระพิษณุโลก).

In adulthood, after the previous governor of Phitsanulok died, King Borommakot appointed Rueang as governor of Phitsanulok and granted him the title Chaophraya Surasi Bisanuvadhiraj.(Thai: เจ้าพระยาสุรสีห์พิษณุวาธิราช. He was a regent of the northern region. During the Burmese-Siamese War (1765–1767), Rueang was appointed commander of northern military affairs. He had a reputation as a famous elder warrior, and was respected by many Ayutthaya courtiers following the successful defeat of Burmese royal troops who attacked Phisanulok city during the Burmese–Siamese War.

In The Royal Sword, by the Ministry of Interior (Thailand), it was said that:

"นักประวัติศาสตร์กล่าวว่าเจ้าพระยาพิษณุโลก (เรือง) เป็นแม่ทัพที่มีฝืมือเข้มแข็งเป็นที่ไว้วางพระราชหฤทัยมาก เป็นข้าราชการภูมิภาคผู้เดียวที่มีศักดิ์และอำนาจเหนือข้าราชการหัวเมืองอื่น ๆ ที่คุมทัพเข้ามาช่วยป้องกันกรุง... ...ในบรรดาแม่ทัพนายกองที่เป็นข้าราชการหัวเมืองแล้ว เจ้าพระยาพิษณุโลก (เรือง) มีฐานันดรศักดิ์สูงกว่าทุกคน เพราะเป็นผู้ครองเมืองพิษณุโลก ซึ่งเป็นศูนย์การปกครองของหัวเมืองเหนือทั้งหมด ปรากฏว่าในระหว่างป้องกันกรุงศรีอยุธยาคราวนั้น เจ้าพระยาพิษณุโลก (เรือง) ได้ทำการต่อสู้พม่าอย่างเข้มแข็งมาก จนได้รับแต่งตั้งให้บัญชาการกองทัพที่ตั้งต่อสู้อยู่นอกกำแพงพระนคร... ...ถ้าหากได้บุคคลที่มีความสามารถ เช่น เจ้าพระยาพิษณุโลก (เรือง) ไปควบคุมบังคับบัญชาแล้วอาจป้องกันทัพพม่า หรือตีทัพพม่าให้แตกพ่ายไปได้...เข้าใจว่า เจ้าพระยาพิษณุโลก (เรือง) เป็นข้าราชการที่ดีที่สุดคนหนึ่งในสมัยนั้น... ...เมื่อยามเจ้าพระยาพิษณุโลก (เรือง) สถาปนาเป็นกษัตริย์ในเวลาต่อมา ก็บุญน้อยหรือกรรมตามทัน ถึงแก่พิราลัยไปเสียก่อน จึงมิได้รื้อฟื้นกันขึ้นมาพิจารณาว่า การกระทำในครั้งนั้นเป็นการสมควรหรือไม่ และผิดถูกเพียงใด."

(Translation): Thai historians said that Chaophraya Phitsanulok (Rueang) was a strong and proficient commander-in-chief, highly trusted by King of Siam, who had superior honor and power than other regional governors of cities whom them being appointed to command army forces. His rank of title nobility, the governor of Phitsanulok as central administration of all northern cities, was higher compared to the others. During Burmese-Siamese War, Chaophraya Phitsanulok (Rueang) was engaged skilfully with Burmese troops, finally he gets appointed as commander-in-chief, operating outer of Ayutthaya city wall. If there was a strong proficient nobleman e.g., Chaophraya Phitsanulok (Rueang) to command Siamese army forces, it was possible to protect from and to engage with Burmese troops. Said that, Chaophraya Phitsanulok (Rueang) was one of the best noblemen in the Ayutthaya Kingdom. It might be bad luck or a just retribution that he passed away soon after proclaimed himself as King of Siam. and therefore, it never has been taken his enthronement into account to judge that was appropriate or not? either right or wrong.

— Ministry of Interior (Thailand), The Royal Sword, (1966).

=== Death ===
In 1768, after the second fall of the Ayutthaya Kingdom interregnum, Chaophraya Phitsanulok (Rueang) proclaimed himself King Ruang, to be King of Siam. He occupied the throne for only six months (some sources said he died only seven days after the ceremony) and died in November 1768 of a coughing fit. Various sources said he died of abscess, scrofula, or smallpox symptoms when he was forty-nine years old., while others said he was fifty-two years old at the time of death. His younger-brother, Phraya Chaiyabun (Chan), ruled Phitsanulok city afterward.

== Burmese Invasion and the second fall of Ayutthaya Kingdom ==
=== Resistance ===
==== Background ====
Lan Na (Thailand's history, preferably called Chiang Mai) was in apparent rebellion against the Burmese royal court during 1761–1763, when it was state-independent and under the reign of Phraya Chantha (Thai: พญาจันท์) and the support of the military of the Ayutthaya Kingdom. According to the allegation of the Burmese King's lèse-majesté, King Naungdawgyi, the King of Burma deployed troops of 50,000 men and appointed General Ne Myo Thihapate as commander-in-chief to criminalize Chiang Mai.

==== Chiang Mai defeated by Burmese troops ====
In January 1762, Phraya Chantha of Chiang Mai wrote a royal letter with a tribute presented to King Ekkathat, the King of Siam, informing him of an invasion from Burma and requesting that Chiang Mai become a tributary state of Siam and for Siamese troops to fight against the Burmese troops.

King Ekkathat deployed Siamese troops of 5,000 men and appointed Chaophraya Phitsanulok (Rueang) as commander-in-chief. Once Phitsanulok's army arrived at Ban Rahaeng (Thai: บ้านระแหง) located in Tak city, approximately 280 km south of Chiang Mai,. However, Chiang Mai was already defeated by Burmese troops within 4–5 months, and Abyagamani (Burmese: အဘယဂါမဏိ) (Thai: โป่อภัยคามินี or อะปะยะกามณี or พญาอภัยคามินี) was appointed to rule Chiang Mai, the state colony of Burma. King Ekkathat acknowledged that and then stated a royal order to discharge Phitsanulok troops.

The Royal Chronicle of the Kingdom of Ayutthaya said :

"ฝ่ายพญาจันท์เมืองเชียงใหม่ จึ่งให้มีศุภอักษรลงมาขอพึ่งพระบรมโพธิสมภาร จะฃอกองทับขึ้นไปช่วยป้องกันพม่าข้าศึก สมุหนายกกราบบังคมทูล จึ่งทรงพระกรุณาดำหรัดสั่งให้เกนกองทับหัวเมืองฝ่ายเหนือเปนคน ๕๐๐๐ โปรดให้เจ้าพญาสุรศรีเจ้าเมืองพระพิศณุโลกเปนแม่ทับ ยกไปถึงตำบลบ้านระแหง ได้ข่าวว่าเมืองเชียงใหม่เสียกับพม่าแล้ว ก็บอกลงมาให้กราบบังคมทูลให้ทราบ จึ่งโปรดให้สมุหนายกมีตราขึ้นไปให้หากองทับกลับ"

(Translation): "Phraya Chantha of Chiang Mai sent a royal letter requesting King Ekkathat's assistance with Siamese troops to protect Chiang Mai from an attack by Burmese troops. The Supreme Chancellor of Krom Mahatthai told King Ekkathat; the King then stated a royal order to array a group of expeditionary troops of 5,000 men, northern city, and appointed Chaophraya Surasi, governor of Phitsanulok [Chaophraya Phitsanulok (Rueang)] as commander-in-chief for battle. Since the expeditionary Phitsanulok's troops marched to Tambon Ban Rahaeng, Chiang Mai had already been seized by Burmese troops. The news was relayed to King Ekkathat, who stated to discharge the Siamese troops."

— The Royal Chronicle of the Kingdom of Ayutthaya : Version by Somdet Phra Phonnarat of Wat Phra Chettuphon.

On November 28, 1762, King Alaungpaya died. To uphold Alaungpaya's wish, King Hsinbyushin assembled Burmese troops of 20,000 men to reinforce his troops in Chiang Mai. General Ne Myo Thihapate was appointed to control the troops and a number of courtiers were also appointed in readiness for marching to Ayutthaya Kingdom.

The Royal Chronicle of Myanmar composed in 1913 A.D. by Prince Narathip Praphanphong said :

"ลุวันที่ ๗ เดือนกุมภาพันธ์ พ.ศ. ๒๓๐๖ ก็ตรัสให้สีหปตีเป็นแม่ทัพคุมพล ๒๐๐๐๐ ขึ้นไปเพิ่มเติมกองทัพอันตั้งอยู่ ณ นครเชียงใหม่แล้ว ทรงตั้งขุนนางใหม่อันเป็นที่ไว้วางพระราชหฤทัย ออกไปครอบหัวเมืองทั้งปวงในพระราชอาณาจักรทั่วทุกเขตแขวง รวมทั้งหัวเมืองไทยใหญ่ข้างเหนือพระนครด้วย."

(Translation): "On 7 February 1763, King Hsinbyushin appointed General Ne Myo Thihapate to be commander-in-chief so that he could control the Burmese reinforcement-expeditionary army of 20,000 men to Chiang Mai, then appointed a number of trusted noblemen as city's governor all across the Burmese Kingdom, territories, and states, including northern Shan State."

— Prince Narathip Praphanphong, The Royal Chronicles of Myanmar Vol. 2, (1913).

==== A siege of Burmese troops in northern cities of Siam ====
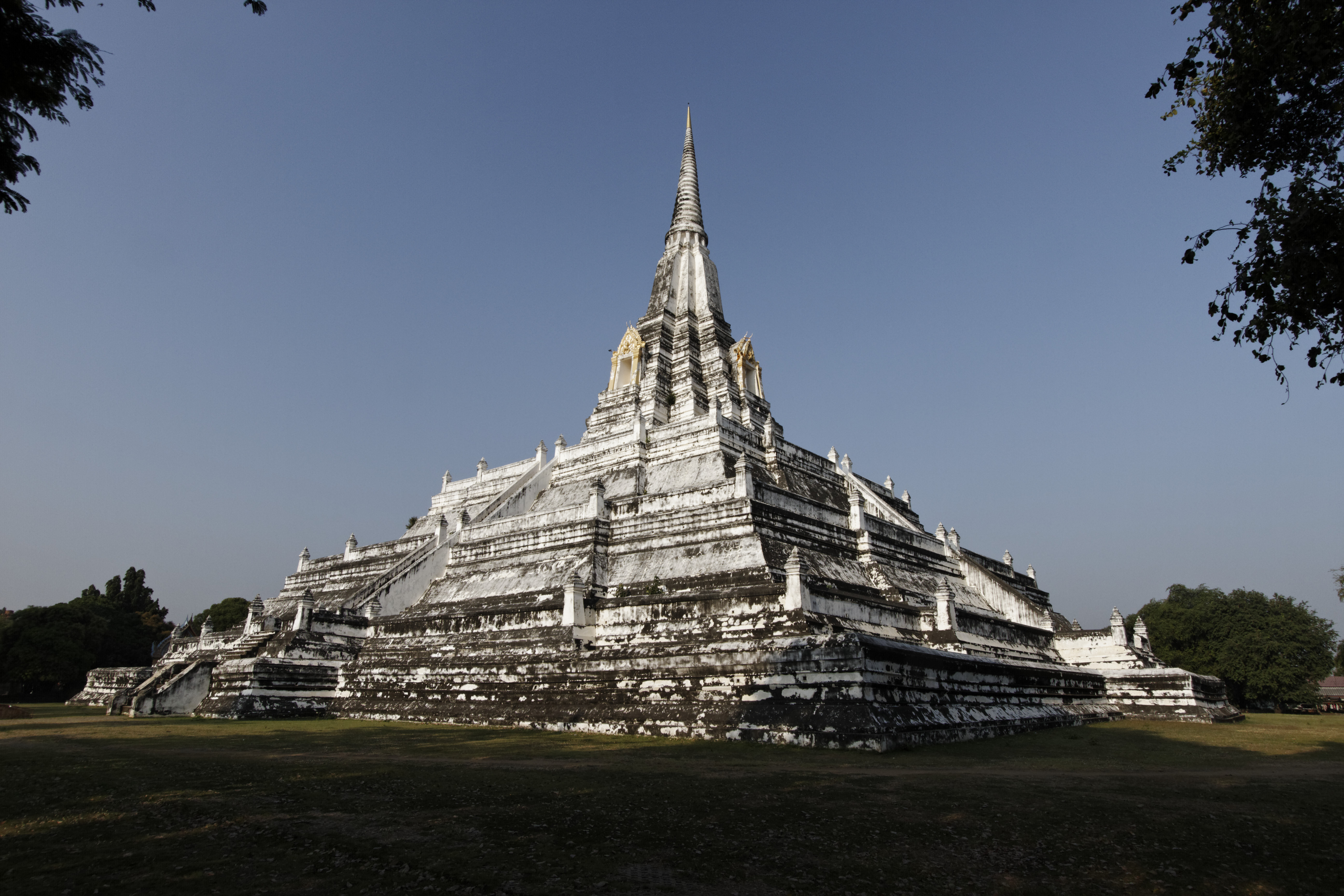
Wat Phu Khao Thong (The Golden Mountain Temple), located in Phra Nakhon Si Ayutthaya province, where Chaophraya Phitsanulok (Rueang) encamped during the Burmese–Siamese War.

The two large arrays of the Burmese expeditionary army marched to Ayutthaya Kingdom in 1765; the northern array of Burmese troops, as the main front, numbered over 20,000 men (in the history of Thailand, up to 10,000 men) during their stay in Lampang city nearby Ayutthaya Kingdom. While the south array of the combined troops, approximately 20,000 men, was commanded by Maha Nawrahta . King Ekkathat then appointed Chaophraya Phitsanulok (Rueang), Governor of Phitsanulok, as commander-in-chief of the northern front to eliminate the Burmese troops from northern cities to the Ayutthaya Kingdom's center. Consequently, the Governor of Phitsanulok marched to Ayutthaya, where he encamped at Wat Phu Khao Thong (Thai: วัดภูเขาทอง), located approximately 3 km northwest of the Ayutthaya Grand Palace, where the Mon pagoda in the temple was built by King Bayinnaung in 1569 as the monument of Burmese victory in the Burmese–Siamese War (1568–1569), also known as the first fall of Ayutthaya Kingdom.

After Ne Myo Thihapate had seized Kamphaeng Phet at the end of the rainy season, the History of Burma stated that Ne Myo Thihapate had successfully seized the Ayutthaya Kingdom's principal northern cities, Sukhothai and Phitsanulok, whose Burmese historical materials were completely contradictory compared to the History of Siam. Many of The Royal Chronicles of Siam stated that Chaophraya Phitsanulok (Rueang) triumphed over Ne Myo Thihapate's troops at Sukhothai, and Phitsanulok became a shelter for Ayutthaya courtiers and the Siamese Royal family of the Ban Phlu Luang Dynasty. This became known as Chaophraya Phitsanulok (Rueang)'s gathering in 1767–1769 (Thai: ชุมนุมเจ้าพระยาพิษณุโลก (เรือง)), the largest gathering in interim Thonburi.

==== A battle between Ne Myo Thihapate and Governor of Phitsanulok ====
During the encampment of Phitsanulok troops at Wat Phu Khao Thong, Chaophraya Phitsanulok (Rueang) requested royal permission to return to Phitsanilok to incinerate his mother's remains by informing King Ekkathat through Phraya Phonladep (Thai: พระยาพลเทพ). The King granted him permission and he left his three subordinates, Luang Mahatthai (Thai: หลวงมหาดไทย), Luang Kosa (Thai: หลวงโกษา (ยัง)) and Luang Thepsena (Thai: หลวงเทพเสนา), in charge of his troops. Prince and historian Damrong Rajanubhab pointed out that it was impossible that the governor of Phitsanulok could be allowed to return to Phitsanilok city during the Burmese-Siamese war.

Later, King Ekkathat appointed Chaophraya Phitsanulok (Rueang) to suppress Burmese troops commanded by Ne Myo Thihapate marching from the northern of the Ayutthaya Kingdom.

The Royal Chronicle of the Kingdom of Ayutthaya said :

"จึ่งกรมการหัวเมืองเหนือบอกข้อราชการศึกลงมาอีกฉบับหนึ่งว่า พม่ายกมาทางเหนืออีกทับหนึ่ง สมุหนายกกราบบังคมทูล จึ่งมีพระราชโองการ ตรัสสั่งให้มีตราขึ้นไปถึงพญาพิศณุโลก ให้ยกทับไปตีทับพม่า."

(Translation): "A chief advisor of northern city further informed official news that Burmese troops had been marched from the north, the Supreme Chancellor of Krom Mahatthai informed King Ekkathat, the King immediately stated a royal order to Chaophraya Phitsanulok (Rueang) to deploy Siamese troops and attack Burmese reinforcements."

— The Royal Chronicle of the Kingdom of Ayutthaya : Version by Somdet Phra Phonnarat of Wat Phra Chettuphon.

===== Burmese History side =====
In August 1765, Gen. Ne Myo Thihapate marched the Burmese troop of 40,000 men from Lampang to the south. His march was sporadically interrupted by Siamese troops. Consequently, Ne Myo Thihapate successfully seized all of the major northern cities and camped at Phitsanilok.

The Royal Chronicle of Myanmar, composed in 1913 A.D. by Prince Narathip Praphanphong said :

"ฝ่ายกองทัพพม่าฝ่ายเหนือก็เดินทัพใหญ่จากเมืองนครลำปาง แต่ในกลางเดือนสิงหาคม สีหปตีมีพลทัพกว่า ๔๐,๐๐๐ คน เป็นไทยใหญ่และลาวโดยมาก ดำเนินขบวนทัพมาทางใต้ต้องถ่วงช้านานมาก เพราะต้องรบราหัวเมืองเล็กน้อยขัดขวาง ในที่สุดผู้จะขัดแข็งทั้งปวงก็พ่ายแพ้อำนาจพม่า ต่างยอมอ่อนน้อมเรียบรายหมดตลอดมาทั้งกองทัพใหญ่ก็ได้กองหนุนพลลาวเพิ่มเติมอีกมาก จึงตั้งยกมาชุมนุมทัพอยู่ ณ เมืองพิษณุโลก."

(Translation): "Northern Burmese reinforcements marched the troops off from Lampang. In the middle of August, Ne Myo Thihapate gathered over 40,000 Burmese troops, mostly from Shan and Laos. The marching along the way to south was very delayed due to Siamese troops' obstruction. At last, all Siamese troops of northern cities were surrendered, and Burmese troops reinforced additionally from Laos. Ne Myo Thihapate, then encamped at Phitsanulok."

— Prince Narathip Praphanphong, The Royal Chronicles of Myanmar Vol. 2, (1913).

And Yodayar Naing Mawgun (Burmese: ယိုးဒယားနိုင်မော်ကွန်း) by Letwe Nawrahta (Note: His title bestowed by King Hsinbyushin was Nay-myo Thiri Zeya Kyaw Htin during 1763–1776.), translated by Soe Thuzar Myint, said in Second Part, Stanza 11 that :

"ME 1127 [22 August 1765], a day of victory and auspiciousness according to the omens, they marched from Lampang to Ayutthaya by land and water routes. The nine brigades of the Zimme column included 300 war elephants, 300 horses, and 20,000 troops. On the route during the march, they fought unflinchingly to quell such towns as Tak, Yarhai [Raheng], Kamphaeng Phet, Sawankhalok, Sukhothai, Rathama, and Phitsanulok which resisted the Myanmar army. In these battles, the Siamese were completely routed and dispersed. Casualties on the enemy's side were high."

— Letwe Nawrahta, Yodayar Naing Mawgun.

===== Siamese History side =====
On August 22, 1765, Gen. Ne Myo Thihapate marched 40,000 Burmese troops south from Lampang and successfully seized the northern cities; Pichai (Thai: พิชัย), Sawan Lok (Thai: สวรรคโลก) and Sukhothai (Thai: สุโขทัย). Phraya Sukhothai (Thai: พระยาสุโขทัย), governor of Sukhothai, intercepted Burmese troops, and Ne Myo Thihapate encamped at Sukhothai city. Chaophraya Phitsanulok (Rueang) and the chief advisor of the northern city arranged the reinforcements and marched immediately to Sukhothai.

The Siamese reinforcement expeditionary troops, commanded by the governor of Phitsanulok, engaged Ne Myo Thihapate's Burmese troops in November 1765.

In Yodaya Naing Mawgun by Letwe Nawrahta said :

"Siamese reinforcements sent from Phitsanulok and other towns were routed. The poet portrays the Siamese as a courageous foe, a worthy adversary of the Myanmar whose commanders had to resort to innovative tactics."

— Letwe Nawrahta, Yodayar Naing Mawgun.

And The Royal Chronicle of Myanmar, composed in 1913 by Prince Narathip Praphanphong, said :

"กองทัพใหญ่สีหปตีก็ยกลงมาตามลำน้ำแม่น้ำเจ้าพระยา กองทัพใหญ่สยามยกขึ้นไปต่อตีก็แตกพ่ายเสียรี้พลล้มตายมาก."

(Translation): "The tremendous troops of Ne Myo Thihapate marched down along Chao Phraya River, the tremendous troops of Siam engaged with Burmese troops, resulting in massive dispersal and deaths among Ne Myo Thihapate's troops."

— Prince Narathip Praphanphong, The Royal Chronicle of Myanmar Vol.2, (1913).

==== Chaofa Chit's Rebellion in Phitsanulok ====
During the battle of Burmese and Siamese troops at Sukhothai, another group of Phitsanulok subsidiary troops, which were still encamped at Wat Phu Khao Thong, was commanded by three subordinates of governor of Phitsanulok: Luang Mahatthai, Luang Kosa, and Luang Depsena.

Prince Chit (Thai: เจ้าฟ้าจีด) was imprisoned in Ayutthaya Grand Place. Luang Kosa fled from Phitsanulok's troop to assist him. Prince Chit then bribed the prison officials and fled with Luang Kosa, H.S.H. Chim and his aides to Phisanulok.

The Royal Chronicle of the Kingdom of Ayutthaya said :

"ฝ่ายเจ้าพญาพิศณุโลกก็ยกกองทับไปช่วยรบพม่า ณะ เมืองศุโขไทย ขณะนั้นจ้าวฟ้าจีดเปนบุตรพระองค์จ้าวดำ ซึ่งตองสำเรจ์โทษครั้งจ้าวฟ้าอไภย จ้าวฟ้าปรเมศร พระมานดานั้นจ้าวฟ้าเทพเปนพระราชธิดาสมเดจ์พระพุทธเจ้าหลวงแผ่นดินทรงปลา เปนจ้าวพี่จ้าวฟ้านิ่ม จ้าวฟ้าสังวาร ซึ่งเปนโทษครั้งกรมพระราชวังนั้น แลจ้าวฟ้าจีดต้องโทษอยู่ในพระราชวัง หลวงโกษาเมืองพิศณุโลกช่วยคิดอ่านให้หนีออกจากโทษได้ รับไป ณะ ค่ายภูเขาทอง แล้วภากันหนีไปเมืองกับทั้งบ่าวไพร่ในกองของตัว."

(Translation): "Chaophraya Phitsanulok also marched reinforcements to engage Burmese troops at Sukhothai. Prince Chit, son of Prince Dum, was awaiting to get executed same as both Prince Abhai, and Prince Parames, where their mother; Princess Dep, was daughter of King Thai Sa, and sister of Princess Nim, and Princess Sangwan, since King Borommakot was viceroy of Siam. Prince Chit was imprisoned in the Royal Palace, whilst Luang Kosa, soldier of Phitsanulok, was intrigued to help Prince Chit. They gathered at Wat Phu Khao Thong where Phitsanulok's troops were still encamped, then fled to Phitsanulok city with their slaves."

— The Royal Chronicle of the Kingdom of Ayutthaya : Version by Somdet Phra Phonnarat of Wat Phra Chettuphon.

In December 1765, Chaophraya Phitsanulok (Rueang) triumphed over Ne Myo Thihapate's troops. The Burmese troops dispersed back toward Nakhon Sawan. The governor of Phitsanulok encamped in Sukhothai, near the border of Phitsanulok where the combat still went on.

King Ekkathat acknowledged Prince Chit's jailbreak and appointed officials to follow them, but they failed to catch them.

On his arrival to Phitsanulok, where there were only a few noblemen and the governor's wife, Lady Qingchaing (Thai: ท่านผู้หญิงเชียง or จึงเชียง), Prince Chit seized Phitsanulok city and proclaimed himself as governor of Phitsanulok, forfeited and committed arson against Chaophraya Phitsanulok (Rueang)’s house.

Lady Qingchaing and her slaves fled to Sukhuthai by floating upward along the Nan River, so that she could inform her spouse, Chaophraya Phitsanulok (Rueang), that Phitsanulok had been seized. Chaophraya Phitsanulok (Rueang) then deployed troops at the border of Phitsanulok and engaged with the rebel's troops. Prince Chit's troops were dispersed and later captured by Chaophraya Phitsanulok's (Rueang's) troops. All prisoners were unable to be restrained to Ayutthaya Royal Palace for punishment, so the governor of Phitsanulok decided to execute all of them using the King's absolute power. Prince Chit was executed by drowning in the Nan River. His daughter, H.S.H. Chim (Thai: หม่อมเจ้าหญิงฉิม), was acquitted. Ne Myo Thihapate took this opportunity and continued to march reinforcements downward to Ayutthaya without engaging Phitsanulok's army. Ne Myo Thihapate's troops reached Ayutthaya on January 20 January 1766, and besieged Ayutthaya with Maha Nawrahta's army.

=== Escape of Siamese Royal family and courtiers to Phitsanulok ===
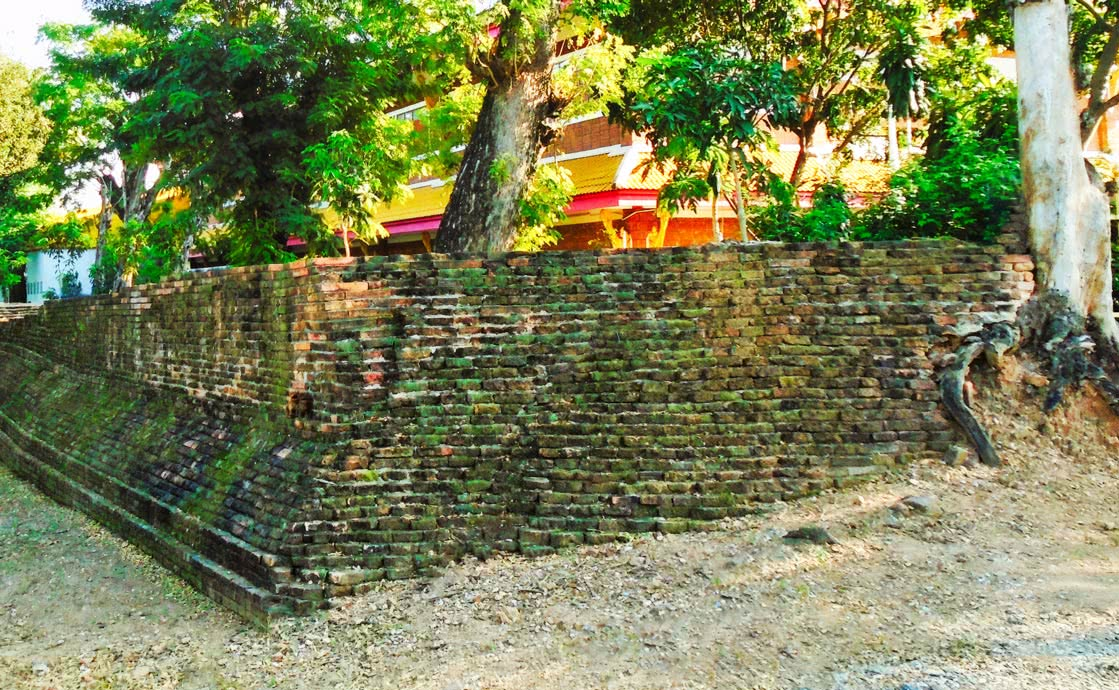
Wreckage of Phitsanulok's old city wall since Ayutthaya Kingdom, was discovered at Wat Phothiyan (Phothiyan Temple), Phitsanulok province, Thailand.

Early in the second fall of Ayutthaya, on April 7, 1767, the outer principal cities in the Ayutthaya Kingdom were dispersing a siege of Burmese troops. Ayutthaya's royal descendants, nobles, and men slipped away from the capital of Ayutthaya and fled to Phitsanulok.

In 1767, Chaofa Chit (Thai: เจ้าฟ้าจีด), also known as H.R.H. Prince Chit, The Prince of Krommakhun Surindarasongkram (Thai: พระเจ้าลูกยาเธอ เจ้าฟ้าจีด กรมขุนสุรินทรสงคราม) and his allies imprisoned at Ayutthaya Royal Palace, escaped by bribing officials with supportive nobleman Luang Kosa (Thai: หลวงโกษา (ยัง)), the Governor of Phitsanulok's adjutant, then fled immediately to Phitsanulok with H.S.H. Chim (Thai: หม่อมเจ้าหญิงฉิม), Chaofa Chit's daughter. Consequently, he was executed by order of the Governor of Phitsanulok.

One of the oldest close friends of Chaophraya Phitsanulok (Rueang) was named Thongdi or Ocphra Akson Sunthonsat (Thai: ออกพระอักษรสุนทรศาสตร์ (ทองดี)), and was the father of King Rama I, and who, being the grand primogenitor of the Chakri dynasty (Thai: สมเด็จพระปฐมบรมมหาชนก (ทองดี)), fled to Phitsanulok with his wife, Bunma (Thai: บุญมา; เจ้าจอมมารดามา), his son, La (Thai: คุณลา; กรมหลวงจักรเจษฎา) and his aides, due to the Governor of Phitsanulok (Rueang) was his intimately familiar friend in his early life since he was in the service of Krom Mahatthai.

Thao Songkandan, the royal maid (Thai: ท้าวทรงกันดาร (ทองคำ)), was conferred as the royal mother during the reign of King Taksin (Thai: เจ้าจอมมารดาทิม ในสมเด็จพระเจ้ากรุงธนบุรี) and was sheltered with her family at Phitsanulok.

According to the testimonials of Chen mo, Wen Shao and Lin Zhengchun, Zhao wang ji (Chinese: 王吉) is Krommamun Thepphiphit or Prince Khag (Thai: กรมหมื่นเทพพิพิธ), son of King Borommakot, the most formidable opponent of King Taksin, also fled to Phitsanulok under protection of Fu shi lu wang [the Governor of Phitsanulok (Rueang)] before he captured Nakhon Ratchasima and proclaimed himself as a leader of Phimai's gathering.

Zhao wang ji sheltered himself under the protection of a local chief of Fu shi lu wang. Zhao wang ji is Kroma Mun Thepphiphit, who is a son of King Borommakot. Nithi points out that Kroma Mun Thepphiphit was the most formidable opponent of King Taksin… ...Zhao wang ji, who is a half elder brother of the King of Siam [King Ekathat] is around fifty years old. He is the son of the Siamese old King and a woman of the Baitou race.

After the second fall of Ayutthaya, there were five powerful aspirants—independent for the position consequently—where the governor of Phitsanulok (Rueang) controlled lower northern Siam, Phitsanulok, and a portion of Nakhon Sawan. Because of these large numbers of courtiers, perhaps they may have encouraged him in his royal proclamation so that he would exalt himself to rule Phitsanulok as King of Siam.

=== Coronation as King of Siam ===
In 1768, in Thonburi interim, an insurrection had been occurring after the second fall of Ayutthaya, and there was no longer a central government. During the mid-year, Chaophraya Phitsanulok (Rueang) royally proclaimed himself as King Ruang (Thai: พระเจ้าพิศณุโลก (เรือง)), King of Siam on his dynastic connection, and also raised Phitsanulok city and a portion of Nakhon Sawan, totaling 7 counties, as the new capital of Ayutthaya Kingdom. The city was renamed Krung Phra Phitsanulok Rajthani Sri Ayudhya Mahanakon (Thai: กรุงพระพิศณุโลกย์ราชธานีศรีอยุทธยามหานคร). He also conferred on his family members and many Ayudhyan courtiers to be in his service including his closest friend; Ocphra Akson Sunthonsat (Thongdi) (Thai: ออกพระอักษรสุนทรศาสตร์ (ทองดี)), the father of King Rama I, with the given noble title Chaophraya Chakri Sri Onkarak (Thongdi) (Thai: เจ้าพระยาจักรีศรีองครักษ์ สมุหนายกเสนาบดี (ทองดี)), with sakdina 10000 and it is likely that, as regent or superintendent of the supreme governor's chief adviser.

In the Letter of King Mongkut to Sir John Bowring said :

"He, on his arrival at 'Phitsanulok,' the great city at Northern Siam, became regent or superintendent of supreme governor of that city, who proclaimed King of Siam after burning of Ayudia was in hand of Burman army, and who died by structing of fever after a few month of the royal proclamation."

— Sir John Bowring. F.R.S, The Kingdom And People Of Siam, Vol. I, (1857).

Three aides of Chaophraya Chakri (Thongdi), Thong Khwan, Yim and Yam, son of Luang Raksena (Jamras) (Thai: หลวงรักษ์เสนา (จำรัส) สกุลศรีเพ็ญ), also received titles. Thong Khwan was Nai Chamnan (Thai: นายชำนาญ), as staff officer, and both Yim and Yam were clerks in military affairs.

The coronation of Chao Phitsanulok was done according to the procedures of the King of Ayutthaya, except a parade procession around the city was postponed.

King Ruang resided at Chan Royal Palace in Phitsanulok until he died in November, 1768. Whilst King Ruang stayed at Phitsanulok, he was involved in skirmishes for at least six months of his reign, particularly with Chao Phra Fang, known as the Priest King who started a war to seize Phitsanulok.

=== Chan Royal Palace restoration ===
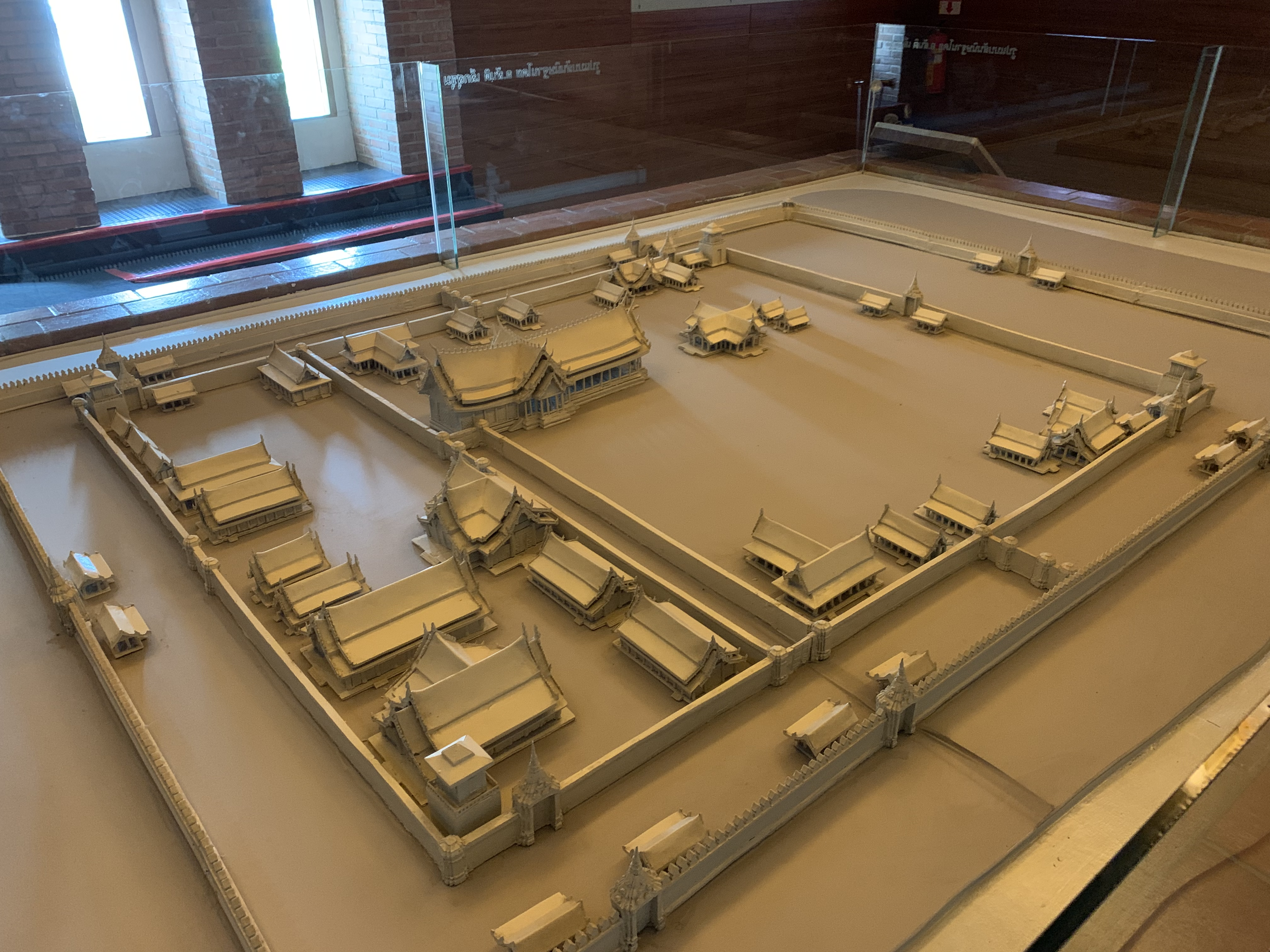
A reconstructed model of Chan Royal Palace, by Santi Leksukhum

In 2006, according to a survey result of Chan Royal Palace (Phitsanulok) by an expedition of Lek-Prapai Viriyahpant Foundation (Bangkok, Thailand) (Thai: มูลนิธิเล็ก-ประไพ วิริยะพันธุ์), some traces were found regarding the restoration and reconstruction of buildings in the palace area. The traces may be associated with Chaophraya Phitsanulok's gathering in 1768. The Foundation stated in the results that :

"เมื่อกรุงศรีอยุธยาเสียแก่ข้าศึกในปี ๒๓๑๐ แล้ว ในสมัยกรุงธนบุรี ปรากฏว่าเจ้าเมืองพิษณุโลกในขณะนั้นได้ตั้งตัวเป็นใหญ่เรียกว่า ชุมนุมเจ้าพิษณุโลก มีร่องรอยหลักฐานบางประการที่พบภายในพระราชวังจันทน์แสดงถึงความพยายามที่จะมีการเข้ามาบูรณะและสร้างกำแพงอาคารขึ้นบนพื้นที่นี้อีกครั้ง ร่องรอยนี้อาจเกี่ยวข้องกับการที่เจ้าเมืองพิษณุโลกพยายามที่จะฟื้นฟูบริเวณพระราชวังเก่าให้เป็นที่อยู่ขึ้นใหม่"

(Translation): In Thonburi period after the post-second fall of Ayutthaya in B.E. 2310 (1767), the governor of Phitsanulok proclaimed himself as King with his gathering called Chao Phitsanulok's gathering (Thai: ชุมนุมเจ้าพิษณุโลก). There are some traces and evidences found at Chan Royal Palace (Phitsanulok) relate to restoration and reconstruction of buildings and walls at this area. These traces indicate an attempt of the governor of Phitsanulok to renovate the Chan Royal Palace for his new residence.

— Expedition of Lek-Prapai Viriyahpant Foundation (Bangkok, Thailand)., Lek-Prapai Viriyahpant Foundation News. (2006).

=== King Ruang's letter to China ===
According to Qing Dynasty Archives, King Ruang of Phitsanulok wrote a royal letter in 1767, sealed with his Chinese name (Note: His other Chinese names were: 魯安國王 [King Ruang], and 彭世洛的倫王 [King Ruang of Phitsanulok].); Fu Shi Lu (Chinese: 扶世祿) or Fu Shi Lu Wang (Chinese: 扶世祿王), meaning of King Phitsanulok, and he sent it to the Chinese government by barque preceding his coronation in 1768. The letter was obtained by Viceroy of Liangguang Li Shiyao (Chinese: 李侍堯) and later presented to Qianlong Emperor, the emperor of the Qing dynasty on 17 July 1768, to report the situation in Siam. The letter was intended to ask the Chinese emperor for his approval of his status as the legitimate King of Siam, as well as to forestall King Taksin from being recognized.

On 29 September 1768. Qianlong Emperor refused to approve King Taksin as legitimate King of Siam because he was not an heir apparent of the Ban Phlu Luang Dynasty. According to Fu Shi Lu's letter, there are still Fu Shi Lu [Phitsanulok], Lukun [Nakohn Si Thammarat], and Gao Lie [Phimai (Prince Thepphiphit), royal descendant of Ban Phlu Luang Dynasty] in Siam who have not surrendered, and also asked Qianlong Emperor for approval of their status as King of Siam from Qianlong Emperor with Chinese imperial seal.

"乃尋國王子孫未得"

(Translation): I searched for the king's descendants but failed to find them.

— King Taksin responded to Qianlong Emperor.

Whilst King Taksin sough approval from the Chinese emperor, he started seeking to purge the remaining princes of the Ban Phlu Luang Dynasty.

Viceroy Li Shiyao secretly investigated some political asylums with the governor of Ha Tian in order to find the princes of Siam that still lived and to report the situation of Ha Tian to the Chinese emperor. Qianlong Emperor discovered two living princes: Prince Chui (Thai: เจ้าจุ้ย) and Prince Sisang (Thai: เจ้าศรีสังข์), descendants of the Siam Dynasty, who had fled to Ha Tien and sheltered themselves there after the burning of Ayutthaya. While Prince Chui sheltered himself at Ha Tien, Qianlong Emperor recognized his status as legitimate King of Siam. Later, Prince Chui gathered troops in Ha Tien to seize King Taksin.

Prince Sisang died at Ha Tien before being captured and Prince Chui was captured and killed by King Taksin in Siam during the interim Siamese–Vietnamese War (1771–1773).

He [Taksin] thus left the chieu khoa Lien to hold Ha Tien and returned to Siam by dap [battleship] with his main force, the captive Mac family and Chieu Chuy [Prince Chui]. The last-named was killed in Siam.

There is no evidence that King Ruang was approved as the legitimate King of Siam despite the fact that he was a descendant of one royal member of the Ban Phlu Luang Dynasty, whilst King Ruang played a role in supporting the remaining royal descendants. However, King Ruang of Phitsanulok's letter proved that he had been enthroned as King of Siam for at least six months.

== Chaophraya Phitsanulok's gathering ==
=== Background ===
After dominating Ayutthaya Kingdom for 417 years, the kingdom was destroyed on April 7, 1767. Siamese prisoners were herded to Burma in large numbers by Ne Myo Thihapate and Maha Nawrahta with the support of a Siamese spy named Phraya Phonlathep (Thai: พระยาพลเทพ). The Testimonies of the inhabitants of Ayutthaya said :

"๏ พระเจ้ากรุงศรีอยุธยาเห็นนายทัพนายกองแตกพ่ายเข้ามาดังนี้ ก็ให้ปิดประตู ให้ทหารขึ้นรักษาหน้าที่เชิงเทินให้มั่นไว้มิได้ออกรบ คราวนั้นพระยาพลเทพ ข้าราชการในกรุงศรีอยุธยาเอาใจออกหาก ลอบส่งศัสตราวุธเสบียงอาหารให้แก่พม่า สัญญาจะเปิดประตูคอยรับ พม่าเห็นได้ทีก็ระดมเข้าตีปล้นกรุงศรีอยุธยา ทำลายเข้ามาทางประตูที่พระยาพลเทพนัดหมายไว้"

(Translation): King of Ayutthaya saw Siamese troops were routed behind the Ayutthaya city wall, the King then decided to close the city wall and array Siamese troops at battlements for observation. At the time, Phraya Phonlathep was on Burmese troops side, not only to secretly provide armaments and food supplies, but he also promised with Burmese troops to open the Ayutthaya city wall if enermies arrived. Consequently, Burmese troops engaged Siamese troops through the Ayutthaya city wall, arranged by Phraya Phonlathep.

— Testimonies of the inhabitants of Ayutthaya and its former king, Khunluang-Hawat.

Phitsanulok was located at the northern end of the kingdom and Ayutthaya officials fled there before a siege of Burmese troops in the Ayutthaya Kingdom's capital.

The Royal Chronicle of Myanmar composed in 1913 by Prince Narathip Praphanphong said :

"ขุนนางพากันหลบเหลื่อมหนีไปเสียแล้วก่อนเสียกรุงโดยมาก"

(Translation): Lot of Ayutthaya courtiers had fled away, before Ayutthaya Kingdom was fall.

— Prince Narathip Praphanphong, The Royal Chronicles of Myanmar Vol. 2, (1913).

Chaophraya Phitsanulok (Rueang)’s gathering (Thai: ชุมนุมเจ้าพระยาพิษณุโลก (เรือง)) was a traditional Ayutthayan gathering of courtiers of Siam Kingdom, joined with the purpose of fighting against Burmese troops controlled by King Rueang of Phitsanulok. The gathering's territory was extended from north to south totaling seven cities under his control including:

List of cities under controlled by King Rueang
Northern city of Ayutthaya Kingdom

1. Phitsanulok (as administration center) (Thai: พิษณุโลก)
2. Sukhothai (Thai: สุโขไทย)
3. Si Satchanalai, Sawan Lok and Chaliang (Thai: ศรีสัชนาลัย, สวรรคโลก and เชลียง)
4. Kamphaeng Phet and Nakhon Chum (Thai: กำแพงเพชร and นครชุม)
5. Phitchit and Pak Yom (Thai: พิจิตร and ปากยม)
6. Phra Bang (Thai: พระบาง)
7. Tung Yang (a.k.a. Phichai) (Thai: ทุ่งยั้ง a.k.a. พิชัย)

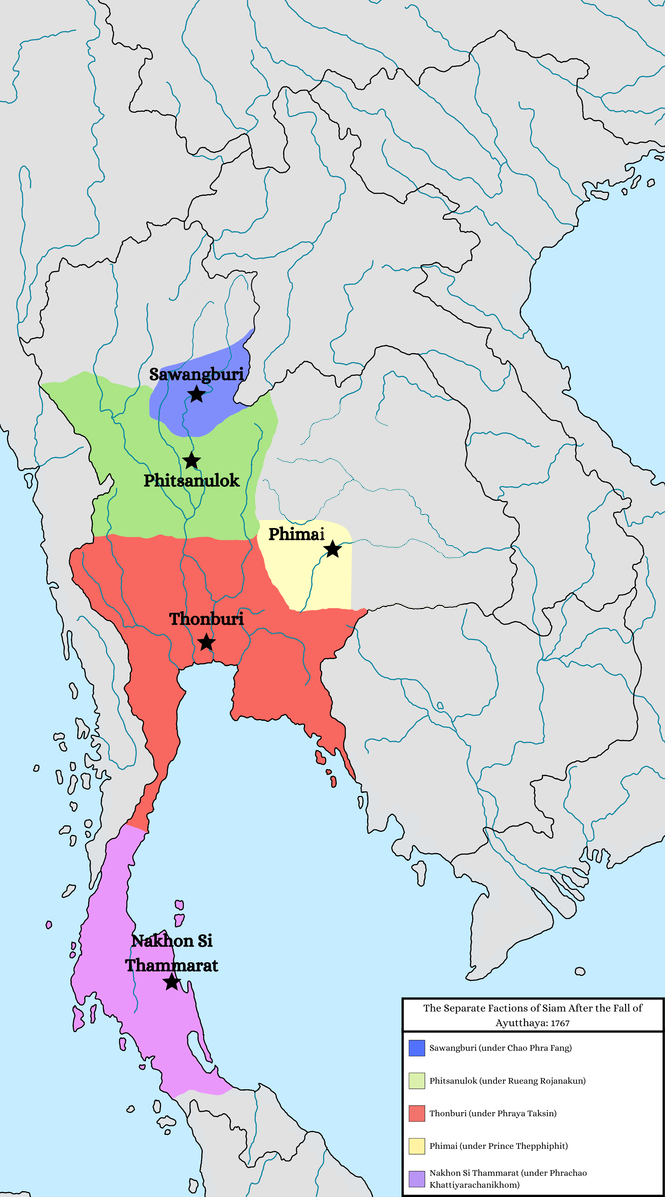
The separate factions of Siam after the second fall of Ayutthaya Kingdom in 1767. I. Sawangburi (Prince Phra Fang) II. Phitsanulok (Rueang Rochanakul) III. Thonburi (Phraya Taksin) IV. Phimai (Prince Thepphiphit) V. Nakohn Si Thammarat (Chaophraya Nakhon (Nu))

Thai historians claimed that Chaophraya Phitsanulok (Rueang)’s gathering was the strongest and biggest gathering in the northern city. This was because the city was fortified by fourteen forts built by French engineers, armaments and Ayutthaya courtiers, and because the governor of Phitsanulok was skilled in battle and trusted as commander-in-chief by King Ekkathat and the Royal descendants of Ban Phlu Luang Dynasty.

The Royal Chronicle of History Regarding Our Wars with the Burmese during Krung Si Ayutthaya composed by Prince Damrong Rajanubhab said :

"ก๊กที่ ๑ คือ เจ้าพระยาพิษณุโลก ตั้งตัวเป็นเจ้าขึ้นที่เมืองพิษณุโลก มีอาณาเขตตั้งแต่เมืองพิชัยลงมาจนเมืองนครสวรรค์ เจ้าพระยาพิษณุโลกคนนี้ชื่อ เรือง เป็นข้าราชการผู้ใหญ่ที่มีความสามารถมาแต่ก่อน ถึงเมื่อพม่าคราวหลังนี้ก็ปรากฏว่ามีฝีมือเข้มแข็งไม่แพ้พม่า คงเป็นเพราะเป็นผู้มีชื่อเสียงเกียรติยศดังกล่าวมานี้ จึงมีผู้นิยมนับถือมาก แม้ข้าราชการเก่าในกรุงศรีอยุทธยาก็ไปเข้ากับเจ้าพิศณุโลกมากด้วยกัน"

(Translation): The first of gathering was Chaophraya Phitsanulok, proclaimed himself as King of Siam at Phitsanulok city, and the gathering was extended from north Phichai downward to Nakhon Sawan. Chaophraya Phitsanulok whose personal named; Rueang, was competent and high–ranking nobleman since the former King of Siam, and the one who triumphed over Burmese Invasion. It was probably because Chaophraya Phitsanulok (Rueang) was such a famous nobleman that Siamese people highly admired him; even lot of Ayutthaya courtiers fled to Phitsanulok to shelter under his protection.

— Prince Damrong Rajanubhab, The Royal Chronicles of History Regarding Our Wars with the Burmese during Krung Si Ayutthaya. (1920).

=== Phitsanulok attacked by Priest King ===
After the gathering was established, Chao Phra Fang, known as Priest King, Sangharaja of Fang, or personal name, Ruan (Thai: เจ้าพระฝาง (เรือน)), became a notorious Buddhist monk, who was renowned for his supernatural powers and ruled Sawangburi or Sawangkhaburi city supported by many other monks.

In 1768, from mid-year onward, Chao Phra Fang initiated his marches to besiege Phitsanulok. King Rueang then deployed his troops and engaged with Chao Phra Fang's troops. The engagement occurred three times, lasting up to six months.

The Royal Chronicle of Letters by the King's Own Hand, composed by Prince Damrong Rajanubhab said :

"จัดแจงกองทัพยกลงมาตีเมืองพระพิศณุโลก ตั้งค่ายล้อมเมืองทั้งสองฟากน้ำ แลเจ้าพิศณุโลกยกพลทหารออกต่อรบเปนสามารถ ทัพฝางจะหักเอาเมืองมิได้ แต่รบกันอยู่ประมาณหกเดือน ทัพฝางก็พากันเลิกกลับไปเมือง"

(Translation): Chao Phra Fang marched his troops downward and encamped at both sides of the Nan River to attack Phitsanulok. Chao Phitsanulok marched the troops into battle against Chao Phra Fang. Finally, Chao Phra Fang couldn't seize Phitsanulok. The major engagements took place over the course of six months and Chao Phra Fang's troops adjourned later.

— Prince Damrong Rajanubhab, The Royal Chronicle of Letters by the King's Own Hand. Vol 2. (1962).

The Sangitiyavansa composed by Somdej Phra Wannaratna of Wat Phrachetupon in 1789, said :

"... พระองค์ได้รบกับภิกษุวรสวางค์ มีกำลังมาก เป็นภิกษุลามกขี้เมาบาปต่าง ๆ ย่ำยีสิกขาบทในพระพุทธสาสนา รบกันด้วยมหาโยธามีกำลังมากมายถึง ๓ ครั้ง ไม่แพ้ชนะกัน"

(Translation): ... he [King Rueang] engaged with powerful Priest King Sawang, the monk who was usually drunk, indecent and violated the codes of Bhuddha discipline (Vinaya). The enormous engagement took place three times, no one won or lost either.

— Somdej Phra Wannaratna of Wat Phrachetupon, The Sangitiyavansa. (1789).

=== Incident of King Taksin to suppress Phitsanulok ===
After King Taksin successfully suppressed Burmese troops at Pho-samton camp, he marched northward by land and river with forces of 15,000 men to Phitsanulok in order to suppress King Rueang's gathering. Once King Rueang was informed of the sign of foes, he deployed Phisanulok troops by land and river downward to Koei Chai (Thai: เกยไชย) at Nakhon Sawan (upper Pho estuary (Thai: ปากน้ำโพ)) and appointed Luang Kosa, personal name Yang (Thai: หลวงโกษา (ยัง)) as commander.

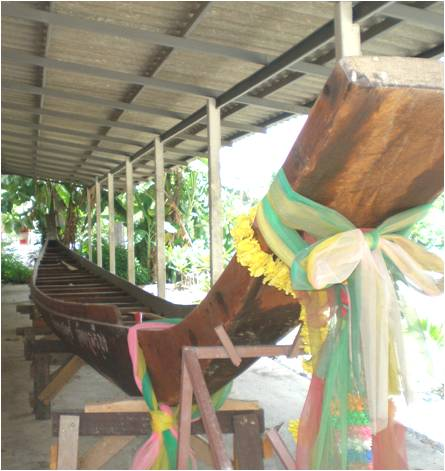
A sample of slender boat in Siam which was utilized by Phitsanulok troops as they cruised the river while attacking King Taksin's march at Koei Chai in 1768.

The battle tactics of Phitsanulok recorded were to utilize Siamese slender boat (Thai: เรือเพรียว) as concealmente, to ensconce behind riverside hills and stealthily attack their foes. Meanwhile, it also flooded, so Phitsanulok troops’ gained an advantage over their foes.

Upon the arrival of King Taksin's troops at Koei Chai, Phitsanulok's troops opened fire on his troops. King Taksin suffered an injury to his left shin and retreated from Koei Chai back to Thonburi. Consequently, King Taksin was lost and failed to suppress King Rueang's gathering.

The Royal Chronicle of Letters by the King's Own Hand, composed by Prince Damrong Rajanubhab said :

"ในปีชวดสัมฤทธิศกนั้น สมเด็จพระพุทธเจ้าอยู่หัวเสด็จยกพยุหโยธาไทยจีนถึงตําบลเกยชัย และเจ้าพระพิษณุโลก (เรือง) ได้ทราบข่าวศึก จึงแต่งให้หลวงโกษา (ยัง) ยกกองทัพลงมาตั้งรับ ได้รบกันเป็นสามารถ ข้าศึกยิงปืนมาต้องพระชงฆ์ข้างซ้าย จึงให้ล่าทัพหลวงกลับมายังกรุงธนบุรี"

(Translation): In 1768, King Taksin marched his troops to Koei Chai with Siamese–Chinese armaments, and Chaophra Phitsanulok (Rueang) was informed of a sign of foe. He appointed Luang Kosa (Yang) to march troops for the upcoming battle. The combat between King Taksin's troops and the foe was fearless; a projectile from the foe hit him on the left shin. King Taksin then retreated from the battlefield to Thonburi.

— Prince Damrong Rajanubhab, The Royal Chronicle of Letters by the King's Own Hand. Vol 2. (1962).

The Royal Chronicle of Thonburi Kingdom Version of Phan Channumat (Choem) said :

"ลุศักราช เสด็จยกพลนิกรดำเนินทัพ สรรพด้วยโยธาหาญใหญ่น้อยขึ้นไปปราบเมืองพิษณุโลกถึงตำบลเกยไชย พระยาพิษณุโลกรู้ประพฤติเหตุ แต่งพลทหารให้หลวงโกษา (ยัง) ยกออกมาตั้งรับ พระเจ้าอยู่หัวเสด็จนำพลทั้งปวงเข้ารณรงค์ด้วยข้าศึกครั้งนั้น ฝ่ายข้าศึกยิงปืนมาดังห่าฝนต้องพระชงฆ์เบื้องซ้าย เลียบตัดผิวพระมังสะไปจึงให้ลาดทัพกลับยังกรุงธนบุรี"

(Translation): In 1768, King Taksin marched troops with heavy armaments and infantry companies to suppress Phitsanilok city. Upon the arrival of the foe, Phraya Phitsanulok acknowledged the strange behaviors of the foe, then arrayed Phitsanulok's troops and appointed Luang Kosa (Yang) to command troop movement in readiness for battle. King Taksin marched troops to attack Phitsanulok. At that moment, Phitsanulok's troop opened fire resoundingly, and a bullet hit the edge of his left shin. King Taksin gets injured and returns to Thonburi.

— The Royal Chronicle of Thonburi Kingdom and daily administrative records of the Thonburi. (1840).

Phraya Srisatchanalaibodi (Liang Siripalaka) said :

"ในปลายปีชวดนั้น สมเด็จพระเจ้าอยู่หัวเสด็จยกพยุหโยธาไทยจีน สรรพด้วยสรรพาวุธทั้งทางบกทางเรือ ขึ้นไปตีเมืองพิษณุโลก ซึ่งเจ้าพระยาพิษณุโลก (เรือง) ตั้งตัวเป็นเจ้าแข็งเมืองอยู่ ได้รบกันเป็นสามารถ ข้าศึกยิงปืนกระสุนปืนเฉียดขาเจ้าหมื่นไวยวรนาถ ซึ่งนั่งเรือหน้าพระที่นั่ง ผ้านุ่งขาด กระสุนเลยไปต้องพระองค์เบื้องซ้าย จึงได้ล่าทัพกลับพระนคร"

(Translation): At the end of the Rat's zodiac year, King Taksin arrayed troops with armaments by land and river to attack Phitsanulok, which was ruled by Chaophraya Phitsanulok (Rueang) who was royally proclaimed as King of Siam. The combat engagement was immensely occurred, while Chaomun Viyavaranat (Thai: เจ้าหมื่นไวยวรนาถ) was sitting in front of King Taksin's battleship, a projectile from Phitsanulok's troops passed close to his legs, and his loincloth was torn. King Taksin got a penetrating injury on his left side caused by the projectile, then returned to Thonburi.

— Phraya Srisatchanalaibodi (Liang Siripalaka), The Important Persons in Thailand. (1963).

Memoirs of Princess Narindaradevi (Thai: พระเจ้าไปยิกาเธอ กรมหลวงนรินทรเทวี) said :

"ไปตีเกยชัย ถูกปืนไม่เข้า"

(Translation): King Taksin unexpectedly encountered battle at Koei Chai and he was shot indirectly.

— Princess Narindaradevi., A memoirs of Princess Narindaradevi. (1767–1837).

And The first primogenitor of Phraya Srisahadep named Thongpeng composed by K.S.R. Kulap said :

"อนึ่งครั้งนั้นที่มีกองทัพ พระจ้าวตากยกมาจากกรุงธนบุรี มีรี้พลล้อมกรุงพระพิศณุโลกย์ ๆ ต่อสู้รบกันโดยสามารถอาจหาญยิ่งหนัก พลทหารกองพระมหาอุปราชย์กรุงพระพิศณุโลกย์ ยิงปืนนกสับคาบศิลายาว ๗ คืบ ออกไปต้องพระฌงค์เบื้องซ้ายแห่งพระจ้าวตาก (สิน) พระจ้าวแผ่นดินกรุงธนบุรีศรีอยุทธยา กำลังทรงพระคชาธารอยู่น่าพลทหารในสมรภูมิ์ยุทธ์ที่พระฌงค์ถูกกระสุนปืนนั้นเป็นแผลฉกรรจ์ จนถึงพระมังษังหวะพระโลหิตไหลเป็นที่ชุ่มชื้นพระบุพโพอยู่เสมอมิได้ขาด กระสุนปืนนั้นถูกเผินไปหน่อยหนึ่งจึ่งหาถูกถนัดตรงพระอัฐิไม่ เปนแต่พระมังษะขาดเป็นช่องไปหน่อยหนึ่งเท่านั้น ขณะนั้นพระจ้าวตากมีพระราโชงการดำหรัศสั่งแก่ นายทัพนายกองให้ล่าทัพกลับไปยังกรุงธนบุรี"

(Translation): Upon a time there were troops. King Taksin deployed troops from Thonburi to Phitsanulok. A fearless combat engagement occurred. The Viceroy of Phitsanulok's Infantries opened fire with 5.5 feet-in length Muskets, a bullet hit King Taksin's left shin, the King of Krung Thonburi Sri Ayutthaya. King Taksin is severely injured—a bleeding wound with exposed muscle—while riding on the king's elephant conveyance in front of troops. Fortunately, the bullet indirectly hit the edge skin of the shin, not the bones. King Taksin then issued a royal order for a retreat in order to return to Thonburi.

— K.S.R. Kulap, The first primogenitor of Phraya Srisahadep named Thongpeng. (1965).

== Death and collapse of the regime ==
In November, 1768. King Rueang was seriously ill and died seven days after falling ill at Chan Royal Palace of an abscess in his neck (another source said he died after 15 days.) after King Taksin's defeat. The actual cause of King Rueang's death can be explained by that 1765 onwards, there was a smallpox pandemic in Ayutthaya Kingdom. Many Siameses and courtiers, carriers of smallpox, escaped to Phitsanulok. The event was recorded in Royal Brahman's Almanac :

"ศักราช ๑๑๒๗ ปีระกา เศษ ๓ ไอ้พม่าล้อมกรุง ชนออกฝีตายมากแล"

(Translation): Thai lesser era 1127 Year of the Rooster, Burmeses surrounded the Ayutthaya city, Siamese escaped and died many of smallpox.

— Phraya Horadhibodi (Thuean), director general of the Royal Brahman Department of Thai Royal House, Royal Brahman's Almanac.

His younger brother, Phraya Chaiyabun (Chan) (Thai: พระยาไชยบูรณ์) or Phra Indara-akon (Thai: พระอินทรอากร) became governor of Phitsanulok. Phitsanulok city was weakened as a result of the new ruler's lack of military capability, in contrast to the former governor.

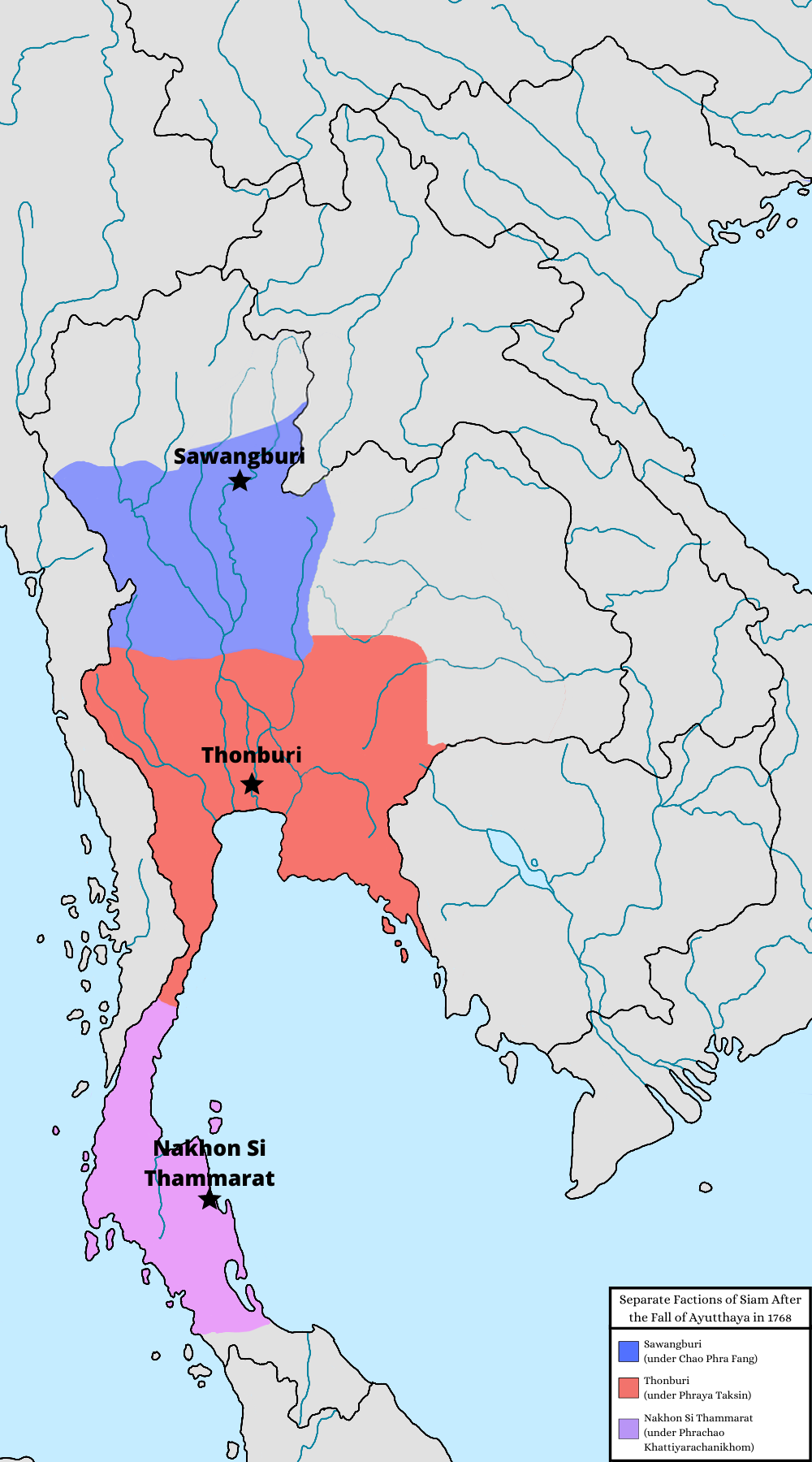
Chao Phra Fang's conquest of Phitsanulok in 1769.

The Sangitiyavansa composed by Somdej Phra Wannaratna of Wat Phrachetupon in 1789, said :

"พระองค์เสวยราชในนครพิษณุโลกนั้นได้ ๖ เดือน มีอายุได้ ๔๙ ก็ทำกาลกิริยาไป"

(Translation): King Rueang was enthroned for six months in Phitsanulok and died at forty–nine years old.

— Somdej Phra Wannaratna of Wat Phrachetupon, The Sangitiyavansa. (1789).

A verse drama of the Ramayana composed by King Taksin said :

"เจ้าพิษณุโลก (เรือง โรจนกุล) ประกาศตนเป็นกษัตริย์ ครองพิษณุโลกมหานคร รบกับคณะเมืองสวางคบุรี ๓ ครั้ง ไม่แพ้ไม่ชะนะกัน ครองราชสมบัติอยู่ ๖ เดือนก็พิราลัยราวเดือน ๑๑ (ก่อนที่สมเด็จพระเจ้าตากสินมหาราช จะทรงนำกองทัพเรือกู้ชาติเข้ามาปราบพะม่ากรุงเก่า ๑ เดือน) ศิริชนมายุ ๔๙ พรรษา"

(Translation): Chao Phitsanulok (Rueang Rochanakul) proclaimed himself King of Siam and ruled the great Phitsanulok city. He engaged with Sawangburi troops three times, but no one won or lost. King Rueang reigned for up to six months before dying in the eleventh month of the year (prior one month in which King Taksin marched his troops to fight Burmese troops in Ayutthaya). He was forty-nine years old in total.

— A verse drama of the Ramayana: composed by King Taksin of Thonburi. (1931).

The Royal Chronicle of Letters by the King's Own Hand, composed by Prince Damrong Rajanubhab said :

"ในปีชวด สัมฤทธิศกนั้น ฝ่ายเจ้าพระพิษณุโลกเรืองเมื่อมีชัยชนะแก่ข้าศึกฝ่ายใต้แล้ว ก็มีน้ำใจกำเริบถือตัวว่ามีบุญญาธิการมาก จึงตั้งตัวขึ้นเป็นพระเจ้าแผ่นดินรับพระราชโองการ อยู่ได้ประมาณเจ็ดวัน ก็บังเกิดวัณโรคขึ้นในคอถึงพิราลัย"

(Translation): After King Rueang of Phitsanulok triumphed over the foes in 1768, he merely exalted and proclaimed himself as King of Siam, but he died within seven days of the Scrofula symptom.

— Prince Damrong Rajanubhab, The Royal Chronicle of Letters by the King's Own Hand. Vol 2. (1962).

After Sawangburi's ruler, Chao Phra Fang (Thai: เจ้าพระฝาง (เรือน)), acknowledged King Reang's death, he quickly deployed his troops to retake Phitsanulok. Phitsanulok was sieged with King Priest troops for three months by Priest King, and the townspeople were starving.

The Royal Chronicle of Siam from the manuscript of British Museum, London. said :

"พระอินอากรตั้งตัวขึ้นเป็นเจ้าพระพิศณุโลกย์ครอบครองเป็นเจ้าของชุมนุมนั้นต่อไปแต่เจ้าพระพิศณุโลกย์ใหม่นั้นสติปัญญาอ่อนแอ เจ้าพระฝางรู้ก็มาตีเมืองพระพิศณุโลกย์"

(Translation): Phra In-akon exalted himself as the new ruler of Phitsanulok's gathering, but the new ruler was weaker. Chao Phra Fang soon deployed troops to suppress Phitsanulok.

— The Royal Chronicle of Siam from the manuscript of British Museum, London.

And The first primogenitor of Phraya Srisahadep named Thongpeng composed by K.S.R. Kulap said :

"ครั้นอยู่มากาลสมัยหนึ่ง จึ่งพระจ้าวกรุงพระพิศณุโลกย์ทรงพระประชวรเปนไข้พิศม์ได้ ๑๕ วันเสด็จดับขันธ์สวรรค์คต พระชนมายุศม์ได้ ๕๒ พรรษาถ้วนควรที่จะสังเวชน์"

(Translation): Upon a time, King of Phitsanulok was ill of smallpox symptom and soon passed away in fifteen days when he was fifty–two years old.

— K.S.R. Kulap, The first primogenitor of Phraya Srisahadep named Thongpeng. (1965).

In December 1768. There was espionage in Phitsanulok to lead Priest King's troops to invade the city. The new governor of Phitsanulok was captured and executed by Chao Phra Fang in February, 1769. The corpse of the new governor; Phraya Chaiyabun (Chan), was exposed over the gate of Phitsanulok city. Numbers of people in Phitsanulok were taken Sawangburi and many of them escaped to Thonburi. Phitsanulok's gathering collapsed then. Luang Kosa (yang) (Thai: หลวงโกษา (ยัง)) was a supporter of Chao Phra Fang side, and lately he gets appointed as commander in Phitsanulok.

== Honors ==
=== Title ===
==== Titles and ranks appointed by King of Siam ====
Chaophraya Phitsanulok's titles during 1732–1767:

- Rueang official and scribe at Krom Mahatthai during the reign of King Thai Sa.
- Luang Maha Ammatayadibodi or Luang Senamataya (Rueang) Northern interior official at Krom Mahatthai in Phitsanulok, sakdina 1,600 during the reign of King Borommakot.
- Phra Rajcharittanonbahonbakdi (Rueang) Inspector as acting permanent secretary official at Phitsanulok, sakdina 3,000 during the reign of King Borommakot.
- Phraya Phitsanulok (Rueang) Governor of Phitsanulok, sakdina 10,000 (First Class) during the reign of King Borommakot.
- Chaophraya Phitsanulok (Rueang) a.k.a. Chaophraya Surasi, Governor of Phitsanulok, sakdina 10,000 (First Class) during the reign of King Borommakot to King Ekkathat.

==== Enthronement ====
- Phrachao Phitsanulok or Chao Phitsanulok (1768) King Rueang of Phitsanulok as state-independent, in Thonburi interim.

=== Namesakes ===
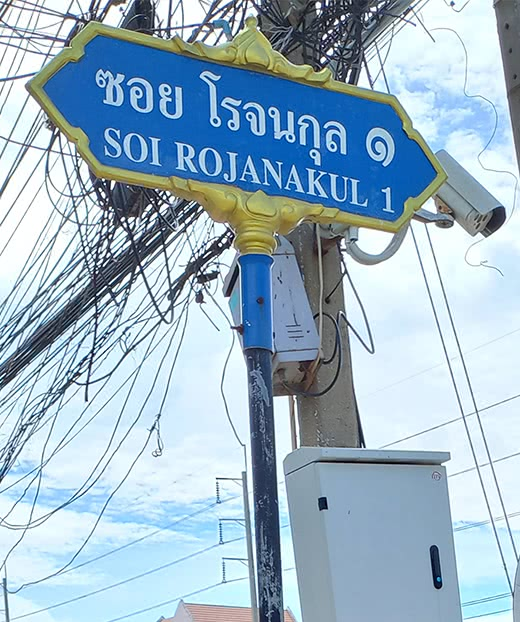
Rochanakul Lane located in Samut Prakan province Thailand.

- Chaophraya Phitsanulok Road (Thai: ถนนเจ้าพระยาพิษณุโลก), Phitsanulok province.
- Phraya Surasi Road (Thai: ถนนพระยาสุรสีห์ or ถนนสุรสีห์), Phitsanulok province.
- Rochanakul Lane (Thai: ซอยโรจนกุล), Samut Prakan province.

=== Primogenitor of noble surname ===
Rochanakul (Thai: โรจนกุล). is Siamese surname no. 368 of the 6,432 Thai Surnames Record conferred by the King, bestowed upon Luang Phisonyutthakan (Puek) and Luang Likhitprecha (Plob). The latter's title was Phraya Chamnan Aksorn (Plob) (Thai: พระยาชำนาญอักษร (ปลอบ)) as Permanent Secretary of The Office of His Majesty's Principal Private Secretary, Bureau of the Royal Household from 1923 to 1927. It was bestowed by King Rama VI on 15 July 1913 and royally countersigned by The Prince Nares Varariddhi (Thai: กรมพระนเรศรวรฤทธิ์), Lord of the Privy Seal (Thai: เสนาบดีกระทรวงมุรธาธร). The Thai surnames record at the King Rama VI Memorial Hall, National Library of Thailand, stated that Chaophraya Phitsanulok (Rueang) was the grand primogenitor of the surname Rochanakul.

== In popular culture ==
Chaophraya Phitsanulok (Rueang)'s presence and occurrences have been mentioned in various contemporary works.

=== Thai literature ===
- The Sangitiyavansa or the Chronicle of Buddhist Councils: The first Pali work belongs to The Chronicle of Pali literature, composed by Somdej Phra Wannaratna of Wat Phrachetupon, also known as Phra Phimonlatham, in 1789, during the early Rattanakosin Kingdom era. The Pali canonical text composition mentioned Chaophraya Phitsanulok (Rueang), who had proclaimed himself as King of Siam.

=== International literature ===
- Yodaya Naing Mawgun by Letwe Nawrahta: A contemporary Myanmar record of the second fall of Ayutthaya Kingdom translated by Soe Thuzar Myint. The record mentioned Phitsanulok troops as a courageous foe, of which Chaophraya Phitsanulok (Rueang) was commander-in-chief. The record said "Siamese reinforcements sent from Phitsanulok and other towns were routed. The poet portrays the Siamese as a courageous foe, a worthy adversary of the Myanmar whose commanders had to resort to innovative tactics."

=== Verse ===
- Sam Krung: A Thai poem composed by Prince Bidyalongkorn in 1942. The story of Chao Phitsanulok (Rueang) in which Prince Bidyalongkorn mentioned, criticized the incidents and attacks on the current leadership in his descriptions.

=== Novel and Fiction ===
- Rattanakosin: The Birth of Bangkok: A Thai historical novel authored by Paul Adirex, mentions an incident of Chaophraya Phisanulok's Force arrangement to intercept the King Taksin's force-five thousand armies to conquer the Chaophraya Phitsanulok (Rueang)’s gathering in Nakhon Sawan, and the death of Chaophraya Phisanulok after his royal proclamation.
- Yot Sawettachat: Thai historical novel, written by Luang Wichitwathakan, mentions an engagement of governor of Phitsanuloks's reinforcement with Burmese troops, and Phitsanulok's seizing by Prince Chit's rebellion.
- Chiwit khong prathet: Thai historical novel, authored by Wissanu Krea-ngam and based upon the second fall of Ayutthaya Kingdom and King Taksin's reunification of Siam. The novel mentions the Royal proclamation of Chaophraya Phitsanulok (Rueang) to exalt himself as King of Siam and how Thongdi, father of King Rama I, got appointed as regent of Phitsanulok.

=== Film and television ===
- Fa Mai: Thai historical drama mentioned Orkya Phra Phitsanulok (Rueang), (Note: The noble title Orkya Phra Phitsanulok was identified as the same title Phraya Phitsanulok.) portrayed by Attachai Anantamek.
- Sai Lohit: Thai historical drama mentioned after governor of Phitsanulok had marched Siamese troops and engaged Burmese at Sukhothai, Prince Chit seized Phitsanulok. The governor of Phitsanulok had to resort to suppress Prince Chit.
- Love Destiny 2 (TV series): either Por Rueng (portrayed by Thanavat Vatthanaputi), Por Rueng's son; Boonrueang (not yet born) or Rueang (portrayed by Parama Imanotai) who lived in Phisanulok during reign of King Thai Sa may be related to the Governor of Phitsanulok in reign of King Borommakot, the successor of King Thai Sa. The name Rueng and Boonrueang may possibly inspired by the biography of Chaophraya Phitsanulok (Rueang).
