= Wang Ao =

Wang Ao is the name of:

- Wang Ao (Viceroy) (1384–1467), Ming dynasty politician
- Wang Ao (Grand Secretary) (1450–1524), Ming dynasty Grand Secretary and essayist
- Wang Ao (Qing dynasty) (fl. 18th century), Qing dynasty official
