= Consort Xun =

Consort Xun may refer to:

- Noble Consort Xun (Qianlong) (1758–1798), concubine of the Qianlong Emperor
- Noble Consort Xun (Tongzhi) (1857–1921), concubine of the Tongzhi Emperor
