= Chen Jin (Viceroy of Liangguang) =

- 陈金
- Born: 1446
- Died: 1528 (aged 81–82)
- Occupations: Ming dynasty official, Viceroy of Liangguang, Right Chief Censor

Chen Jin (Chinese: 陈金, 1446 - 1528), courtesy name Ruli (Chinese: 汝砺) was a politician of the Ming dynasty.

== Life ==
Chen Jin was born in 1446 in Wuchang (modern day Wuhan, Hubei) to a family of officials; his grandfather was Prefect of Kuizhou (in modern-day Chongqing), while his father Chen Lin served as Deputy Commissioner of Guangxi. He entered official service through the imperial examinations in 1472.

In 1507, he was appointed to his first term as Viceroy of Liangguang, where he managed to suppress a local Zhuang rebellion. He then attempted to open trade with the Zhuang as a means of controlling them, but the rebels continued to raid and kill. In 1508, he was promoted to Minister of Revenue in Nanjing, and in 1511 he was appointed to northern Jiangxi to lead a campaign against local bandits. He won military victories and took bandit forts, using locally recruited troops. His own troops pillaged the locals so much that a local poem went:

The bandits merely rob us; but the soldiers then kill us!

In 1515, he was again appointed to be Viceroy of Liangguang and successfully suppressed a pirate rebellion.

Political offices
Preceded by Xiong Xiu	Viceroy of Liangguang; 1507 - 1508	Succeeded by Zhou Nan
Preceded by Zhou Nan	Viceroy of Liangguang; 1515 - 1519	Succeeded by Zhang Nie
