= Pan Fan =

Chinese politician (1438–1516)

- Born: 1438
- Died: 1516
- Occupation(s): Ming dynasty official, Provincial inspector of Sichuan, Viceroy of Liangguang

Pan Fan (Chinese: 潘番) (1438 - 1516) was a politician of the Ming dynasty.

Entering service with the imperial examination in 1466, he was appointed as provincial inspector of Sichuan in 1496, and subsequently as Viceroy of Liangguang in 1501.

In his later years, he offended the eunuch Liu Jin and was subsequently exiled to Suzhou (in present-day Gansu).

Political offices
Preceded by Deng Tingzan	Viceroy of Liangguang; 1501–1506	Succeeded by Xiong Xiu
