= Noble Consort Xun (Qianlong) =

Imperial consort of Qing China (1758–1798)

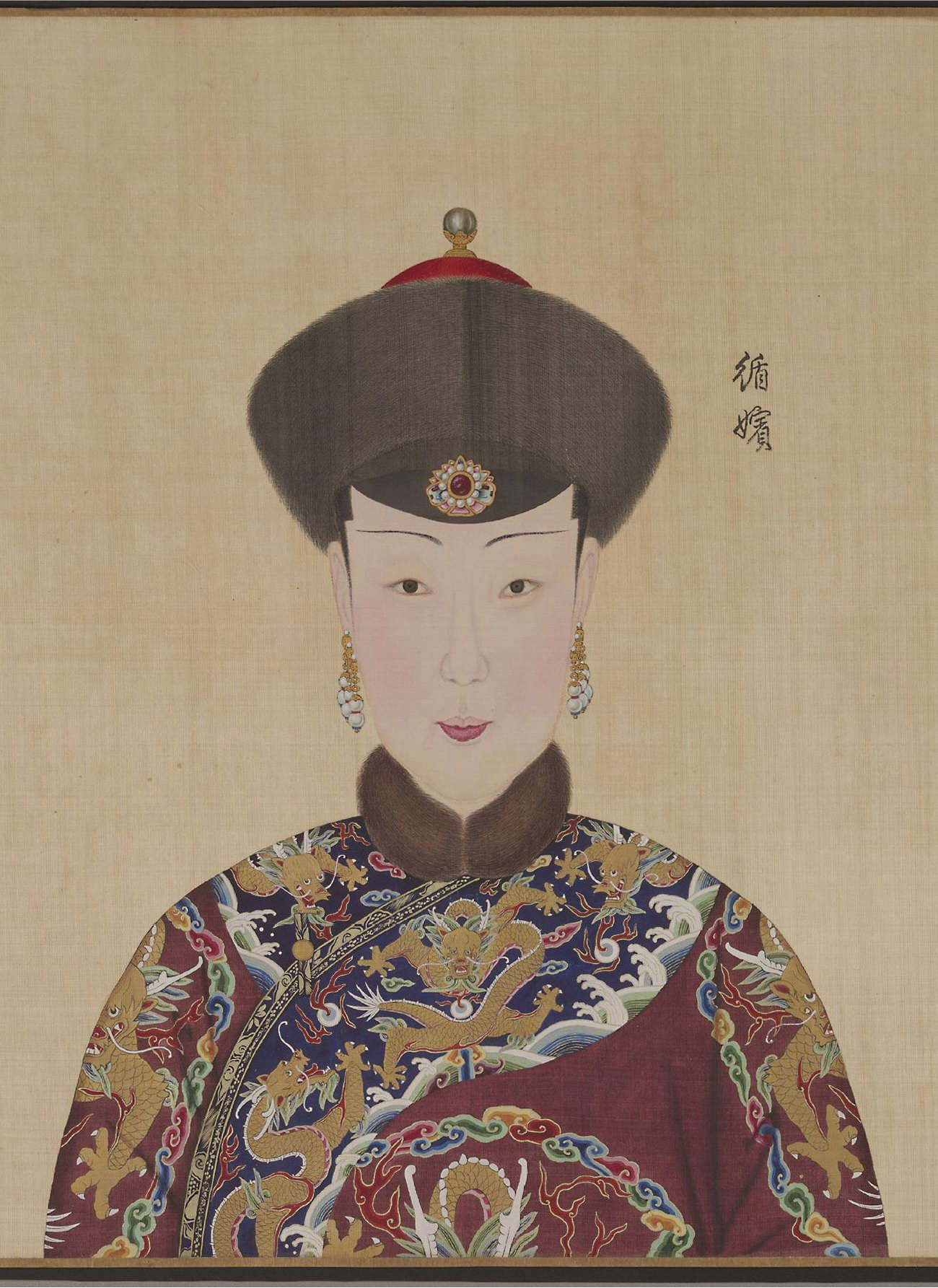
- Qing Dynasty portrait of Noble Consort Xun
- Born: 29 October 1758 (乾隆二十三年 九月 二十八日)
- Died: 10 January 1798 (aged 39) (嘉庆二年 十一月 二十四日); Forbidden City
- Burial: Yu Mausoleum, Eastern Qing tombs
- Spouse: Qianlong Emperor (m. 1776–1797)
Posthumous name
- Noble Consort Xun (循貴妃)
- House: Irgen Gioro (伊爾根覺羅; by birth); Aisin Gioro (by marriage)
- Father: Guilin (Irgen Gioro)

Noble Consort Xun
- Traditional Chinese: 循貴妃
- Simplified Chinese: 循贵妃
Transcriptions
Standard Mandarin
- Hanyu Pinyin: Xún Guìfēi

Noble Consort Xun (29 October 1758 – 10 January 1798), of the Manchu Bordered Blue Banner Irgen Gioro clan, was a consort of the Qianlong Emperor. She was 47 years his junior.

== Life ==
=== Family background ===
Noble Consort Xun's personal name was not recorded in history.

- Father: Guilin (桂林), served as the Viceroy of Liangguang from 1778–1780
  - Paternal grandfather: Henian (鶴年; d. 1758), served as the Viceroy of Liangguang from 1757–1758

=== Qianlong era ===
The future Noble Consort Xun was born on the 28th day of the ninth lunar month in the 23rd year of the reign of the Qianlong Emperor, which translates to 29 October 1758 in the Gregorian calendar.

On 28 December 1776, Lady Irgen Gioro entered the Forbidden City and was granted the title "Concubine Xun" by the Qianlong Emperor. It is not known when she was demoted to "Noble Lady". On 14 November 1779, she was restored as "Concubine Xun". In December 1794 or January 1795, she was elevated to "Consort Xun".

=== Jiaqing era ===
Lady Irgen Gioro died on 10 January 1798 during the reign of the Jiaqing Emperor, the Qianlong Emperor's 15th son. The Jiaqing Emperor posthumously elevated her to "Noble Consort Xun" and arranged for her a funeral befitting that of a Noble Consort.

== Titles ==
- During the reign of the Qianlong Emperor (r. 1735–1796):
  - Lady Irgen Gioro (from 29 October 1758)
  - Concubine Xun (循嬪; from 28 December 1776), fifth rank consort
  - Noble Lady (貴人; from unknown date), sixth rank consort
  - Concubine Xun (循嬪; from 14 November 1779), fifth rank consort
  - Consort Xun (循妃; from December 1794 or January 1795), fourth rank consort
- During the reign of the Jiaqing Emperor (r. 1796–1820):
  - Noble Consort Xun (循貴妃; from 9 October 1799), third rank consort

== See also ==
- Ranks of imperial consorts in China § Qing
- Royal and noble ranks of the Qing dynasty
