= Xiong Xiu =

- 熊繡
- Born: 1441
- Died: 1515
- Occupation(s): Ming dynasty official, Viceroy of Liangguang, Deputy Minister of War

Xiong Xiu (Chinese: 熊繡), courtesy name Ruming (Chinese: 汝明), was a politician of the Ming dynasty.

== Life and career ==
Xiong Xiu was born in 1441 in Daozhou (modern-day Dao county, Hunan). Entering service with the imperial examination in 1466, he was first appointed as inspector of the tea trade in Sichuan, where he was renowned for rejecting gifts from locals.

In the 7th year of the Hongzhi era (1494), Xiong Xiu was appointed an inspector of northern Shaanxi province, where he oversaw the expansion of fortifications in Yulin, Shaanxi. He was also placed in charge of clearing up the registration rolls of military households in the border area, and found that court eunuchs had inflated the number of soldiers, in order to divert their allowances for the eunuchs' own use. Subsequently, nearly 14,000 false names were erased from the rolls.

During the reign of the Zhengde Emperor, Xiong was appointed Viceroy of Liangguang, where he suppressed a rebellion of the Zhuang in He County. He then fell afoul of the eunuch Liu Jin, whom he had offended in the earlier military rolls incident; he was stripped of his official posts and severely fined, which left his household destitute. He died in 1515 without issue.

Political offices
Preceded by Pan Fan	Viceroy of Liangguang; 1506–1507	Succeeded by Chen Jin
