= Chan Royal Palace =

Coordinates: 16°49′47″N 100°15′42″E

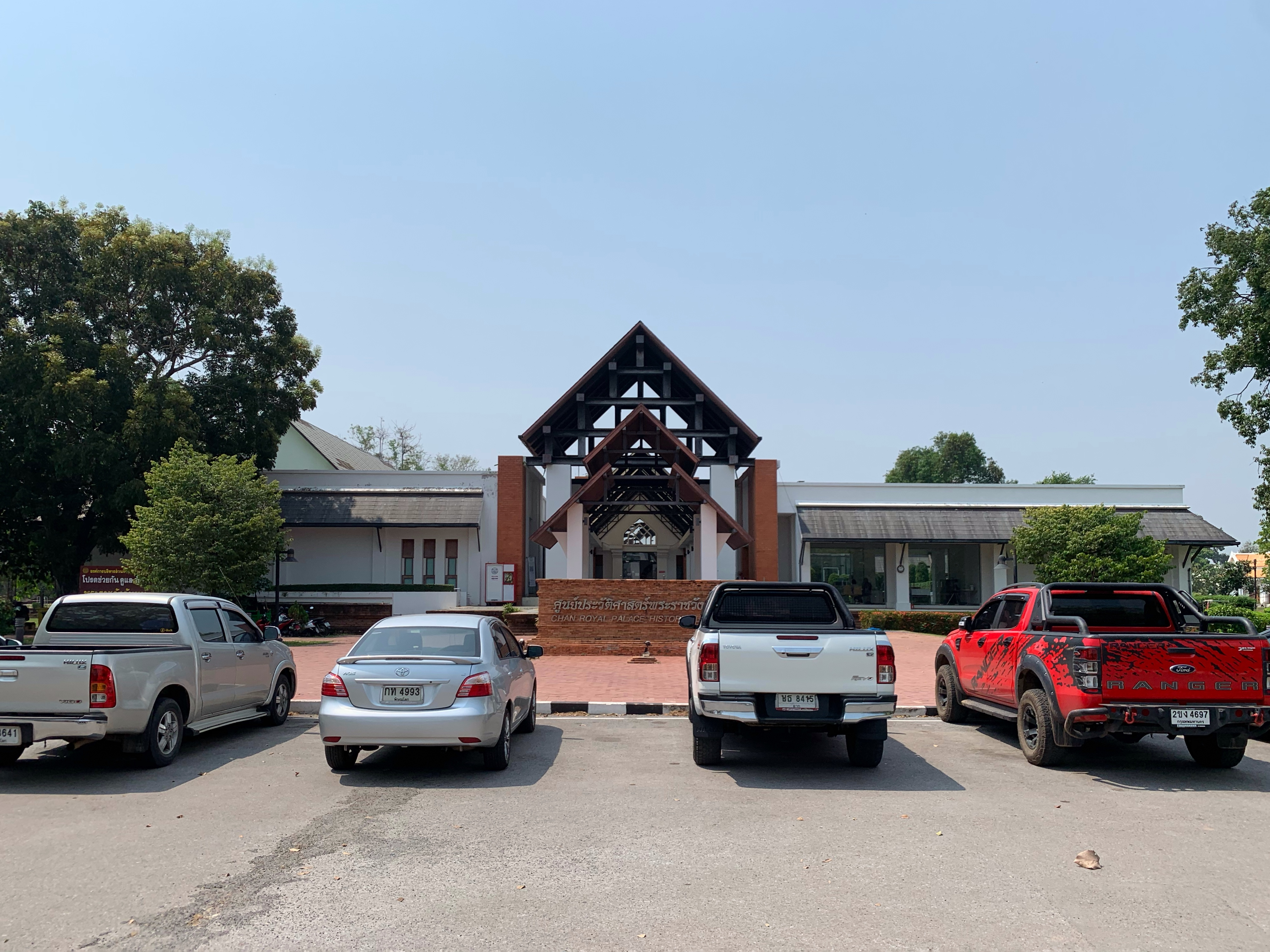
- Entrance to the Chan Royal Palace Historical Center

General information
- Location: Mueang Phitsanulok, Phitsanulok, Thailand

Design and construction
- Known for: Place of birth and original residence of King Naresuan the Great

Chan Royal Palace (Thai: พระราชวังจันทน์; RTGS: phra ratchawang chan) located on the Wang Chan Road, Nai Mueang Sub-district, Mueang Phitsanulok District, Phitsanulok Province of Thailand, is an archaeological site complex consisting of the ruins of the Chan Palace and several temples. It is the location of a King Naresuan the Great shrine. In the past, it was also the location of Phitsanulok Pittayakhom School. Currently, the Fine Arts Department has completed the restoration of the Chan Palace Phase 1.

== History ==
In 1362, King Maha Thammaracha I (Li Thai) of Sukhothai moved his capital to Phitsanulok, where he built the Chan Palace on a mound on the west side of the Nan River. This is presumed to have been the residence of the Thai monarch from the Sukhothai period to the Ayutthaya period.

When King Borommatrailokanat of Ayutthaya moved the capital to Phitsanulok in 1463, his highness used the palace as a royal residence. It is believed that there were additional renovations made to the palace during his reign. From then on, the Chan Palace was frequently used as a residence of the Front Palace of Ayutthaya during this period, most notably becoming the residence of Naresuan when his father, King Maha Thammarcha of Ayutthaya, had given him the palace as a residence to the then-prince. After Naresuan's reign, the palace was abandoned as a royal residence.

== Discovery ==
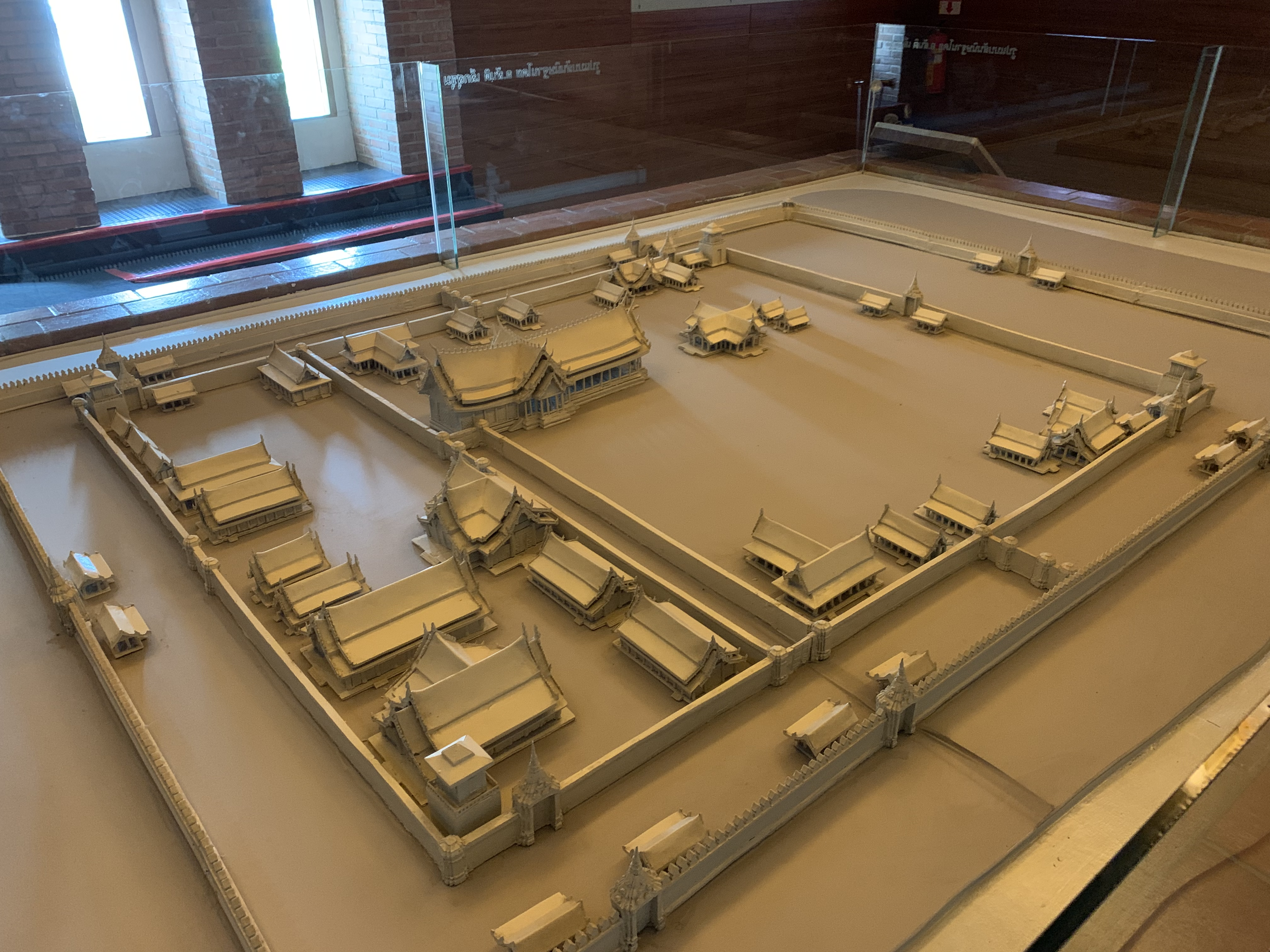
A reconstructed model of the palace ground, based on studies by Santi Leksukhum

The palace was deserted and long forgotten until 1901, when Prince Narisara Nuwattiwong, on a royal visit to Phitsanulok, wrote a letter to King Chulalongkorn. In the letter, he detailed the rediscovery of the palace ruins and recommended the king to send an expedition to Phitsanulok to rediscover and map out the former palace grounds.

King Chulalongkorn received a letter from Prince Nuwattiwong on 17 October, 1901 (2444 B.E.). The letter states:

The remains of a palace made of bricks above the ground, 2-3 cubits, with a palace design similar to the Chantharaphisan Throne Hall at Narai Ratchaniwet (King Narai's Palace) in Lopburi Province. Its ruins long overgrown as a result of the Burmese–Siamese War (1775–1776) (lit. "War of Azaewunky's attack on Phitsanulok").

== Registration as a historic site ==
In 1932, Phitsanulok Pittayakhom School was moved from the area of Wat Nang Phaya to the area of Chan Palace. Therefore, the area of building construction was adjusted respectively.

In 1992, the school constructed a 4-story school building on the basketball court near the Bodhi tree. While construction workers were digging holes for foundations, they discovered the old brick remains of the palace, which then the Fine Arts Department registered as a historic site. On 26 November 1993, with an area of 128 rai, 2 ngan, 50 square wah, according to the letter from the Ministry of Education, 07/4954, ordered the Fine Arts Department to designate the palace as a historical monument. The school had to therefore find a new location. In order to prepare for the third school transfer, they moved to a new location.

== Moving Phitsanulok Phitthayakhom School ==
In 2005, Phitsanulok Pittayakhom School moved from Chan Palace to Kaeng Yai Area until it was completed. They began to demolish all the school buildings in the Chan Palace area and improved the landscape for the restoration of the palace.
