= Qin Hong =

Chinese politician (1426–1505)

- 秦纮
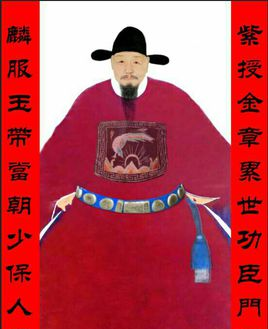

Viceroy of Liangguang
- In office 1489–1495
- Preceded by: Han Yong
- Succeeded by: Deng Tingzan

Viceroy of Shaan-Gan
- In office 1501–1504
- Preceded by: Wang Yue
- Succeeded by: Li Yue

Personal details
- Born: 1426; Shan County, Yanzhou, Shandong Province
- Died: 1505; Shan County, Yanzhou, Shandong Province
- Occupation: Ming Dynasty official, Viceroy of Liangguang, Minister of the Ministry of Revenue

Qin Hong (Chinese: 秦纮) (1426–1505) was a politician of the Ming dynasty.

He achieved the jinshi degree and entered the imperial government in 1451. He served as Governor of Shanxi Province from 1476 to 1479, and Viceroy of Liangguang from 1489 to 1495.

In 1501, Qin was appointed Governor of Military Affairs at the three border prefectures; this post would be a precursor to the Viceroy of Shaan-Gan. He was then appointed head of the Ministry of Revenue in 1504, but declined the appointment due to old age and retired from the civil service.

Political offices
| Preceded by Han Yong | Viceroy of Liangguang; 1489–1495 | Succeeded by Deng Tingzan |
| Preceded by Wang Yue | Viceroy of Chuan-Shaan; 1501–1504 | Succeeded by Li Yue |
