= Henian =

Henian (鶴年, 1711–1758), courtesy name Zhixian (芝仙), was a Qing official of the Irgen Gioro clan and a member of the Manchu Bordered Blue Banner. A Jinshi (進士) graduate of 1736, he served as Governor of Guangdong, Governor of Shandong, and Viceroy of Liangguang.

== Biography ==
Henian's family was originated in Akūli. His tribe joined Nurhaci's Jianzhou Jurchen forces during Henian's ancestor Hucengge (胡成額)'s era. After serving as a Hanlin scholar and Deputy Minister of the Imperial Granaries, Henian was appointed Governor of Guangdong in 1754, where he promoted price stabilization, public security, and anti-smuggling measures. In 1756 he became Governor of Shandong and was responsible for flood relief and hydraulic works. Promoted to Viceroy of Liangguang in 1757, he continued to oversee major flood-control projects in Shandong, including canal dredging and river improvements. His administrative ability won the praise of the Qianlong Emperor. Henian died in office in 1758. He was posthumously awarded the honorary position of Taizi Taibao (太子太保, "Grand Protector of Crown Prince") and Minister of War, received the posthumous name Wenqin (文勤, “Cultured and Diligent”), and was enshrined in the Temple of Worthies.

His son Guilin later also served as Viceroy of Liangguang. His Granddaughter was Noble Consort Xun of Qianlong Emperor.
