= Han Yong (Ming dynasty) =

Chinese politician

Viceroy of Liangguang
- In office 1465–?
- Preceded by: Wang Ao
- Succeeded by: Qin Hong

Personal details
- Born: 1422 Suzhou, Jiangsu Province
- Died: 1478 (aged 55–56)
- Occupation: Ming dynasty official, Viceroy of Liangguang

Han Yong (Chinese: 韩雍) (1422–1478) was a Chinese politician of the Ming dynasty. He was born in what is now Suzhou, Jiangsu Province. He was the 2nd Viceroy of Liangguang, covering the provinces of Guangdong, Guangxi and Hainan.

== Biography ==
Han Yong obtained his jinshi degree in 1422, and served as a censor. In 1452, he was promoted as the provincial inspector for Jiangxi; during his tenure, he restored the Tengwang Pavilion.

In 1465, he was appointed as military inspector for a campaign, led by Zhao Fu, against a rebellion of Miao peoples in Datengxia (present-day Guiping, Guangxi). On the successful conclusion of the campaign, Han Yong was appointed Viceroy of Liangguang to continue pacification efforts, but eventually retired due to attacks from his subordinates.

Political offices
Preceded by Wang Ao	Viceroy of Liangguang; 1465	Succeeded by Qin Hong
