= Zhang Mingqi =

Qing Dynasty politician (1875–1945)

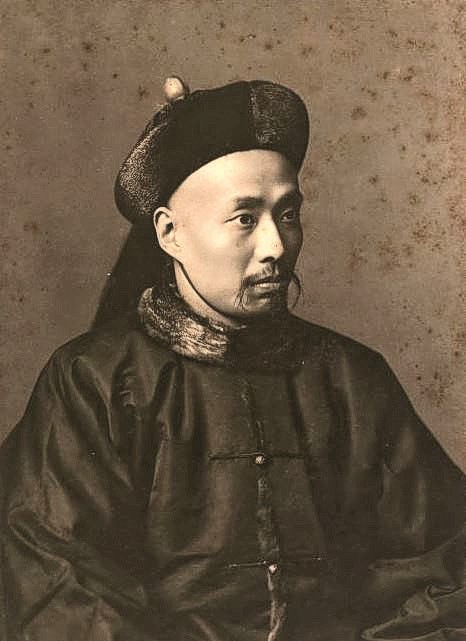

Viceroy of Liangguang
- In office 4 April 1911 – 8 November 1911
- Preceded by: Zengqi (acting)

Personal details
- Born: July 29, 1875 Wudi County, Shandong, Qing dynasty
- Died: September 15, 1945 (aged 70) Tianjin, Republic of China

Zhang Mingqi (traditional Chinese: 張鳴岐; simplified Chinese: 张鸣岐; Wade–Giles: Chang Ming-chi) (July 29, 1875 – September 15, 1945) was a Qing dynasty politician who served as the last Viceroy of Liangguang from April 14 to November 8, 1911. He was born in Shandong. He supported Yuan Shikai's creation of the Empire of China. Afterwards, he fled to the French concession in Shanghai. During the Second Sino-Japanese War, he participated in the collaborationist Wang Jingwei regime. He died in Tianjin one month after the surrender of Japan.
