= Deng Tingzan =

Politician of the Ming dynasty

- 鄧廷瓚
- Died: 1500
- Occupations: Ming dynasty official, Viceroy of Liangguang

Deng Tingzan (Chinese: 鄧廷瓚; died 1500) was a politician of the Ming dynasty.

== Life and career ==
Deng Tingzan was born in Baling County (modern day Yueyang, Hunan).

Entering service with the imperial examination in 1454, he first served as the county magistrate of Chun'an County in Zhejiang, and was then appointed to serve as a prefect in modern-day Guiyang, where he successfully suppressed local Miao rebellions. Between 1495 and 1497, he was appointed as the Viceroy of Liangguang.

Political offices
Preceded by Qin Hong	Viceroy of Liangguang; 1495–1497	Succeeded by Pan Fan
