= Guilin (Irgen Gioro) =

Guilin (桂林, 1735–1780) was a Qing dynasty official of the Irgen Gioro clan and a member of the Bordered Blue Banner. He served as Viceroys of Viceroy of Sichuan and Liangguang.

== Biography ==
The son of the Viceroy Henian, Guilin began his political career from a minor official to become Deputy Minister of Revenue and an assistant in the Grand Council in 1771. During the Second Jinchuan Campaign, he commanded Qing forces in several successful operations against the Jinchuan rebels and helped recover territories. However, following military setbacks and accusations regarding his conduct, he was removed from office and exiled to Ili. Subsequent investigations found many allegations to be unfounded, but he was still held responsible for failures in military leadership. Guilin was later reinstated, serving successively as Imperial Guard, Green Standard Army Commander of Sichuan, and Viceroy of Liangguang. He died in office in 1780. He was posthumously awarded the title of Taizi Taibao (太子太保, "Grand Protector of Crown Prince") and the posthumous name Zhuangmin (壮敏, "Valiant and Diligent").

One of his daughters became Noble Consort Xun of the Qianlong Emperor.
