= Wang Ao (Viceroy) =

Chinese politician (1384–1467)

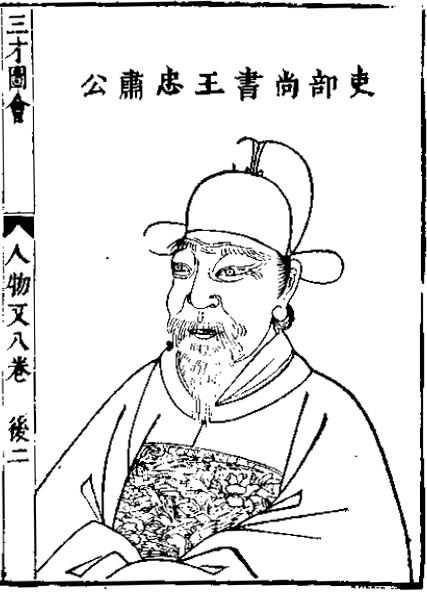
- A Ming dynasty illustration of Wang Ao in the Sancai Tuhui.

Viceroy of Liangguang
- In office 1452–1453
- Succeeded by: Han Yong

Minister of Personnel
- In office 1453–1467
- Preceded by: He Wenyuan
- Succeeded by: Li Ping

Personal details
- Born: 4 March 1384; Hebei, Ming China
- Died: 2 December 1467 (aged 83)

Wang Ao (Chinese: 王翱; 1384–1467) was a Chinese politician of the Ming dynasty. He served as the 1st Viceroy of Liangguang in southern China.

Political offices
Preceded by New creation	Viceroy of Liangguang; 1452–1453	Succeeded by Han Yong
Preceded by He Wenyuan	Minister of Personnel; 1453–1467	Succeeded by Li Ping
