= Wang Ao (Qing dynasty) =

Wang Ao (Chinese: 王鳌), courtesy name Fangxu (芳勖), pseudonym Shouxi (守溪), born in Suzhou, Jiangsu province, was an official who lived in the Qing dynasty.

== Life ==
In 1723, during the reign of the Yongzheng Emperor, he passed the provincial civil service examination under the imperial examination system. Later, he was appointed as the magistrate in Liaoning. He was very fair and impartial during his term of office and earned great admiration from local people.

After Wang had retired as the magistrate, he was invited to teach in the White Deer Grotto Academy. During his teaching time, he launched an article called Deer Grotto Note (鹿洞讲义), which was included in the White Deer Grotto Shu Yuan Zhi (白鹿洞书院志).

== Hobbies ==
Wang was fond of writing calligraphy, composing poems and writing articles. His skills in these areas have won him much acclaim.
