= K.S.R. Kulap =

Siamese historian

- Kulap Tarydsananun ตฤษณานนท์
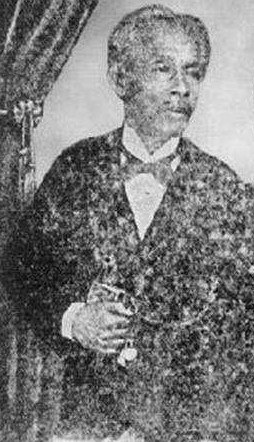
- Born: Kulap Tarydsananun; 1834; Bangkok Siam
- Died: 1921 (aged 86–87); Bangkok Siam
- Occupation: Writer
- Children: 11 children
- Writing career
- Language: Thai

Kulap Tritsananon (Thai: กุหลาบ ตฤษณานนท์; 1834 – 1921), better known by his pen name K.S.R. Kulap, was a 19th-century Siamese writer, historian, and essayist. Born in early 19th-century Siam, his essays regarding the history of Thailand resulted in him producing a significant body of works across his career. Some of his works were censored by the Thai monarchy, and Kulap himself was often noted as being an unreliable historian.

== Biography ==
Kulap was born in 1834. His mother and grandmother traced their lineage back to a minor Thai noble, and as such Kulap was able to enter the civil service at the age of 11. He studied at Wat Phra Chettuphon monastery, and in his early teens studied Buddhism and Chindamani texts. In his late teens, he changed his name to Kesaro (translatable to "Rose" in English), which helped to formulate his pen name, K.S.R. Kulap. After finishing his monastical studies, he was inducted into the Royal Pages Bodyguard Regiment, where he was taught (described by himself as a "smattering") some French, British, and Latin by a French adviser to King Mongkut. Kulap married at the age of 25, and a year later was ordained as a monk.

In the 1860s, Kulap left the monkhood and entered the employment of several British, American, and German firms that were operating in Thailand. As a result of this new career, Kulap saw a drastic increase in his personal wealth, and working with foreign companies allowed him to travel to various European-administered cities in Asia. There, he became fascinated with western methods of printing, which he resolved to implement in Thailand. Kulap accomplished this, and produced a number of books concerning the history of the-then Kingdom of Siam.

During the 1880s, Kulap gradually ingratiated himself with the royal court of Thailand; He was aided in this ingratiation due to the fact that he had studied under one of the same teachers that King Mongkut had. Kulap quickly gained a reputation as a lover of history who was able to translate many older manuscripts from previous eras of Thai history, and this skill set grew his prestige in the royal court. Some of his methods—particularly his tendency to translate texts based on memory—resulted in him being criticized by some of his fellow scholars; in one notable instance, Kulap was accused of altering sources when a source (an account of the traditions of Ayutthayan nobles captured during the Burmese-Ayutthayan wars) was not discovered in the royal archives. Kulap countered that he had accurately relayed the source's information; this source was later found in the 1910s, proving the veracity of Kulap's translation. However, Kulap's eccentric writing style, generalization of facts, and pro-western views were sometimes mocked by his contemporaries. He was found guilty of falsifying texts in 1902, but was pardoned due to the negligence of a government official and due to his age.

In 1897, Kulap founded his own journal, Sayam Praphet, which produced texts and moral pamphlets inspired by historical works from Siam's past. He died in 1921.
