= Viceroy of Liangguang =

Viceroy in Ming and Qing Dynasties

Chinese name
- Traditional Chinese: 兩廣總督
- Simplified Chinese: 两广总督
Transcriptions
Standard Mandarin
- Hanyu Pinyin: Liǎngguǎng Zǒngdū

Governor-General of Two Guang Provinces and Other Local Areas, in Charge of Military Affairs, Food and Wages and Governor Affairs (full title)
- Traditional Chinese: 總督兩廣等處地方提督軍務、糧饟兼巡撫事
- Simplified Chinese: 总督两广等处地方提督军务、粮饷兼巡抚事
Transcriptions
Standard Mandarin
- Hanyu Pinyin: Zǒngdū Liǎngguǎng Děng Chù Dìfāng Tídū Jūnwù Liángxiǎng Jiān Xúnfǔ Shì

Manchu name
- Manchu script: ᡤᡠᠸᠠᠩᡩᡠᠩ ᡤᡠᠸᠠᠩᠰᡳ ᡠᡥᡝᡵᡳ ᡴᠠᡩᠠᠯᠠᡵᠠ ᠠᠮᠪᠠᠨ
- Romanization: guwangdung guwangsi uheri kadalara amban

Jurisdiction of the Viceroy of Liangguang in 1911

The Viceroy of Liangguang, fully in Chinese as the Governor-General of Two Guang Provinces and Other Local Areas, in Charge of Military Affairs, Food and Wages and Governor Affairs, was one of eight regional Viceroys during the Ming and Qing dynasties of China. The Viceroy of Liangguang had jurisdiction of military, civil, and political affairs over then Guangdong Province and then Guangxi Province (approx. nowadays Guangdong, Guangxi, Hainan, Hong Kong, and Macau).

== History ==
=== Ming dynasty ===
The office of the Viceroy of Liangguang originated in 1452 during the Ming dynasty. The Jingtai Emperor accepted Yu Qian's proposal to create the office and appointed Wang Ao (王翱) as the first viceroy.

In 1465, the Chenghua Emperor appointed Han Yong (韓雍) as Left Censor-in-Chief and Viceroy of Liangguang. The office was formalised in 1469, with the administrative headquarters fixed in Wuzhou, Guangxi.

In 1536, during the reign of the Jiajing Emperor, the viceroy Qian Rujing (錢如京) created a separate administrative branch in Zhaoqing, Guangdong. In 1564, the headquarters shifted from Wuzhou to Zhaoqing after Wu Guifang (吳桂芳) sought approval from the Jiajing Emperor.

=== Qing dynasty ===
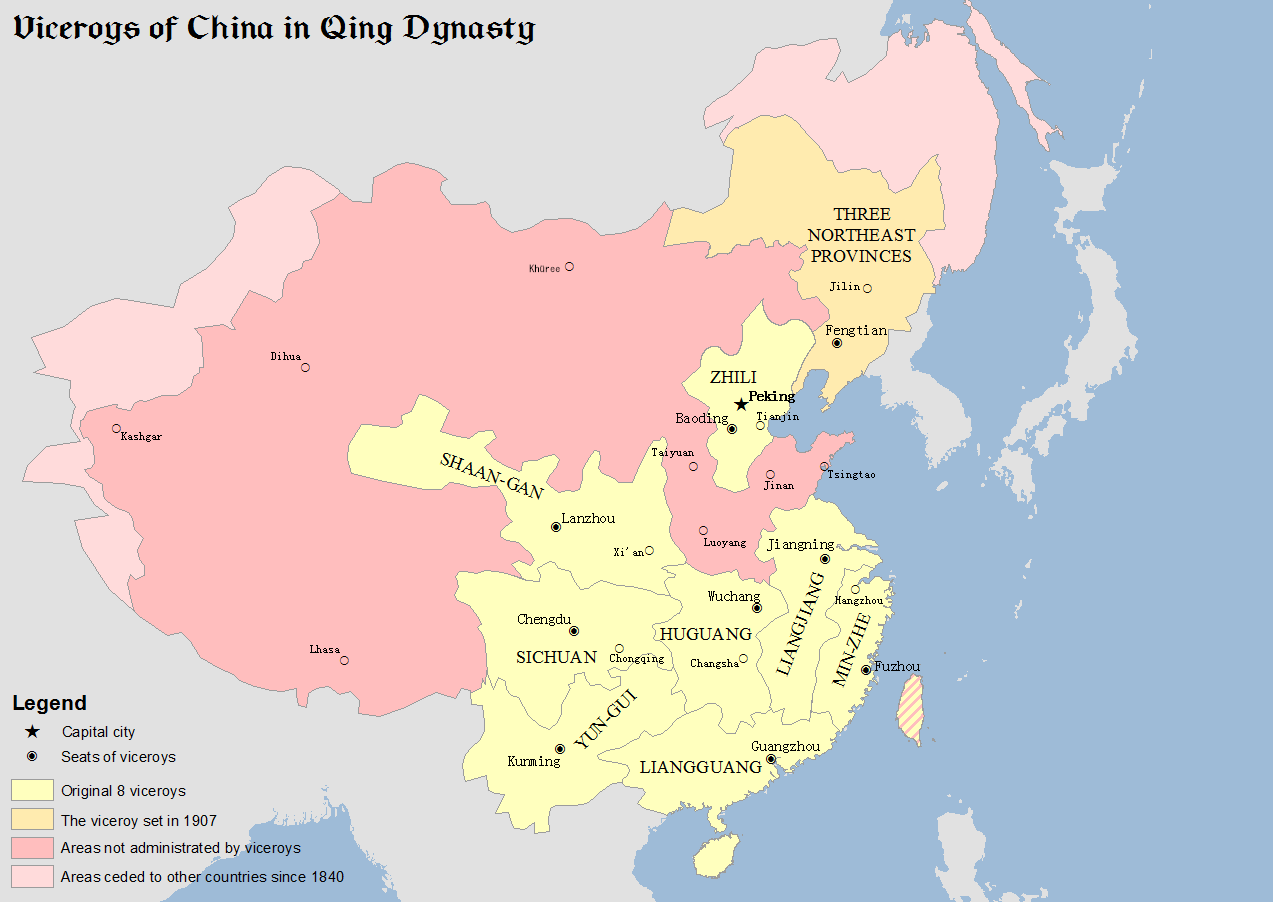
Map of viceroys in Qing Dynasty of China

The office was recreated in 1644 during the reign of the Shunzhi Emperor in the Qing dynasty. It was called "Viceroy of Guangdong" (廣東總督) even though its jurisdiction included Guangxi. The headquarters were in Guangzhou, Guangdong. In 1655, the headquarters shifted back to Wuzhou.

In 1663, during the reign of the Kangxi Emperor, the office was split into two: Viceroy of Guangdong and Viceroy of Guangxi. The headquarters of the Viceroy of Guangdong moved to Lianzhou (廉州; present-day Hepu County, Guangxi). A year later, the Viceroy of Guangxi was merged with the Viceroy of Guangdong, and the headquarters shifted back to Zhaoqing.

In 1723, during the reign of the Yongzheng Emperor, the office was divided into Guangdong and Guangxi again, but were merged again within the following year. In 1729, in response to a rebellion by the Miao people, the Yongzheng Emperor placed Guangxi under the jurisdiction of the Viceroy of Yun-Gui to facilitate the coordination of military operations. In 1734, Guangdong and Guangxi were merged under a single office, Viceroy of Liangguang, and had remained like this until 1905.

In 1746, during the reign of the Qianlong Emperor, the headquarters of the Viceroy of Liangguang shifted to Guangzhou and remained there permanently.

In 1905, during the reign of the Guangxu Emperor, the Viceroy of Liangguang concurrently held the position of Provincial Governor of Guangdong. The position was abolished in 1911 following the collapse of the Qing Dynasty.

== List of Viceroys of Liangguang ==
=== Ming dynasty ===
#	Name	Portrait	Start of term	End of term	Notes
1	Wang Ao 王翱		1452	1453	Promoted to Secretary of Personnel
2	Han Yong 韓雍		1465		Concurrently Left Censor-in-Chief
3	Qin Hong 秦紘		1489	1495	Concurrently Right Censor-in-Chief; later dismissed from office
4	Deng Tingzan 鄧廷瓚		1495	1497	Concurrently a Provincial Governor; later promoted to Left Censor-in-Chief
5	Pan Fan 潘蕃		1501	1506	Concurrently Right Censor-in-Chief; later promoted to Left Censor-in-Chief
6	Xiong Xiu 熊繡		1506	1514	Concurrently Right Deputy Censor-in-Chief; later promoted to Censor-in-Chief in Nanjing
7	Zhou Nan 周南		1514	1515	Retired
8	Chen Jin 陳金		1515	1519	Later promoted to Censor-in-Chief
9	Zhang Ding 張嵿		1522	1525	Concurrently Right Censor-in-Chief; later promoted to Censor-in-Chief in Nanjing and Secretary of Works
10	Yao Mo 姚鏌		1525	1527	Concurrently Right Censor-in-Chief
11	Wang Shouren 王守仁		1527	1529	Concurrently Secretary of Defence in Nanjing and Left Censor-in-Chief
12	Zhang Jing 張經		1537	1544	Promoted to Left Vice Secretary of Defence
13	Tao Xie 陶諧				Concurrently Right Vice Secretary of Defence
14	Bao Xiangxian 鮑象賢				Concurrently Right Vice Secretary of Defence
15	Zhang Yue 張岳		1544	1545	Concurrently Right Deputy Censor-in-Chief
16	Wu Guifang 吳桂芳		1563	1566	Concurrently Right Vice Secretary of Defence
17	Tan Lun 譚綸		1567	1568	
18	Zhang Han 張瀚		1568	1569	Concurrently Left Vice Secretary of Defence and Right Censor-in-Chief
19	Liu Tao 劉燾		1569	1570	Concurrently Left Vice Secretary of Defence and Right Censor-in-Chief
20	Li Qian 李遷		1570	1571	Concurrently Right Vice Secretary of Defence and Censor-in-Chief
21	Yin Zhengmao 殷正茂		1571	1575	Concurrently Secretary of Defence in Nanjing
22	Ling Yunyi 凌雲翼		1575	1578	Concurrently Left Vice Secretary of Defence and Right Censor-in-Chief
23	Liu Yaohui 劉堯誨				Concurrently Right Vice Secretary of Defence and Right Censor-in-Chief
24	Chen Rui 陳瑞		1582	1583	Concurrently Secretary of Defence and Right Censor-in-Chief
25	Guo Yingping 郭應聘		1583	1584	Concurrently Secretary of Defence
26	Wu Wenhua 吳文華		1584	1587	Concurrently Right Vice Secretary of Defence and Right Censor-in-Chief
27	Wu Shan 吳善		1587	1588	Concurrently Right Vice Secretary of Defence
28	Liu Jiwen 劉繼文		1588	1591	Concurrently Right Vice Secretary of Defence
29	Xiao Yan 蕭彥		1591	1592	Concurrently Right Deputy Censor-in-Chief
30	Chen Ju 陳榘		1593	1594	Concurrently Right Vice Secretary of Revenue
31	Chen Dake 陳大科		1595	1598	Concurrently Right Vice Secretary of Defence
32	Dai Yao 戴耀		1598	1609	Concurrently Secretary of Defence and Right Deputy Censor-in-Chief
33	Zhang Minggang 張鳴岡		1610	1614	Concurrently Right Vice Secretary of Defence and Right Censor-in-Chief
34	Zhou Jiamo 周嘉謨		1615	1617	Concurrently Provincial Governor of Yunnan
35	Xu Honggang 許宏鋼		1618	1620	Concurrently Right Vice Secretary of Defence and Right Censor-in-Chief
36	Chen Bangzhan 陳邦瞻		1620	1621	Concurrently Right Vice Secretary of Defence
37	Hu Yingtai 胡應台		1621	1624	Concurrently Right Vice Secretary of Defence and Right Censor-in-Chief
38	He Shijin 何士晉		1624	1625	Concurrently Right Vice Secretary of Defence and Right Censor-in-Chief
39	Shang Zhouzuo 商周祚		1625	1626	Concurrently Right Vice Secretary of Defence and Right Censor-in-Chief
40	Li Fengjie 李逢節		1627	1628	Concurrently Right Vice Secretary of Defence and Right Censor-in-Chief
41	Wang Zunde 王尊德		1628	1631	Concurrently Right Vice Secretary of Defence; died in office
42	Wang Yehao 王業浩		1631	1632	Concurrently Right Vice Secretary of Defence and Right Censor-in-Chief
43	Xiong Wencan 熊文燦		1632	1637	Concurrently Right Vice Secretary of Defence and Right Censor-in-Chief
44	Zhang Jingxin 張鏡心		1637	1641	Concurrently Right Vice Secretary of Defence
45	Shen Youlong 沈猶龍		1641	1644	Concurrently Right Vice Secretary of Defence

==== Southern Ming dynasty ====
#	Name	Portrait	Start of term	End of term	Notes
46	Ding Kuichu 丁魁楚		1644	1644	Concurrently Right Vice Secretary of Defence
47	Wang Huacheng 王化澄		1646	1646	Concurrently Provincial Governor of Guangdong
48	Lin Jiading 林佳鼎		February 1646	1647	
49	Zhu Zhijian 朱治澗		1647	1647	Concurrently Vice Secretary of Defence
50	Li Chengdong 李成棟		1648	April 1649	
51	Li Qipeng 李棲鵬		April 1649	April 1649	
52	Yan Keyi 閻可義		August 1649	August 1649	Died of illness in office
53	Li Jianjie 李建捷		September 1649	September 1649	
54	Luo Chengyao 羅承耀		September 1649	September 1649	
55	Du Yunhe 杜允和		October 1649	1650	Retreated from Guangzhou after the city fell to Qing forces led by Shang Kexi and Geng Jimao
56	Lian Chengbi 連城璧		1650	1659	

=== Qing dynasty ===
#	Name	Portrait	Start of term	End of term	Notes
Viceroy of Guangdong (including Guangxi) (1644–1661)
			1644	15 June 1647	Vacant
1	Tong Yangjia 佟養甲		15 June 1647	1651	
			1651	12 July 1653	Vacant
2	Li Shuaitai 李率泰		12 July 1653	16 March 1656	
3	Wang Guoguang 王國光		16 March 1656	10 July 1658	
4	Li Qifeng 李棲鳳		10 July 1658	2 November 1661	
Viceroy of Guangdong (1661–1665)
5	Li Qifeng 李棲鳳		2 November 1661	2 April 1665	
6	Lu Xingzu 盧興祖		2 April 1665	4 July 1665	
Viceroy of Guangxi (1661–1665)
	Yu Shiyue 于時躍		1661	1663	
	Qu Jinmei 屈盡美		1663	1665	
Viceroy of Liangguang (1665–1723)
7	Lu Xingzu 盧興祖		4 July 1665	30 December 1667	
8	Zhou Youde 周有德		30 January 1668	6 February 1670	
9	Jin Guangzu 金光祖		6 March 1668	1 February 1682	
10	Wu Xingzuo 吳興祚		1 February 1682	8 August 1689	
11	Shi Lin 石琳		19 August 1682	17 December 1702	
12	Guo Shilong 郭世隆		17 December 1702	23 January 1707	
13	Zhao Hongcan 趙弘燦		30 January 1707	19 November 1716	
14	Yang Lin 楊琳		25 November 1716	9 September 1723	
Viceroy of Guangdong (1723–1724)
15	Yang Lin 楊琳		9 September 1723	26 April 1724	
Viceroy of Guangxi (1723–1724)
	Kong Yuxun 孔毓珣		1723	1724	
Viceroy of Liangguang (1724–1728)
16	Kong Yuxun 孔毓珣		26 April 1724	11 November 1728	
Viceroy of Guangdong (Guangxi was under the Viceroy of Yun-Gui) (1728–1734)
17	Kong Yuxun 孔毓珣		11 November 1728	29 March 1729	
18	Hao Yulin 郝玉麟		29 March 1729	21 March 1732	
	Zhang Pu 張溥		14 October 1731	25 February 1732	Acting Viceroy
	Omida 鄂彌達		21 March 1732	17 October 1732	Acting Viceroy
19	Omida 鄂彌達		21 March 1732	5 January 1735	
Viceroy of Liangguang (1734–1905)
20	Omida 鄂彌達		5 January 1735	30 August 1738	
21	Martai 馬爾泰		30 August 1738	10 August 1744	
	Qingfu 慶復		28 May 1741	28 January 1743	Acting Viceroy
	Ts'ereng 策楞		28 January 1743	17 July 1743	Acting Viceroy
22	Nasutu 那蘇圖		10 August 1744	14 May 1745	
23	Ts'ereng 策楞		14 May 1745	28 October 1748	
24	Yengišan 尹繼善		28 October 1748	24 November 1748	
25	Šose 碩色		24 November 1748	9 February 1750	
26	Chen Dashou 陳大受		9 February 1750	14 November 1751	
27	Arigun 阿里袞		14 November 1751	24 February 1753	
	Bandi 班第		16 October 1753	3 May 1754	Acting Viceroy
28	Ts'ereng 策楞		16 October 1753	3 May 1754	
29	Yang Yingju 楊應琚		3 May 1754	31 August 1757	
30	Henian 鶴年		31 August 1757	14 January 1758	
	Li Shiyao 李侍堯				Acting Viceroy
31	Chen Hongmou 陳弘謀		14 January 1758	27 May 1758	
32	Li Shiyao 李侍堯		27 May 1758	27 May 1761	
33	Suchang 蘇昌		27 May 1761	22 July 1764	
34	Li Shiyao 李侍堯		22 July 1764	25 February 1777	
	Yang Tingzhang 楊廷璋		22 July 1765	24 April 1767	Acting Viceroy
35	Yang Jingsu 楊景素		25 February 1777	19 March 1778	
36	Guilin 桂林		19 March 1778	11 January 1780	
37	Bayansan 巴延三		11 January 1780	20 February 1784	
38	Shuchang 舒常		20 February 1784	26 February 1785	
	Sun Shiyi 孫士毅		26 February 1785	1 September 1785	Acting Viceroy
39	Fulehun 富勒渾		1 September 1785	23 May 1786	
40	Sun Shiyi 孫士毅		23 May 1786	19 February 1789	
41	Fuk'anggan 福康安		19 February 1789	14 September 1793	
42	Changlin 長麟		14 September 1793	5 July 1796	
43	Zhu Gui 朱珪		5 July 1796	29 September 1796	
44	Jiqing 吉慶		29 September 1796	17 December 1802	
45	Changlin 長麟		17 December 1802	26 January 1803	
	Hutuli 瑚圖禮				Acting Viceroy
46	Wesibu 倭什布		26 January 1803	30 January 1805	
47	Nayancheng 那彥成		30 January 1805	12 December 1805	
48	Wu Xiongguang 吳熊光		12 December 1805	6 January 1809	
49	Yongbao 永保		6 January 1809	20 February 1809	
50	Bailing 百齡		20 February 1809	16 February 1811	
51	Songyun 松筠		16 February 1811	5 November 1811	
52	Jiang Youxian 蔣攸銛		5 November 1811	22 October 1817	
53	Ruan Yuan 阮元		22 October 1817	22 June 1826	
54	Li Hongbin 李鴻賓		22 June 1826	14 September 1832	
55	Lu Kun 盧坤		14 September 1832	15 October 1835	
56	Deng Tingzhen 鄧廷楨		15 October 1835	21 January 1840	
57	Lin Zexu 林則徐		21 January 1840	3 October 1840	
	Yiliang 怡良		28 September 1840	4 December 1840	Acting Viceroy
58	Qishan 琦善		4 December 1840	26 February 1841	
59	Yishan 奕山		26 February 1841	17 November 1842	
60	Qi Gong 祁𡎴		17 November 1842	19 March 1844	
61	Qiying 耆英		19 March 1844	4 July 1848	
	Xu Guangjin 徐廣縉		3 February 1848	4 July 1848	Acting Viceroy
62	Xu Guangjin 徐廣縉		4 July 1848	7 September 1852	
63	Ye Mingchen 葉名琛		7 September 1852	26 January 1858	
64	Huang Zonghan 黃宗漢		26 January 1858	4 May 1859	
65	Wang Qingyun 王慶雲		4 May 1859	7 October 1859	
	Bogui 柏貴		4 May 1859	21 May 1859	Acting Viceroy
	Lao Chongguang 勞崇光		21 May 1859	7 October 1859	Acting Viceroy
66	Lao Chongguang 勞崇光		7 October 1859	17 October 1862	
67	Liu Changyou 劉長佑		17 October 1862	14 February 1863	
	Yan Duanshu 晏端書		14 February 1863	6 July 1863	Acting Viceroy
68	Mao Hongbin 毛鴻賓		6 July 1863	7 March 1865	
	Wu Tang 吳棠		7 March 1865	13 March 1865	Acting Viceroy
69	Ruilin 瑞麟		13 March 1865	17 October 1874	
	Ruilin 瑞麟		13 March 1865	25 September 1866	Acting Viceroy
70	Yinghan 英翰		17 October 1874	2 September 1875	
	Zhang Zhaodong 張兆棟		17 October 1874	31 March 1875	Acting Viceroy
71	Liu Kunyi 劉坤一		2 September 1875	27 December 1879	
	Yukuan 裕寬		18 December 1878	27 December 1879	Acting Viceroy
72	Zhang Shusheng 張樹聲		27 December 1879	19 April 1882	
	Yukuan 裕寬		27 December 1879	20 May 1880	Acting Viceroy
	Yukuan 裕寬		19 April 1882	6 May 1882	Acting Viceroy
73	Zeng Guoquan 曾國荃		6 May 1882	13 July 1883	
74	Zhang Shusheng 張樹聲		13 July 1883	22 May 1884	
75	Zhang Zhidong 張之洞		22 May 1884	8 August 1889	
76	Li Hanzhang 李瀚章		8 August 1889	13 April 1895	
77	Tan Zhonglin 譚鍾麟		16 April 1895	19 December 1899	The office was renamed to "Viceroy of Liangguang and Provincial Governor of Guangdong" between 30 August and 1 November 1898.
	Deshou 德壽		19 December 1899	24 May 1900	Acting Viceroy
78	Li Hongzhang 李鴻章		24 May 1900	9 July 1900	
	Deshou 德壽		9 July 1900	16 September 1900	Acting Viceroy
79	Lu Chuanlin 鹿傳霖		16 September 1900	26 September 1900	
80	Tao Mo 陶模		26 September 1900	2 July 1902	
	Deshou 德壽		3 July 1902	18 April 1903	
81	Cen Chunxuan 岑春煊		18 April 1903	23 July 1905	
Viceroy of Liangguang and Provincial Governor of Guangdong (1905–1911)
82	Cen Chunxuan 岑春煊		23 July 1905	11 September 1906	
83	Zhou Fu 周馥		11 September 1906	28 May 1907	
84	Cen Chunxuan 岑春煊		28 May 1907	12 August 1907	
85	Zhang Renjun 張人駿		12 August 1907	28 June 1909	
	Yuan Shuxun 袁樹勛		28 June 1909	29 October 1910	Acting Viceroy
	Zengqi 增祺		29 October 1910	14 April 1911	Acting Viceroy
86	Zhang Mingqi 張鳴岐		4 April 1911	8 November 1911	
87	Li Zhun 李準		26 November 1911		Never assumed office
	Lu Rongting 陸榮廷		July 1917	July 1917	During the Manchu Restoration attempt
