= Santi Leksukhum =

Thai art historian and archaeologist

- Born: 1945 (age 80–81); Samut Sakhon Province, Thailand
- Occupations: Art historian; archaeologist
- Known for: Research on Ayutthayan art

Santi Leksukhum (Thai: สันติ เล็กสุขุม; born 1945) is a Thai art historian and archaeologist. He is known for his work on historic Thai art and architecture, especially of the Ayutthaya period.

Santi is from Samut Sakhon Province. He graduated in painting from Silpakorn University, before obtaining a master's degree in archaeology, also from Silpakorn, and completing a PhD in art history and archaeology from the University of Paris. He is a professor emeritus at Silpakorn University's Faculty of Archaeology, where he taught from 1973 until retirement in 1990, and headed the Art History Department as well as the university's Graduate School. He has written about 20 textbooks and over 100 academic articles, and received a National Research Council award in 2000 for his work on the stupas of Wat Ratchaburana. He is a fellow of the Royal Society, and has served advisory roles to the Fine Arts Department and International Council on Monuments and Sites.
