= List of Ming dynasty princes consorts =

In the Ming dynasty times, most titles abolished during the Southern Song were restored. The Ming dynasty developed less complicated system of royal titles. Consort to the princess daughter of the emperor was granted a title of fuma (驸马都尉), meaning "commander of imperial chariot", whereas consort to daughter of imperial prince was styled as yibin (仪宾).

Ranks of princes consorts
Title	Translation	Rank
Fuma Duwei (驸马都尉)	Prince Consort Commander	1
Junzhu yibin (郡主仪宾)	Prince Consort of the first rank	2b
Xianzhu yibin (县主仪宾)	Prince Consort of the second rank	3b
Junjun yibin (郡君仪宾)	Prince Consort of the third rank	4b
Xianjun yibin (县君仪宾)	Prince consort of the fourth rank	5b
Xiangjun yibin (乡君仪宾)	Prince consort of the fifth rank	6b

The following list includes Ming dynasty princes consorts and imperial princesses.

== Daughters of the emperors ==
=== Daughters of Emperor Renzu ===
Year	Prince consort	Princess	Mother	Issue	References
1330s	Wang Qiyi (七一)	Imperial Princess Taiyuan (太原公主)	Empress Chun, lady Chen		
1339	Li Zhen (李贞)	Zhu Fonü, Imperial Princess of Cao (曹国长公主朱佛女)	Empress Chun, lady Chen	Son: Li Wenzhong (李文忠)	

=== Daughters of the Hongwu Emperor ===
Year	Prince consort	Princess	Mother	Issue	References
26 July 1376	Li Qi (李祺)	Zhu Jingjing, Princess of Lin'an (临安公主朱镜静)	Noble Consort Chengmu, lady Sun	Sons: 1.Li Fang (李芳) 2.Li Mao (李茂)	
1377	Mei Yin (梅殷)	Supreme Princess of Ning (宁国大长公主)	Empress Xiaocigao	Sons: 1.Mei Shunchang (梅顺昌) 2.Mei Jingfu (梅景福)	
21 December 1384	Niu Cheng (牛城)	Princess of Chongning (崇宁公主)	NN		
23 December 1381	Ouyang Lun (欧阳伦)	Princess of Anqing (安庆公主)	Empress Xiaocigao		
11 June 1382	Lu Xian (陆贤)	Princess of Runing (汝宁公主)	Consort Ning, lady Guo		
11 September 1382	Wang Ning (王宁)	Zhu Funing, Supreme Princess of Huaiqing (怀庆大长公主朱福宁)	Noble Consort Chengmu, lady Sun	Sons: 1.Wang Zhenliang (王贞亮) 2.Wang Zhenqing (王贞庆)	
2 September 1382	Li Jian (李坚)	Supreme Princess of Daming (大名大长公主)	Consort Ning, lady Guo	Son: Li Zhuang (李庄)	
26 April 1385	Zhang Lin (张麟)	Princess of Fuqing (福清公主)	Consort An, lady Zheng	Son: Zhang Jie (张杰)	
9 April 1386	Fu Zhong (傅忠)	Princess of Shouchun (寿春公主)	NN	Son: Fu Yan (傅彦)	
1387	Hu Guan (胡观)	Zhu Yuhua, Supreme Princess of Nankang (南康大长公主朱玉华)	Lady Lin	Son: Hu Zhong (胡忠)	
23 November 1389	Guo Zhen (郭镇)	Supreme Princess Zhenyi of Yongjia (永嘉贞懿大长公主)	Consort Hui, of the Guo clan	Son: Guo Zhen (郭珍)	
11 September 1394	Yin Qing (尹清)	Supreme Princess of Hanshan (含山大长公主)	Consort, of the Goryeo Han Clan	Sons: 1.Yin Xun (尹勋) 2.Yin Yu (尹玉)	
23 August 1394	Xie Da (谢达)	Supreme Princess of Ruyang (汝阳大长公主)	Consort Hui, of the Guo clan		
1413	Zhao Hui (赵辉)	Supreme Princess of Baoqing (宝庆大长公主)	Lady Zhang		

=== Daughters of the Yongle Emperor ===
Year	Prince Consort	Princess	Mother	Issue	References
1395	Yuan Rong (袁容)	Zhu Yuying, Princess Yong'an (永安公主朱玉英)	Empress Renxiaowen	Son: Yuan Zhen (袁祯) 3 daughters	
1395	Li Rang (李让)	Supreme Princess Yongping (永平大长公主)	Empress Renxiaowen	Son: Li Maofang (李茂芳)	
1402	Song Hu (宋琥)	Supreme Princess Ancheng (安成大长公主)	Empress Renxiaowen	Son: Song Xuan (宋铉)	
1403	Song Ying (宋瑛)	Supreme Princess Xianning (咸宁大长公主)	Empress Renxiaowen	Son: Song Jie (宋杰)	
20 June 1403	Mu Xin (沐昕)	Princess Changning (常宁公主)	NN		

=== Daughters of the Hongxi Emperor ===
Year	Prince Consort	Princess	Mother	Issue	References
1428	Jing Yuan (井源)	Supreme Princess Jiaxing (嘉兴大长公主)	Empress Chengxiaozhao		
1428	Jiao Jing (焦敬)	Zhu Yuantong, Supreme Princess Qingdou (庆都大长公主朱圆通)	Consort Gongyihui, of the Zhao clan		
1429	Li Ming (李铭)	Princess Qinghe (清河公主)	NN		
1429	Wang Yi (王谊)	Princess Zhending (真定大长公主)	Consort Xian, of the Li clan	Son: Wang Ying (王瑛)	

=== Daughters of the Xuande Emperor ===
Year	Prince Consort	Princess	Mother	Issue	References
1437	Shi Jing (石璟)	Imperial Princess Shunde (顺德长公主)	Empress Gong Rang Zhang	Son:	
1440	Xue Huan (薛桓)	Supreme Princess Changde (常德大长公主)	Empress Xiaogongzhang		

=== Daughters of the Emperor Yingzong of Ming ===
Year	Prince consort	Princess	Mother	Issue	References
1461	Zhou Jing (周景)	Princess Chongqing (重庆公主)	Empress Xiaosu	Son: Zhou Xian	
1466	Wang Zeng (王增)	Supreme Princess Jiashan (嘉善公主)	Consort Duanjinghui, lady Wang	Daughters: 1. Wife of Zhang Heling; 2. Wife of count Sun Ming	
1466	Cai Zhen (蔡振)	Supreme Princess Chun'an (淳安大长公主)	Consort Duanzhuangchen, lady Wan	Sons: 1. Cai Yu (蔡遇); 2. Cai Zun (蔡遵); 3. Cai Kui (蔡逵); 4. Cai Qian (蔡迁); Daughters: 1. Lady Cai; 2. Lady Cai	
1466	Yang Wei (杨伟)	Princess Chongde (崇德公主)	Consort Zhuangxi'an, lady Yang	Son: Yang Xi (杨玺)	
1472	Fan Kai (樊凯)	Zhu Yanxiang, Imperial Princess Guangde (广德长公主朱延祥)	Consort Duanzhuangchen, lady Wan	Sons: 1. Fan Qi (樊琦); 2. Fan Yao (樊瑤); 3. Fan Cong (樊琮); 4. Fang Xuan (樊瑄); Daughters: 1. Lady of Qian (黔国夫人); 2. Lady Fan	
1473	Ma Cheng (马诚)	Princess Yixing (宜兴公主)	Consort Gongzhuangde, lady Wei		
1473	You Tai (游泰)	Imperial Princess Longqing (隆庆公主)	Consort Zhuangjingshu, lady Gao	Daughter: You Zhi (游芝)	
1477	Huang Yong (黄镛)	Princess Jiaxiang (嘉祥公主)	Consort Liu		

=== Daughters of the Jingtai Emperor ===
Year	Prince consort	Princess	Mother	Issue	References
1469	Wang Xian (王宪)	Princess Gu'an (固安公主)	Empress Xiaoyuanjing	Wang Dao (王道)	

=== Daughters of the Chenghua Emperor ===
Year	Prince consort	Princess	Mother	Issue	References
1489	Qi Shimei (齐世美)	Supreme Princess Renhe (仁和大长公主)	Consort Zhuangjingshun, lady Wang	5 sons, including Qi Liang (齐良)	
1493	Cui Yuan (崔元)	Supreme Princess Yongkang (永康大长公主)	Consort Duanshunhui, lady Guo	Sons: 1. Cui Fengzheng (崔凤徵); 2. Cui Qizheng (崔麒徵); Daughters: 1. Lady Cui; 2. Lady Cui	
1496	Lin Yue (林岳)	Supreme Princess Deqing (德清大长公主)	Consort Zhaoshunli, lady Zhang	Sons: 1. Lin Lu (林鹿); 2. Lin Zhi (林廌); Daughters: 1. Wife of Gu Huan (顾宦); 2. Lady Lin	

=== Daughters of the Jiajing Emperor ===
Year	Prince consort	Princess	Mother	Issue	References
1555	Li He (李和)	Zhu Luzheng, Supreme Princess Ning'an (宁安大长公主朱禄媜)	Consort Duan, lady Cao	Son: Li Cheng'en (李承恩)	
1557	Xu Congcheng (许从成)	Zhu Suzhen, Princess Jiashan (嘉善公主朱素嫃)	Consort Rongzhaode, lady Zhang		

=== Daughters of the Longqing Emperor ===
Year	Prince consort	Princess	Mother	Issue	References
1581	Hou Gongchen (侯拱辰)	Zhu Yao'e, Imperial Princess Shouyang (寿阳长公主朱尧娥)	Empress Dowager Xiaoding		
1582	Liang Bangrui (梁邦瑞)	Zhu Yaoying, Imperial Princess Yongning (永宁长公主朱尧媖)	Empress Dowager Xiaoding		
1585	Wan Wei (万炜)	Zhu Yaoyuan, Supreme Princess Rui'an (瑞安大长公主朱尧媛)	Empress Dowager Xiaoding	Son: Wan Changzuo (万长祚)	
1587	Wang Bing (王昺)	Zhu Yaoji, Princess Yanqing (延庆公主朱尧姬)	NN		

=== Daughters of the Wanli Emperor ===
Year	Prince consort	Princess	Mother	Issue	References
1597	Yang Chunyuan	Zhu Xuanying, Princess Rongchang (荣昌大长公主朱轩媖)	Empress Xiaoduanxian	Sons: 1. Yang Guangkui (杨光夔); 2. Yang Guanggao (杨光皋); 3. Yang Guangdan (杨光旦); 4. Yang Guangyi (杨光益); 5. Yang Guanglong (杨光龙)	
1609	Ran Xingrang (冉兴让)	Zhu Xuanwei, Princess Shouning(寿宁公主朱轩媁)	Empress Xiaoduanxian	Son: Ran Yinkong (冉印孔)	

=== Daughters of the Taichang Emperor ===
Year	Prince Consort	Princess	Mother	Issue	References
1626	Liu Youfu (刘有福)	Zhu Huiyan, Imperial Princess Ningde (宁德长公主朱徽妍)	Consort Yi, of the Fu clan		
1626	Qi Zanyuan (齐赞元)	Zhu Huijing, Imperial Princess Suiping (遂平长公主朱徽婧)	Consort Yi, of the Fu clan	4 daughters	
	Gong Yonggu (鞏永固)	Zhu Huichuo, Imperial Princess Le'an (乐安长公主朱徽娖/朱徽媞)	Consort Kang, of the Li clan	3 sons, 2 daughters	

=== Daughters of the Chongzhen Emperor ===
Year	Prince consort	Princess	Mother	References
1644	Zhou Xian (周显)	Zhu Meichuo, Princess Changping (长平公主朱媺娖)	Empress Xiaojielie, lady Zhou	

== Daughters of the imperial princes ==
=== Sons of the Emperor Renzu ===
Prince of Jingjiang
Prince consort	Princess	Mother	References
Zhu Xinglong (朱兴隆), Prince of Nanchang (南昌王)
Wang Kegong (王克恭)	Princess Fucheng (福成公主)	Princess Consort of Nanchang, lady Wang	
Zhu Zanyi (朱赞仪), Prince Daoxi of Jingjiang (靖江悼僖王 (Note: Name of the peerage changed to 'Prince of Jinjiang'))
Li Xian (李贤)	Lady of Gongcheng county (恭城县君)	Princess Consort Daoxi of Jingjiang, lady Zhang (张氏)	
Yang Yi (杨义)	Lady of Xuanhua county (宣化县君)	Princess Consort Daoxi of Jingjiang, lady Zhang (张氏)	

=== Sons of the Hongwu Emperor ===
==== Line of Zhu Biao, Crown Prince Yiwen ====
Year	Prince consort	Princess	Mother	Issue	References
1394	Geng Xuan (耿璿)	Princess Jiangdu (江都公主)	NN		
1417	Yu Li (于礼)	Princess of Yilun commandery (宜伦郡主)	NN		

==== Prince of Qin peerage ====
Year	Prince consort	Princess	Mother	References
Zhu Shuang, Prince Min of Qin (秦愍王朱樉)
1410s	Wu Lun (吴伦)	Princess of Pucheng commandery (浦城郡主)	NN	
1410s	Ru Jian (茹鉴)	Princess of Chang'an commandery (长安郡主)	Lady Deng	
Zhu Shangbing, Prince Yin of Qin (秦隐王朱尚炳)
1429	Liu Tai (刘泰)	Princess of Luonan commandery (洛南郡主)	Lady Tang (唐氏)	
1429	He Hao (何灏)	Princess of Hancheng commandery (韩城郡主)	Lady Tang (唐氏)	
1429	Li Chen (李琛)	Princess of Huayin commandery (华阴郡主)	Lady Tang (唐氏)	
Zhu Zhiqie, Prince Kang of Qin (秦康王朱志𡐤)
1440s	Liu Zhen (刘振)	Princess of Yanchuan commandery (延川郡主)	Princess Consort Kang of Qin, lady Chen	
1440s	Li Xun (李恂)	Princess of Dengcheng commandery (澄城郡主)	Princess Consort Kang of Qin, lady Chen	
1440s	Li Yu (李裕)	Princess of Shiquan commandery (石泉郡主)	Princess Consort Kang of Qin, lady Chen	
1440s	Fan Ying (樊瑛)	Princess of Baoji commandery (宝鸡郡主)	Princess Consort Kang of Qin, lady Chen	
Zhu Gonxi, Prince Hui of Qin (秦惠王朱公锡)
1480s	Jiao Qi (焦淇)	Princess of Nan'an commandery (南安郡主)	Princess Consort, Ji Lan (继王妃嵇兰)	
Zhu Gongming, Prince An of Qin (秦安王朱公铭)
1460s	Zhang Chun (张淳)	Princess of Chiyang county (池阳县主)	Princess Consort An of Qin, lady Liu	
1460s	Zhang Chang (张昶)	Princess of Xiayang county (夏阳县主)	Princess Consort An of Qin, lady Liu	
1460s	Di Xian (狄贤)	Princess of Qingshui county (清水县主)	Princess Consort An of Qin, lady Liu	
1460s	Wang Huai (王槐)	Princess of Kaiyuan county (开远县主)	Princess Consort An of Qin, lady Liu	
State general Zhu Bingqiu (奉国将军朱秉楸)
1520s	Liang Bi (梁璧)	Lady of Tongwei county (通渭县君)	Lady Fan (范氏)	
1520s	Zhou E (周鹗)	Lady of Qin'an county (秦安县君)	Lady Fan (范氏)	
1520s	Zhou Jing (周经)	Lady of Wuping county (吴平县君)	Lady Fan (范氏)	
1520s	Luo Chaofeng (罗朝凤)	Lady of Yincheng county (银城县君)	Lady Fan (范氏)	
State general Zhu Weiguang (朱惟光)
1540s-1550s	Hui Keda (惠可大)	Lady of Wenhui village (文惠乡君)	NN	
1540s-1550s	Ma Chengfang (马承芳)	Lady of Qianshan village(汧山乡君)	NN	
1540s-1550s	Fu Guan (傅倌)	Lady of Yongshan village(雍山乡君)	NN	
1540s-1550s	Lu Bu (陆部)	Lady of Yuanhan village (垣翰乡君)	NN	
1540s-1550s	Yuan Shao (袁绍)	Lady of Wanyi village (万亿乡君)	NN	
1540s-1550s	Yang Rulin (杨汝麟)	Lady of Tongchuan village (潼川乡君)	NN	
1540s-1550s	He Laizhen (何来珎), Gao Sixiao (高思孝)	Lady of Yuxi village (裕溪乡君)	NN	
1540s-1550s	Li Yufang(李豫芳)	Lady of Huaide village (怀德乡君)	NN	
1540s-1550s	Yang Zhen(杨榛)	Lady of Chongjie village (崇节乡君)	NN	
1540s-1550s	Tian Yudeng (田愈登)	Lady of Zhenjiang village (浈江乡君)	NN	
Bulwark general Zhu Binglu (朱秉椂)
1530s	Zhang Zhun (张准)	Lady of Huichuan county (会川县君)	NN	
1530s	Ge Song (葛松)	Lady of Shenxian county (莘县县君)	NN	
1530s	Liang Biaozheng (梁表正)	Lady of Jujin county (巨津县君)	NN	
Zhu Binggeng (朱秉梗)
1520s	Mao Yi (毛沂)	Lady of Xingtang county (行唐县君)	Lady Tian	
1520s	Ren Dai (任代)	Lady of Pingshu county (平舒县君)	Lady Tian	
1520s	Zhou Lun (周纶)	Lady of Longyan county (龙岩县君)	Lady Tian	
Zhu Bingbi (朱秉柀)
1524	Bai Jizhi (白继志)	Lady of Pinghu county (平湖县君)	NN	
Zhu Weilian, Prince Duan of Qin (秦端王朱惟燫)
1540s	Wang Yiming (王依明)	Lady of Guangling commandery (广陵郡君)	Secondary consort, Lady Li (次妃李氏)	
Zhu Weiti (朱惟𪹧)
1540s	Yang Lin (杨霖)	Lady of Huangpu village (黄浦乡君)	NN	
1540s	Xue Zhan (薛沾)	Lady of Qinggang village (青岗乡君)	NN	

===== Cadet lines =====
Prince of Yongxing
Year	Prince consort	Princess	Mother	References
Zhu Zhipu, Prince Gongxian of Yongxing (永兴恭宪王朱志墣)
1443	Dou Yong (窦镛)	Princess of Sanyuan county (三原县主)	Princess Consort Gongxian of Yongxing, lady Chen	
Zhu Gongran, defender general (镇国将军朱公冉)
1461	Zhang Yun (张沄)	Lady of Huayuan commandery (华源郡君)	Lady Lu (路氏)	
Zhu Weizhu, defender lieutenant (镇国中尉朱惟煮)
NN	Wang Guocai (王国材)	Lady Zhu, clanswoman (宗女朱氏)	Lady Sun (孙氏)	
Zhu Bingjie, state general (奉国将军朱秉楶)
NN	Di Hong (狄灴)	Lady of Longyan village (龙岩乡君)	NN	
Zhu Weihan, defender lieutenant (镇国中尉朱惟焊)
NN	Wang Yongqi (王永圻)	Lady of Xingtai village (邢台乡君)	NN	
Zhu Jinghe (朱敬鑉)
NN	Guan Yingyuan (管应元)	Lady Zhu, clanswoman (宗女朱氏)	Lady Ma	
Zhu Yizhi (朱谊漐)
NN	Zhou Sheng (周升)	Lady Zhu, clanswoman (宗女朱氏)	NN	
Zhu Yi... (朱谊X)
NN	Li Nong (李秾)	Lady Zhu, clanswoman (宗女朱氏)	NN	
Zhu Zhicen, defender general (镇国将军朱志埁)
	Wu Li (吴理)	Lady of Zhouzhi commandery (盩厔郡君)	NN	
Zhu Gongkai, bukwark general (辅国将军朱公铠)
	Shi Zhang (施漳)	Lady of Yichuan county (义川县君)	Lady Zhang	
	Deng Jie (邓洁)	Lady of Duling county (杜陵县君)	Lady Zhang	

Prince of Bao'an (保安王)
Year	Prince consort	Princess	Mother	References
Zhu Shangyu, Prince Huaixi of Bao'an (保安怀僖王朱尚煜)
1428	Xu Rong (徐荣)	Princess of Lantian county (蓝田县主)	Princess Consort, lady Chen (陈氏)	
1429	Li Xian (李贤)	Princess of Luochuan county (洛川县主)	Princess Consort, lady Chen (陈氏)	
Zhu Zhidong, Prince Daoshun of Bao'an (保安悼顺王朱志垌)
1448	Zheng Jie (郑杰)	Princess of Liquan county (醴泉县主)	Princess Consort, lady He (何氏)	
1448	Lu Bin (鲁斌)	Princess of Tongguan county (同官县主)	Princess Consort, lady He (何氏)	
Zhu Gonglian, Prince Anzhuang of Bao'an (保安安庄王朱公鍊)
1460s	Shen Wen (申文)	Princess of Shangluo county (上洛县主)	Princess Consort, lady Chen (陈氏)	
Zhu Gongdu, defender general (镇国将军朱公镀)
1488	Qiao Tinglu (乔廷录)	Lady of Ducheng commandery (杜城郡君)	Lady Ye (叶氏)	
1488	NN	Lady of Linyou commandery (麟游郡君)	Lady Fan, primary consort (樊氏)	
Zhu Weijie, defender lieutenant (镇国中尉朱惟㸅)
XVI century	Wang Shouli (王守礼)	Lady of Kuishan village (奎山乡君)	Respectful Lady Liu (恭人刘氏)	
XVI century	Zhao Shiqian (赵士谦)	Lady of Luchuan village (陆川乡君)	Respectful Lady Liu (恭人刘氏)	
XVI century	Zhang Ruxian (张汝贤)	Lady (宗女朱氏)	Respectful Lady Liu (恭人刘氏)	
XVI century	Liu Yizhi (刘一豸)	Lady (宗女朱氏)	Lady Ye (叶氏)	
Zhu Jingcheng, state lieutenant (奉国中尉朱敬鏿)
	Wei Sheng (蔚升)	Lady (宗女朱氏)	Calm lady Li (安人李氏）	

Prince of Xingping (兴平王)
Year	Prince consort	Princess	Mother	References
Zhu Shangzhou, Prince Gongjing of Xingping (兴平恭靖王朱尚炿)
1437	Wang Heng (王亨)	Princess of Weiyuan county (渭源县主)	Princess Consort, lady Tang (汤氏)	
Zhu Zhinie, Prince Zhuanghui of Xingping (兴平庄惠王朱志㙞)
1457	Li Mengyin (李孟寅)	Princess of Yishou county (宜寿县主)	Lady Zhang (张氏)	

Prince of Yichuan
Prince consort	Princess	Mother	References
Zhu Zhibao, Prince Zhuangjing of Yichuan (宜川庄靖王朱志堢)
Guo Cong (郭琮)	Princess of Chenggu county (城固县主)	Princess Consort Zhuangjing of Yinchuan, lady Wang	
Zhu Chengning, bulwark general (辅国将军朱诚泞)
Ma Tingyang (马廷扬)	Lady of Guohua county(果化县君)	NN	
Zhu Bingju, supporter general (奉国将军朱秉桔)
Ji Zhi (吉祉)	Lady of Duoxian village (多贤乡君)	Virtuous Lady Lü (淑人吕氏)	
Ge Xiang (葛相)	Lady of Quyang village (曲阳乡君)	Virtuous Lady Lü (淑人吕氏)	
Shao Liangxiang (邵良相)	Lady of Meicheng village (郿城乡君)	Virtuous Lady Lü (淑人吕氏)	
Li Shangyi (李尚义)	Lady of Xuncheng village (鄩城乡君)	Virtuous Lady Lü (淑人吕氏)	
Fan Rong (樊荣)	Lady of Songpu village (松浦乡君)	Virtuous Lady Lü (淑人吕氏)	
Zhu Weijiong (朱惟熍)
Yang Chaochen (杨朝臣)	Lady Zhu, clanswoman (宗女朱氏)	NN	
Zhu Weigeng
Li Jifang (李继芳)	Lady Zhu, clanswoman (宗女朱氏)	Reverent lady Liu (恭人刘氏)	

Prince of Anding (安定王) (Note: Demoted to commoners, peerage abolished.)
Prince consort	Princess	Mother	References
Zhu Gong'ou (朱公鏂)
Shi Tingfu (施廷辅)	Lady Zhu, clanswoman (宗女朱氏)	Lady Shi (石氏)	
Liu Rushi (刘汝时)	Lady Zhu, clanswoman (宗女朱氏)	Lady Shi (石氏)	
Xia Yi (夏义)	Lady Zhu, clanswoman (宗女朱氏)	Lady Shi (石氏)	
Zhu Gongzi (朱公鈭)
Shang Lin (商霖)	Lady Zhu, clanswoman (宗女朱氏)	Lady Zhang (张氏)	
Qu Xiang (璩相)	Lady Zhu, clanswoman (宗女朱氏)	Lady Zhang (张氏)	

Prince of Yongshou (永寿王)
Year	Prince consort	Princess	Mother	References
Zhu Shanghong, Prince Huaijian of Yongshou (永寿怀简王朱尚灴)
1438	Zhou Jian (周鉴)	Princess of Yanchang county (延长县主)	Princess consort, lady Wu (吴氏)	
Zhu Zhizhi, Prince Anhui of Yongshou (永寿安惠王朱志埴)
1459	Liu Jing (刘敬)	Princess of Zhuanglang county (庄浪县主)	NN	
1459	Wang Zeng (王增)	Princess of Lueyang county (略阳县主)	NN	
Zhu Chengyin, bulwark general (辅国将军朱诚湮)
NN	Sun Tenghan (孙腾汉)	Lady of Linfen county (临汾县郡)	Lady Xu (徐氏)	
Zhu Bingji, state general (奉国将军朱秉季)
NN	Xu Zhang (徐𧫱)	Lady of Changning village (昌宁乡君)	Lady Shen (沈氏)	
NN	Zhang Yingchong (张应宠)	Lady of Daliang village (大梁乡君)	Lady Shen (沈氏)	
Zhu Chengying, bulwark general (朱诚濙)
NN	An Shixi (安世熙)	Lady of Xiangling county (襄陵县君)	Lady Shen (沈氏)	
NN	Long Tengxiao (龙腾霄)	Lady of Dayi county (大邑县君)	Lady Shen (沈氏)	
Zhu Bingzhi, state general (奉国将军朱秉櫍)
NN	Sun Xu (孙诩)	Lady of Guihua village (归化乡君)	NN	
NN	Xue Yin (薛银)	Lady of Wujiang village (吴江乡君)	NN	
NN	Han Yanqing (韩燕卿)	Lady of Qiangui village (乾归乡君)	NN	
NN	Wang Chaopin (王朝聘)	Lady of Danya village (丹崖乡君)	NN	
Zhu Bingze, state general (奉国将军朱秉樍)
NN	Zhao Chongyuan (赵仲元)	Lady of Meiwu village (郿邬乡君)	NN	
NN	Tang Wen (唐文)	Lady of Zhujiang village (珠江乡君)	NN	
NN	Wei Shouli (韦守礼)	Lady of Huaxi village (华溪乡君)	NN	
Zhu Gongpu, defender general (镇国将军朱公镤)
NN	Hu Shi (胡氏)	Lady of Pujiang commandery (蒲江郡君)	NN	
Zhu Chengsheng, bulwark general (辅国将军朱诚渻)
NN	Li Fuxing (李复性)	Lady of Jianxiong county (建雄县君)	Lady Sun (孙氏)	
Zhu Chenghan, bulwark general (辅国将军朱诚𣵷)
NN	Kang Youjiu (康悠久)	Lady of Guoxian county (崞县县君)	Lady Tian (田氏)	
NN	Xue Jiang (薛江)	Lady of Ansai county (安塞县君)	Lady Tian (田氏)	
Zhu Bingtai, state general (奉国将军朱秉枱)
NN	Zhang Xuan (张萱)	Lady of Tongdi village (铜鞮乡君)	NN	
NN	Gao Xuan (高选)	Lady of Hongze village (洪泽乡君)	NN	
NN	Zhang Jue (张爵)	Lady of Qiyuan village (漆圆乡君)	NN	
NN	Jiao Yingming (焦应明)	Lady of Liyuan village (丽圆乡君)	NN	
NN	Xu Ying'en (许应恩)	Lady of Qianqing village (钱青乡君)	NN	
NN	He Chenghui (贺承惠)	Lady of Zhonghu village (中湖乡君)	NN	
Zhu Bingde, state general (奉国将军朱秉棏)
NN	Zhao Guangjiu (赵光久)	Lady of Longguan village (陇关乡君)	NN	
NN	Kang Jimin (康济民)	Lady of Nanwu county (南武乡君)	NN	
Zhu Weiwei, defender lieutenant (镇国中尉朱惟尉)
NN	Li Zhi (李枝)	Lady Zhu, clanswoman (宗女朱氏)	Lady Feng (冯氏)	
NN	Sang Bo (桑浡)	Lady Zhu, clanswoman (宗女朱氏)	Lady Feng (冯氏)	
Zhu Huaiji, bulwark lieutenant (辅国中尉朱怀𣙇)
NN	Zhao Yong'an (赵永安)	Lady Zhu, clanswoman (宗女朱氏)	Lady Xiao (萧氏)	
Zhu Jingchong, state lieutenant (奉国中尉朱敬舂)
NN	Qian Guozhang (钱国璋)	Lady Zhu, clanswoman (宗女朱氏)	NN	
Zhu Jingyu, bulwark lieutenant (奉国中尉朱敬𦑕)
NN	Li Bitong (李必通)	Lady Zhu, clanswoman (宗女朱氏)	NN	
Zhu Jingzhai, bulwark lieutenant (奉国中尉朱敬宅)
NN	Li Ruoyun (李若允)	Lady Zhu, clanswoman (宗女朱氏)	NN	
Zhu Bingta, state general (奉国将军朱秉榻)
NN	Han Wen (韩文)	Lady of Jiahui village (嘉会乡君)	Lady Lei (雷氏)	
Zhu Weizheng, defender lieutenant (镇国中尉朱惟炡)
NN	Wang Shike (王世科)	Lady Zhu, clanswoman (宗女朱氏)	NN	
NN	He Ping (贺泙)	Lady Zhu, clanswoman (宗女朱氏)	NN	
State generals (奉国将军) Zhu Bingxuan (朱秉楦), Zhu Bingyou (朱秉栯), Zhu Bingrou (朱秉柔) (Note: The official sources of Ming dynasty do not specify the parents of the following princesses)
NN	Yang Hongdao (杨弘道)	Lady of Zaolin village (枣林乡君)	NN	ref
NN	Shang Cheng (商城)	Lady of Lingjiang village (凌江乡君)	NN	ref
Zhu Weixie, state lieutenant (镇国中尉朱惟焎)
NN	Zhang Yigui (张一桂)	Lady Zhu, clanswoman (宗女朱氏)	Lady Zhang (张氏)	
NN	Liu Shiying (柳时英)	Lady Zhu, clanswoman (宗女朱氏)	Lady Zhang (张氏)	
NN	Wang Jiaqi (王家奇)	Lady Zhu, clanswoman (宗女朱氏)	Lady Zhang (张氏)	
Zhu HuaiX, bulwark lieutenant (辅国中尉X)
NN	Wang Mingshi (王名世)	Lady Zhu, clanswoman (宗女朱氏)	NN	ref
NN	Cheng Xianmin (程先民)		NN	ref
Zhu Huaihu, state lieutenant (奉国中尉朱怀斛)
NN	Yan Tingjian (阎廷荐)	Lady Zhu, clanswoman (宗女朱氏)	NN	ref
Zhu Weiwu, defender lieutenant (镇国中尉朱惟熃)
NN	Zhang Yigui (张一贵)	Lady Zhu, clanswoman (宗女朱氏)	Lady Liu (恭人刘氏)	
Zhu Huai'e, bulwark lieutenant (辅国中尉朱怀堮)
NN	Cui Erkui (崔尔逵)	Lady Zhu, clanswoman (宗女朱氏)	NN	
Zhu Gonghuo, defender general (镇国将军朱公镬)
NN	Tian Dajing (田大经)	Lady of Fenghua commandery (风化郡君)	NN	
Zhu Chengle, bulwark general (辅国将军朱诚泐)
NN	Xu Zhi (徐植)	Lady of the county (县君)	NN	
Zhu Zhiduo, defender general (镇国将军朱志埵)
1460	Guan Lin (关临)	Lady of Zhangwu commandery (彰武郡君)	NN	
Zhu Gongkai, bulwark general (辅国将军朱公铠)
NN	Ji Yu (纪昱)	Lady of Luojiao county (洛交县君)	Lady Zhang (张氏)	
Zhu Bingyou, defender lieutenant (镇国中尉朱秉柚)
NN	Ren Shi (任仕)	Lady of Leitan village (雷潭乡君)	NN	
NN	Wei Guangheng (魏光恒)	Lady of Luoxi village (罗溪乡君)	NN	
NN	Xing Jie (邢节)	Lady Zhu, clanswoman (宗女朱氏)	NN	
NN	Liu Jia (刘槚)	Lady Zhu, clanswoman (宗女朱氏)	NN	
Zhu WeiX, bulwark lieutenant (辅国中尉朱惟X)
NN	Zhao Bingde (赵秉德)	Lady Zhu, clanswoman (宗女朱氏)	NN	
Zhu Gongyu, bulwark general (辅国将军朱公鋊)
NN	Bai Hui (白惠)	Lady of Suixi county (遂溪县君)	Lady Lei (雷氏)	
NN	He Ming (何铭)	Lady of Zichuan county (缁川县君)	Lady Lei (雷氏)	
Zhu Chengyin, state general (奉国将军朱诚溵)
NN	Yu Guan (于倌)	Lady of Yaoyang village (耀阳乡君)	Lady Meng (孟氏)	
Zhu Weiye, bulwark lieutenant (辅国中尉朱惟煠)
NN	Nie Yingcheng (聂应承)	Lady Zhu, clanswoman (宗女朱氏)	NN	
Zhu Weiqiu, bulwark lieutenant (辅国中尉朱惟煪)
NN	Liu Bangyin (刘邦银)	Lady Zhu, clanswoman (宗女朱氏)	Lady Wang (王氏)	
NN	Yao Laibin (姚来宾)	Lady Zhu, clanswoman (宗女朱氏)	Lady Wang (王氏)	
NN	Nie Congde (聂从德)	Lady Zhu, clanswoman (宗女朱氏)	Lady Wang (王氏)	
Zhu Huaiyan, state lieutenant (奉国中尉朱怀壛)
NN	Zhang Guoyong (张国用)	Zhu Dajie, clanswoman (宗女朱大姐)	NN	
Zhu JingX, state lieutenant (奉国中尉朱敬X)
NN	Lei Guangzhan (雷光展)	Zhu Dajie, clanswoman (宗女朱大姐)	NN	
NN	Zhang Yu (张昱)	Zhu Erjie, clanswoman (宗女朱二姐)	NN	
NN	Gan Yide (甘遗德)	Zhu Sanjie, clanswoman (宗女朱三姐)	NN	
NN	Jiang Jingyuan (蒋靖远)	Zhu Wujie, clanswoman (宗女朱五姐)	NN	
Zhu Chenghong, state general (奉国将军朱诚渱)
NN	Luo Qi (罗绮)	Lady of Liling village (醴陵乡君)	NN	
Zhu Jingyong, Prince Zhaoxian of Yongshou (永寿昭宪王朱敬镛)
NN	Li Yongfang (李永芳)	Princess of Ningchuan county (宁川县主)	NN	

Prince of Heyang (合阳王)
Prince consort	Princess	Mother	References
Zhu Bingxi, Prince Anxi of Heyang (郃阳安僖王朱秉檄)
Xin Dabin (辛大宾)	Princess of Zhanyi county (沾益县主)	Princess consort, Lady Liu (王妃刘氏)	
Zhu Chengfen, defender general (镇国将军朱诚汾)
Gao Tingbi (高廷弼)	Lady of Shanghe commandery (商河郡君)	Lady Zeng (曾氏)	
Zhu Weiyi, state general (奉国将军朱惟熠)
Lü Yingke (吕应科)	Lady of Ziyun village (紫云乡君)	Lady Zhong (仲氏)	
Peng Cheng'en (彭承恩)	Lady of Chiban village (赤坂乡君)	Lady Zhong (仲氏)	
Zhu Huaiqiao (朱怀墝), Zhu Huaibian (朱怀𡒳), Zhu Huaitu (朱怀土), Zhu Huaisu (朱怀塐), defender lieutenants
Shi Xun (师训)	Lady Zhu, clanswoman (宗女朱氏)	Lady Li (李氏), Lady Pu (蒲氏), Lady Yang (杨氏), Lady Wang (王氏), NN	
Zhang Ziying (张子英)	Lady Zhu, clanswoman (宗女朱氏)	Lady Li (李氏), Lady Pu (蒲氏), Lady Yang (杨氏), Lady Wang (王氏), NN	
Zhu Jingfu, bulwark lieutenant (辅国中尉朱敬鉘)
Wang Yuanzuo (王元佐)	Lady Zhu, clanswoman (宗女朱氏)	Lady Zhang (宜人张氏)	
Zhu Yiti, state lieutenant (奉国中尉朱谊𣹲)
Li Shichang (李时畅)	Lady Zhu, clanswoman (宗女朱氏)	Lady Xu (安人许氏)	
Han Zhong (韩仲)	Lady Zhu, clanswoman (宗女朱氏)	Lady Xu (安人许氏)	
Zhu Huaijun, defender lieutenant (镇国中尉朱怀埈)
Zhang Chunguang (张纯光)	Lady Zhu, clanswoman (宗女朱氏)	Lady Duan (段氏)	
Zhu Huaisu, defender lieutenant (镇国中尉朱怀塑)
Zhao Shijun (赵仕俊)	Lady Zhu, clanswoman (宗女朱氏)	Lady Chen (陈氏)	
Li Yuchun (李遇春)	Lady Zhu, clanswoman (宗女朱氏)	Lady Chen (陈氏)	
Zhu Jingchan, bulwark lieutenant (辅国中尉朱敬𨩱)
Wang Yangqi (王养气)	Lady Zhu, clanswoman (宗女朱氏)	Lady Yao (姚氏)	
Zhu Bingmao, bulwark general (辅国将军朱秉楙)
Wang Ping (王玶)	Lady of Fucheng county (富城县君)	Lady Hu (胡氏)	
Zhu Bingjia, bulwark general (辅国将军朱秉㮖)
Wang Deng (王灯)	Lady of Jurong county (句容县君)	NN	
Zhu Chengli, former defender general (镇国将军/庶人朱诚溧)
Yan Xiyue (燕希钺)	Lady of Shunyi commandery (顺义郡君)	NN	
Zhu Bingyi, bulwark general (辅国将军朱秉杝)
Ji Menglin (吉梦麟)	Lady of Kunshan county (崐山县君)	NN	

==== Prince of Jin ====
Year	Prince consort	Princess	Mother	References
Zhu Gang, Prince Gong of Jin (晋恭王朱㭎)
NN	Kang Dengyun (康登云)	Commandery Princess of Shouyang (寿阳郡主)	Princess Consort Gong of Jin, lady Xie	
1403	Chen Bin (陈斌)	Commandery Princess of Rongcheng (容城郡主)	Princess Consort Gong of Jin, lady Xie	
Zhu Jixi, Prince Ding of Jin (晋定王朱济熹)
1412	Tao Chun (陶春)	Commandery Princess of Ningxiang (宁乡郡主)	Princess Consort Ding of Jin, lady Fu	
1415	Jiang Yong (姜镛)	Commandery Princess of Anyi (安邑郡主)	Princess Consort Ding of Jin, lady Fu	
1431	Gao Xun (高逊)	Commandery Princess of Lingshi (灵石郡主)	Lady Qu	
1431	Cao Xiang (曹祥)	Commandery Princess of Wenshui (文水郡主)	Lady Xu	
1431	Luo Shan (骆善)	Commandery Princess of Dingxiang (定襄郡主)	Lady Du	
1438	Ma Lin (马麟)	Zhu Yuying, Commandery Princess of Pingcheng (平城郡主朱玉英)	Lady Zhang	
1441	Wang Yu (王裕)	Zhu Xiuying, Princess of Yuanqu commandery (垣曲郡主朱秀英)	Lady Zhang	
Zhu Zhiyang, Prince Duan of Jin (晋端王朱知烊)
1530s	Wang Jiugong (王九功)	Princess of Fengrun commandery (丰润郡主)	Princess Consort, lady Yin (王妃殷氏)	

===== Cadet lines =====
Prince of Qingcheng
Year	Prince consort	Princess	Mother	References
Zhu Meiqing, Prince Gongxi of Qingcheng (庆成恭僖王朱美埥)
1451	Li Fang (李芳)	Princess of Yunnei county (云内县主)	Lady Wang	
1450	Wang Dezhao (王得昭)	Princess of Pingding county (平定县主)	NN	
1450	Xu Qing (徐清)	Princess of Guangyang county (广阳县主)	NN	
1451	Xu Jin (徐进)	Princess of Daning county (大宁县主)	NN	
1451	Xie Wei (谢徽)	Princess of Yunzhong county (云中县主)	NN	
1451	Wei Jing (卫景)	Princess of Lishi county (离石县主)	NN	
1451	Liu Qin (刘钦)	Princess of Dongteng county (东藤县主)	NN	
1454	Luo Tan (罗潭)	Princess of Xinhe county (新河县主)	NN	

Prince of Guangchang
Year	Prince consort	Princess	Mother	References
Zhu Jihe, Prince Daoping of Guangchang (广昌悼平王朱济熇)
1432	Li Kai (李恺)	Princess of Tunliu commandery (屯留县主)	Lady Liu (刘氏)	

Prince of Jiyang (吉阳王)
Year	Prince consort	Princess	Mother	References
NN
1500	Wang Hui (汪蕙)	Lady of Changle commandery (长乐郡君)	NN	
1500	Li Gui (李桂)	Princess of Cile county (慈乐县主)	NN	

Prince of Fangshan
	Prince consort	Princess	Mother	References
Zhu Meiyuan, Prince Zhuangxian of Fangshan (方山庄宪王朱美垣)
1458	Yang Tong (杨通)	Princess of Yifang county (宜芳县主)	Lady Xu (王妃许氏)	
Zhu Zhongting, Prince of Fangshan (方山王朱钟铤)
1515	Tian Pu (田朴)	Princess of county (县主)	Lady Yu (于氏)	
Zhu Qihuan, defender general (镇国将军朱奇洹)
1494	Zhang Long (张龙)	Lady of Queshan commandery (确山郡君)	NN	

Prince of Ninghua (宁化王)
Year	Prince consort	Princess	Mother	References
Zhu Jihuan, Prince Yijian of Ninghua (宁化懿简王朱济焕)
1430	Zhang Zhong (章种)	Princess of Fushan county (浮山县主)	Lady Sun (王妃孙氏)	
1430	Zhou Xu (周旭)	Princess of Quwo county (曲沃县主)	Lady Sun (王妃孙氏)	
Zhu Meihe, defender general (镇国将军朱美垎)
1462	Liu Jiang (刘江)	Lady of Leyang commandery (乐阳郡君)	Lady Chen (陈氏)	
Zhu Qijian, state general (奉国将军朱奇涀)
NN	Niu Wu (牛鹉)	Lady of Wuyi village (武义乡君)	Lady Zhang (张氏)	
NN	Wu Meng (吴孟)	Lady of Zhecheng village (柘城乡君)	Lady Fan (樊氏)	
NN	Guo Chenshan (郭陈善)	Lady of village (乡君)	Lady Fan (樊氏)	
Zhu Meirang, Prince Xishun of Ninghua (宁化僖顺王朱美壤)
1454	Li Shi (李氏)	Princess of Runan village (汝南县主)	Lady Zhao (赵氏)	
Zhu Zhimei, defender lieutenant (镇国中尉朱知脄)
NN	Wang Men (王门)	Lady Zhu, clanswoman (宗女朱氏)	Lady Zhang (张氏)	

Prince of Jiaocheng
Year	Prince consort	Princess	Mother	References
Zhu Meiyuan, Prince Rongshun of Jiaocheng (交城荣顺王朱美垸)
1444	Zhang Ying (张瑛)	Princess of Wanquan County (万全县主)	Princess Consort Rongshun of Jiaocheng, lady Cao	
1448	Zhang Ying (张瑛)	Princess of Pingjin County (平晋县主)	Princess Consort Rongshun of Jiaocheng, lady Cao	
1462	Yu Xiang (于翔)	Princess of Xinle County (新乐县主)	Princess Consort Rongshun of Jiaocheng, lady Cao	

Prince of Yonghe
Year	Prince consort	Princess	Mother	References
Zhu Jilang, Prince Zhaoding of Yonghe (永和昭定王朱济烺)
NN	Li Chong (李珫)	Princess of Shilou county (石楼县主)	NN	
NN	Wu Liang (吴谅)	Princess of Zhaocheng county (赵城县主)	NN	
NN	Wang Ying (王瑛)	Princess of Hequ county (河曲县主)	NN	
1451	Xia Zan (夏瓒)	Princess of Pingchi county (平池县主)	NN	
1454	Yu Deng (于澄)	Princess of Puxian county (浦县县主)	NN	
1455	Chen Jian (陈谏)	Princess of Linxian county (临县县主)	NN	
1470	Huang Qing (黄庆)	Princess of Xingxian county (兴县县主)	NN	

Prince of Linquan
Year	Prince consort	Princess	Mother	References
Zhu Meiyong, Prince Zhuangjian of Linquan (临泉庄简王朱美塎)
1458	Cui Zhao (崔钊)	Princess of Honghua county (弘化县主)	Princess Consort, Lady Geng	
1460	Jiang Hao (江浩)	Princess of Lingshan county(灵山县主)	Princess Consort, Lady Geng	

Prince of Yangqu
Prince consort	Princess	Mother	References
Zhu Meiguang, Prince Rongjing of Yangqu (阳曲荣靖王朱美垙)
Wang Tang (王镗)	Princess of Fangshan county (房山县主)	Lady Gui (王妃桂氏)	
Zhu Xinti, bulwark lieutenant (辅国中尉朱新堤)
Fan Bing (樊屏)	Lady Zhu, clanswoman (宗女朱氏)	Lady Wei (魏氏)	
Ma Tiyi (马体益)	Lady Zhu, clanswoman (宗女朱氏)	Lady Wei (魏氏)	
Kang Ti (亢体)	Lady Zhu, clanswoman (宗女朱氏)	Lady Wei (魏氏)	
Pei Chengming (裴承命)	Lady Zhu, clanswoman (宗女朱氏)	Lady Chang (常氏)	
Jia Yingxuan (贾应选)	Lady Zhu, clanswoman (宗女朱氏)	Lady Chang (常氏)	
Li Zhaodeng (李肇登)	Lady Zhu, clanswoman (宗女朱氏)	Lady Chang (常氏)	
Jiang Liangbi (姜良弼)	Lady Zhu, clanswoman (宗女朱氏)	Lady Chang (常氏)	
Zhu ShenX, state lieutenant (奉国中尉朱慎X)
Zhang Furu (张复儒)	Lady Zhu, clanswoman (宗女朱氏)	Lady Zhang (张氏)	

Prince of Xihe
Prince consort	Princess	Mother	References
Zhu Meizhun, Prince Jinggong of Xihe (西河靖恭王朱美埻)
Huai Yu (淮玉)	Princess of Zhuiping county (阜平县主)	Lady Jia (贾氏)	
Chen Mi (陈玺)	Princess of Weifen county (蔚汾县主)	Lady Jia (贾氏)	

Prince of Yunqiu
Year	Prince consort	Princess	Mother	References
Zhu Meiyu, Prince Jianjing of Yunqiu (云丘简靖王朱美堣)
1448	Zhang Hui (张惠)	Princess of Wenxi County (闻喜县主)	Princess consort, lady Zhang	
1450	Xie Sen (谢森)	Princess of Xiurong County (秀容县主)	Princess consort, lady Zhang	

==== Prince of Zhou ====
Year	Prince consort	Princess	Mother	References
Zhu Su, Prince Ding of Zhou (周定王朱橚)
1402	Pu Zichun (溥子春)	Princess of Yifeng commandery (仪封郡主)	NN	
1402	Xu Maoxian (徐茂先)	Princess of Lanyang commandery (兰阳郡主)	NN	
1404	Sheng Yu (盛瑜)	Princess of Xinyang commandery (信阳郡主)	NN	
1405	Zhang Yi (张仪)	Princess of Nanyang commandery (南阳郡主)	Ni Miaoding (倪妙定)	
1405	Cheng He (程和)	Princess of Yongcheng commandery (永城郡主)	NN	
1406	Zhang Yi (张义)	Princess of Xingyang commandery (荥阳郡主)	NN	
1406	Zhang Lin (张琳)	Princess of Xinxiang commandery (新乡郡主)	NN	
1411	Qian Qin (钱钦)	Princess of Ningling commandery (宁陵郡主)	NN	
1414	Cai Yi (蔡义)	Princess of Yi'an commandery (宜安郡主)	NN	
1411	Feng Xun (冯训)	Princess of Chenliu commandery (陈留郡主)	NN	
1431	Tian Jun (田俊)	Princess of Shangshui commandery (商水郡主)	NN	
1431	Zhuang Zhong (庄忠)	Princess of Zhongmou commandery (中牟郡主)	NN	
Zhu Tong'ao, Prince Hui of Zhou (周惠王朱同鏖)
1489	Liu Wang (柳旺)	Princess of Xiangxian commandery (相县郡主)	Lady Gao	
1492	Li Yonglu (李永禄)	Princess of Huaiji commandery (怀集郡主)	Princess consort, lady Tan	
Zhu Chaogang, Prince Zhuang of Zhou (周庄王周朝堈)
NN	Chen Yi (陈易)	Princess of Huaiqing commandery (怀庆郡主)	Lady Xu	
Zhu Suzhen, Prince Duan of Zhou (周端王朱肃溱)
NN	Duan Guoying (段国英)	Princess of Fuyuan commandery (滏源郡主)	Lady Liu	
NN	Yan Bangjun (阎邦俊)	Princess of Qinhua commandery (钦化郡主)	Lady Liu	
NN	Jia Zuocai (贾佐才)	Princess of Guwei commandery (古卫郡主)	Lady Wu	

===== Cadet lines =====
Prince of Yongning
Year	Prince consort	Princess	Mother	References
Zhu Youguang, Prince Jingxi of Yongning (永宁靖僖王朱有光)
1429	Tan Xue (谭学)	Princess of Xingze county (荥泽县主)	Lady Gao	
1429	Lei He (雷和)	Princess of Kaocheng county (考成县主)	Lady Gao	
1437	Liu Xiang (刘祥)	Princess of Dengfeng county (登封县主)	Lady Gao	
1437	Wang Ji (王纪)	Princess of Huojia county (获嘉县主)	Lady Gao	
Zhu Anfa, prince Rongmu of Yongning (永宁荣穆王朱安法)
NN	Zhao Chongshang (赵崇尚)	Princess of Wuning county (武宁县主)	NN	

Prince of Ruyang
Year	Prince consort	Princess	Mother	References
Zhu Youshan, Prince Gongxi of Ruyang (汝阳恭僖王朱有煽)
1437	Zhou Deng (周澄)	Princess of Guangshan county (光山郡主)	NN	
Before 1449	Li Zhong (李钟)	Princess of Dingcheng county (定城县主)	NN	
Before 1449	Huang Fu (黄阜)	Princess of Shenyi county (莘邑县主)	NN	
Before 1449	Yan Ai (严昹)	Princess of Xin'en county (新恩县主)	NN	
1441	Liu Bin (刘彬)	Princess of Queshan county (确山县主)	NN	
Zhu Tongzhi, Prince Anhe of Ruyang (汝阳安和王朱同铚)
1475	Lu Gonghai (卢公海)	Princess of Shexian county (涉县县主)	NN	
Zhu Anzhan, state general (奉国将军朱安湛)
NN	Zhang Kun (张琨)	Lady of village (乡君)	Lady Fu (傅氏)	

Prince of Zhenping
Year	Prince consort	Princess	Mother	References
Zhu Youguang, Prince Gongding of Zhenping (镇平恭定王朱有爌)
1437	Liang He (梁和)	Princess of Xincai county (新蔡县主)	Lady Li	
1437	Liu Cong (刘琮)	Princess of Mengjin county (孟津县主)	NN	
1442	Zheng Bian (郑昪)	Princess of Yanshi county (偃师县主)	Lady Li	
1437	Ou Jun (欧俊)	Princess of Jiyuan county (济源县主)	NN	
1437	Gong He (巩和)	Princess of Linying county (临颍县主)	NN	
1441	Fan Sheng (樊盛)	Princess of Wenxiang county (阌乡县主)	NN	
1447	Zhang Bin (张斌)	Princess of Xihua county (西华县主)	NN	
Zhu Zipeng, defender general (镇国将军朱子埄)
NN	Zuo Menglin (左梦麟)	Lady of commandery (郡君)	NN	
Zhu Tongzhu, bulwark general (辅国将军朱同鉒)
NN	Zhang Fu (张辅)	Lady of Pinglu county (平陆县君)	Lady Jia (夫人贾氏)	
NN	Zhao Zhang (赵璋)	Lady of Longxi county (陇西县君)	Lady Jia (夫人贾氏)	
Zhu MuX, defender lieutenant (镇国中尉朱睦) and others
NN	Fu Zhen (傅珍)	Lady Zhu, clanswoman (宗女朱氏)	NN	
NN	Zhang Yunlong (张云龙)	Lady Zhu, clanswoman (宗女朱氏)	NN	
NN	Wang Dahua (王大化)	Lady Zhu, clanswoman (宗女朱氏)	NN	
NN	Zhang Mei (张美)	Lady Zhu, clanswoman (宗女朱氏)	NN	
NN	Li Mou (李某)	Lady Zhu, clanswoman (宗女朱氏)	NN	
Zhu AnX, state general (奉国将军朱安X)
NN	Zheng Chaochen (郑朝臣)	Lady of Wancheng village (宛城乡君)	Lady Jia (贾氏)	
NN	Zhang Ke (张柯)	Lady of Qinggang village (青冈乡君)	Lady Jia (贾氏)	
Zhu MuX, defender lieutenant (镇国中尉朱睦), defender lieutenant Zhu Muliang (镇国中尉朱睦梁) and others
XVI-XVII cent.	Guo Wenhuan (郭文焕)	Lady Zhu, clanswoman (宗女朱氏)	NN	
XVI-XVII cent.	Li Yuanchun (李元春)	Lady Zhu, clanswoman (宗女朱氏)	NN	
XVI-XVII cent.	Shi Congyi (史从义)	Lady Zhu, clanswoman (宗女朱氏)	NN	
XVI-XVII cent.	Chu Hou (褚䪷)	Lady Zhu, clanswoman (宗女朱氏)	NN	
XVI-XVII cent.	Yang Yifeng (杨一凤)	Lady Zhu, clanswoman (宗女朱氏)	NN	
XVI-XVII cent.	Yang Dong (杨栋)	Lady Zhu, clanswoman (宗女朱氏)	NN	
XVI-XVII cent.	Zhang Dingzheng (张定正)	Lady Zhu, clanswoman (宗女朱氏)	NN	
XVI-XVII cent.	Li Jinxian (李进贤)	Lady Zhu, clanswoman (宗女朱氏)	NN	
XVI-XVII cent.	Li Wenke (李文科)	Lady Zhu, clanswoman (宗女朱氏)	NN	
XVI-XVII cent.	Tian Huolin (田获麟)	Lady Zhu, clanswoman (宗女朱氏)	NN	
Zhu QinX, bulwark lieutenant (辅国中尉朱勤X), bulwark lieutenant Zhu Qintiao (辅国中尉朱勤鲦) and others
XVIIth century	Sun Yaozu (孙耀祖)	Lady Zhu, clanswoman (宗女朱氏)	NN	
XVIIth century	Zhu Longlin (朱龙麟)	Lady Zhu, clanswoman (宗女朱氏)	NN	
XVIIth century	Yan Hunru (闫浑如)	Lady Zhu, clanswoman (宗女朱氏)	NN	

Prince of Suiping
Year	Prince consort	Princess	Mother	References
Zhu Anluo, Prince Kangmu of Suiping (遂平康穆王朱安洛)
XVI century	Zhang Feng (张凤)	Princess of Jinning county (晋宁县主)	NN	
XVI century	Liu Yao (刘尧)	Princess of Tengxian county (滕县县主)	NN	
XVI century	Wang Qi (王淇)	Princess of Qiuxian county (丘县县主)	NN	
XVI century	Liu Pei (刘佩)	Princess of Guanxian county (冠县县主)	NN	
XVI century	Shao Jing (邵璟)	Princess of Feixian county (费县县主)	NN	
XVI century	He Yongzhen (何永祯)	Princess of Xixian county (息县县主)	NN	
XVI century	Wei Ke (魏珂)	Princess of Enxian county (恩县县主)	NN	
XVI century	Si Zongyi (司宗义)	Princess of Fanxian county (范县县主)	NN	
XVI century	Hao Shouzhong (郝守中)	Princess of Huoqiu county (霍丘县主)	NN	
XVI century	Song Shouju (宋守举)	Princess of Jurong county (句容县主)	NN	
XVI century	Xu Ke (徐珂)	Princess of Longshui county (泷水县主)	NN	
XVI century	Zhang Jin (张金)	Princess of Guangyi county (广邑县主)	NN	
XVI century	Qi Xiyu (戚希禹)	Princess of Mengcheng county (蒙城县主)	NN	
Zhu Shaokun, Prince of Suiping (遂平王朱绍焜)
1640s	Cai Qiao (蔡乔)	Princess of county (县主)	Lady Wang (王妃王氏)	

Prince of Fengqiu
Year	Prince Consort	Princess	Mother	References
Zhu Youyun, Prince Kangyi of Fengqiu (封丘康懿王朱有煴)
1456	Wang Huai (王淮)	Princess of Yangdi county (阳翟县主)	Princess Consort, lady Zhang	

Prince of Neixiang
Year	Prince Consort	Princess	Mother	References
Zhu Yougang, Prince Gongzhuang of Neixiang (内乡恭庄王朱有焵)
1441	Zhang Yi (张镒)	Princess of Fugou county (扶沟县主)	Lady Zhou	
Zhu Anye, defender general (镇国将军朱安漜)
1530s	Zhang Hongquan (Note: Used courtesy name)(张洪泉)	Lady of Baling commandery (巴陵郡君)	NN	
Zhu Anlian, defender general (镇国将军朱安湅)
XVI cent.	Ji Long (集龙)	Lady of Fenyi county (分宜县君)	Lady Hou (夫人侯氏)	
XVI cent.	Zhao Jin (赵缙)	Lady of Yinjiang county (印江县君)	Lady Hou (夫人侯氏)	
XVI cent.	Zhang Sui (张璲)	Lady of Yuanmou county (元谋县君)	Lady Hou (夫人侯氏)	
XVI cent.	Pang Xiang (庞庠)	Lady of Jingyan county (井研县君)	Lady Hou (夫人侯氏)	
Zhu Muhe, bulwark general (辅国将军朱睦禾)
NN	Yan Zhi (闫支)	Lady of Shicheng county (石城县君)	Lady Dong (夫人董氏)	
NN	Li Loubei (李楼北)	Lady of Shilou county (石楼县君)	Lady Dong (夫人董氏)	
Zhu Muqu, bulwark general (辅国将军朱睦欋)
NN	Chen Zhonghou (陈仲厚)	Lady of Longhua county (龙化县君)	Lady Wei (夫人魏氏)	
NN	Guo Sanjie (郭三戒)	Lady of Juancheng county (鄄城县君)	Lady Wei (夫人魏氏)	
NN	Zhao Jiu (赵鸠)	Lady of Jingcheng county (景城县君)	Lady Wei (夫人魏氏)	

Prince of Zuocheng
Year	Prince Consort	Princess	Mother	References
Zhu Youqiao, Prince Zhuangjian of Zuocheng (胙城庄简王朱有燆)
1451	Yang Neng (杨能)	Princess of Xiangyi county (襄邑县主)	NN	
1451	Huo Jian (霍鉴)	Princess of county (县主)	NN	
Zhu Anliu, Prince Xuanjing of Zuocheng (胙城宣靖王朱安浏)
1530s	Lei Qiyuan (雷启元)	Princess of Yizhang county (宜章县主)	Lady Su	
1530s	Fu Xi (傅玺)	Princess of Yongjia county (永嘉县主)	Lady Su	
1530s	Hou Xiang (侯相)	Prince of Heng'an county (恒安县主)	Lady Su	
1530s	Wu Tong (吴桐)	Princess of Lanxian county (岚县县主)	Lady Su	
Zhu Qinshi, bulwark lieutenant (辅国中尉朱勤⿺是火)
NN	Yin Sanjun (尹三俊)	Lady Zhu, clanswoman (宗女朱氏)	Lady Jiang (宜人姜氏)	
NN	Bai Chun (白椿)	Lady Zhu, clanswoman (宗女朱氏)	Lady Jiang (宜人姜氏)	
NN	Li Yangxing (李养性)	Lady Zhu, clanswoman (宗女朱氏)	Lady Jiang (宜人姜氏)	
NN	Wang Chengzhao (汪城诏)	Lady Zhu, clanswoman (宗女朱氏)	Lady Jiang (宜人姜氏)	
NN	Gong Minli (龚民立)	Lady Zhu, clanswoman (宗女朱氏)	Lady Jiang (宜人姜氏)	
Zhu ChaoX, state lieutenant (奉国中尉朱朝X)
NN	Liu Yongzuo (刘永祚)	Lady Zhu, clanswoman (宗女朱氏)	Lady Chen (陈氏), Lady Zhang (张氏), lady Wu (吴氏)	

Prince of Yanling
Year	Prince Consort	Princess	Mother	References
Zhu Tongsi, Prince Jingjian of Yanling (鄢陵靖简王朱同鋖)
1500s	Pan Xineng (潘希能)	Princess of Hancheng county (韩城县主)	Lady Wei (夫人魏氏)	
Zhu Anyuan, Prince Duanxi of Yanling (鄢陵端僖王朱安沅)
1540s	Zhang Long (张隆)	Princess of Wen'an county (文安县主)	Princess Consort, lady Li (王妃李氏)	
1540s	Sun Hanwen (孙翰文)	Princess of Tongling county (铜陵县主)	Princess Consort, lady Li (王妃李氏)	
1540s	Liu Qi (刘麒)	Princess of Nanhai county (南海县主)	Princess Consort, lady Li (王妃李氏)	
1540s	Guo Chen (郭臣)	Princess of Minqing county (闽清县主)	NN	
1540s	Wang Yuanyou (王元佑)	Princess of Wanning county (万宁县主)	NN	
Zhu Anpiao, defender general (镇国将军朱安漂)
NN	Wei Xiongcai (魏雄才)	Lady of Huzhou county (湖州郡君)	Lady Wang (夫人王氏)	

Prince of Boping (博平王)
Prince Consort	Princess	Mother	References
Zhu Anxu, Prince Gongyu of Boping (博平恭裕王朱安淢)
Sheng Shisheng (盛时升)	Princess of Jinxian county (金县县主)	Lady Dai (戴氏)	
Yang Ruzhou (杨汝舟)	Princess of Jingyang county (泾阳县主)	Lady Zhang (张氏)	
Wang Ke (王恪)	Princess of Danxian county (单县县主)	Lady Liu (刘氏)	

Prince of Yingchuan
Year	Prince Consort	Princess	Mother	References
Zhu Mucai, Prince Gongshun of Yinchuan (颍川恭顺王朱睦棌)
1570s	Zhang Shangwen (张尚文)	Princes of Ningpu county (宁浦县主)	NN	
1570s	Pang Fengyang (厐凤阳)	Princess of Nanbo county (南波县主)	NN	
1570s	Lei Sanren (雷三仁)	Princess of Xinling county (信陵县主)	NN	
1570s	Guan Dami (关大谧)	Princess of Pingqiu county (平丘县主)	NN	
Zhu Qinxi, defender general (镇国将军朱勤燨) and other
XVII cent.	Zhang Shouye (张守业)	Lady of Shuiluo commandery (水洛郡君)	NN	

==== Prince of Chu ====
Year	Prince consort	Princess	Mother	References
Zhu Zhen, Prince Zhao of Chu (楚昭王朱桢)
1398	Ma Zhu (马注)	Princess of Huarong commandery (华容郡主)	Princess Consort Zhao of Chu, lady Wang	
1402	Geng Xiu (耿琇)	Princess of Qinxiang commandery (清湘郡主)	Princess Consort Zhao of Chu, lady Wang	
1407	Wei Ning(魏宁)	Princess of Anxiang Commandery (安乡郡主)	Lady Pan	
1410	Zhang Jian (张鉴)	Princess of Fengyang Commandery (沣阳郡主)	Lady Li	
1415	Ge Long (葛隆)	Princess of Xingning Commandery (兴宁郡主)	Lady Hua	
1415	Li Deng (李澄)	Princess of Qiyang Commandery (祁阳郡主)	Lady Li	
Zhu Mengwan, Prince Zhuang of Chu (楚庄王朱孟烷)
1428	Liu Xian (刘显)	Princess of Xinhua Commandery (新化郡主)	Princess Consort Zhuang of Chu, Lady Deng	
1436	Wang Qian (王谦)	Princess of Xiangxiang Commandery (湘乡郡主)	Princess Consort Zhuang of Chu, Lady Deng	
Zhu Huakui, Prince Ding of Chu (楚定王朱华奎)
1643	Wang Guozi (王国梓)	Princess of commandery Zhu Fengde (郡主朱凤德)	NN	

===== Cadet lines =====
Prince of Yong'an
Year	Prince consort	Princess	Mother	References
Zhu Mengjiong, Prince Yijian of Yong'an (永安懿简王朱孟炯)
1436	Chen Yan (陈衍)	Princess of Gong'an County (公安县主)	Lady Wang	
1448	Wang Zheng (王正)	Princess of Jiayu County (嘉鱼县主)	Princess Consort, lady Zhao	

Prince of Shouchang

Prince of Shouchang
Year	Prince consort	Princess	Mother	References
Zhu Mengchao, Prince Anxi of Shouchang (永安懿简王朱孟朝)
1448	Zhang Xin (张信)	Princess of Anren County (安仁县主)	Lady Mu (王妃沐氏)	

Prince of Chongyang
Year	Prince consort	Princess	Mother	References
Zhu Mengwei, Prince Jingjian of Chongyang (崇阳靖简王朱孟炜)
1436	Peng Fu (彭福)	Princess of Shanhua County (善化县主)	Lady Ling (夫人凌氏)	
Zhu Jidie, Prince Zhuangxi of Chongyang (崇阳庄僖王朱季堞)
1460	Peng Huan (彭欢)	Princess of Yongcheng County (庸城县主)	Princess Consort, Lady Cheng (成氏)	

Prince of Tongshan
Year	Prince consort	Princess	Mother	Issue	References
Zhu Mengyue, Prince Jinggong of Tongshan (通山靖恭王朱孟爚)
1437	Jiang Min (姜敏)	Princess of Yizhang County (宜章县主)	Princess Consort, lady Wu		
1436	Zhang Lin (张琳)	Princess of Taoyuan County (桃源县主)	Lady Guo		
1450	Li Chan (李旵)	Princess of Macheng county (麻城县主) (Note: The married failed because of princess' death)	Lady Guo		
1450	Wei Xuan (魏宣)	Princess of Guiyang County (桂阳县主)	Lady Guo	3 children	

Prince of Tongcheng
Year	Prince consort	Princess	Mother	References
Zhu Mengcan, Prince Zhuangjing of Tongcheng (通城庄靖王朱孟灿)
1428	Guo Cheng (郭成)	Princess of Luotian county (罗田县主)	Princess Consort, Lady Cheng	
1441	Zhang Rui (章锐)	Princess of Cili county (慈利县主)	Princess Consort, Lady Wang	
Zhu Jichang, Prince Rongshun of Tongcheng (通城荣顺王朱季土尝)
1451	Xiong Ning (熊宁)	Lady of Huitong commandery (会同郡君)	Princess Consort, lady Liu	

Prince of Jiangxia
Year	Prince consort	Princess	Mother	References
Zhu Mengju, Prince Kangjing of Jiangxia (江夏康靖王朱孟炬)
1441	He Cheng (贺诚)	Princess of Puqi County (蒲圻县主)	Princess Consort, lady Hao	
1441	Yang Yu (杨誉)	Princess of Chenxi County (辰溪县主)	Princess Consort, lady Hao	

==== Prince of Qi ====
Main line
Prince consort	Princess	Mother	References
Zhu Qingzhai (朱庆寨)
Liu Guodong (刘国栋)	Lady Zhu, clanswoman (宗女朱氏)	Lady Chen (陈氏)	
Xu Yongjia (徐永嘉)	Lady Zhu, clanswoman (宗女朱氏)	Lady Chen (陈氏)	
Yan Zhuo (颜倬)	Lady Zhu, clanswoman (宗女朱氏)	Lady Chen (陈氏)	
Shou Guobin (寿国宾)	Lady Zhu, clanswoman (宗女朱氏)	Lady Chen (陈氏)	
Zhu Ruichun (朱睿焞)
Dong Tianyin (董天胤)	Lady Zhu, clanswoman (宗女朱氏)	Lady Tang (汤氏)	
Wang Yizhi (王抑之)	Lady Zhu, clanswoman (宗女朱氏)	Lady Tang (汤氏)	
Xu Zhi (徐袠)	Lady Zhu, clanswoman (宗女朱氏)	Lady Tang (汤氏)	
Zhu Ruixi (朱睿熺)
Jiang Zhiji (蒋之机)	Lady Zhu, clanswoman (宗女朱氏)	Lady Chen (陈氏)	

==== Prince of Lu ====
Year	Prince consort	Princess	Mother	References
Zhu Zhaohun, Prince Jing of Lu (鲁靖王朱肇𪸩)
1427	Zhao Xuan (赵瑄)	Princess of Zhucheng commandery (诸城郡主)	Princess Consort Jing of Lu, Lady Yan (严氏)	
1427	Kong Xigong (孔希恭)	Princess of Wendeng commandery (文登郡主)	Princess Consort Jing of Lu, Lady Yan (严氏)	
1427	Li Rang (李让)	Princess of Yuncheng commandery (郓城郡主)	Princess Consort Jing of Lu, Lady Yan (严氏)	
1437	Tang Wenzan (汤文瓒)	Princess of Fushan commandery (福山郡主)	Princess Consort Jing of Lu, Lady Yan (严氏)	
Zhu Taikan, Prince Hui of Lu (鲁惠王朱泰堪)
1457	Feng Jia (冯佳)	Princess of Qixia commandery (栖霞郡主)	Princess Consort Hui of Lu, Lady Zhao	
Chenghua era	NN	Princess of Zhangqiu commandery (章丘郡主)	Princess Consort Hui of Lu, Lady Zhao	
Zhu Yangzhu, Prince Zhuang of Lu (鲁庄王朱阳铸)
1498	Lu Weizhong (卢惟中)	Princess of Xinyi commandery (新义郡主)	Princess Consort Zhuang of Lu, Lady Zhang	
Zhu Yihai, Prince of Lu (鲁王朱以海)
1660s	Zhang Yanchang (张衍昌)	Princess of commandery (郡主)	Lady Zhang, Second Princess Consort of Lu (继妃张氏)	
1660s	Zheng Cong (郑聪)	Princess of commandery (郡主)	Lady Chen, Secondary Princess Consort of Lu (次妃陈氏)	
1660s	Zheng Zhefei (郑哲飞)	Princess of commandery (郡主), aka Princess of Lu Princedom (鲁王公主)	Lady Chen, Secondary Princess Consort Zhen of Lu (次贞妃陈氏)	

===== Cadet lines =====
Prince of Anqiu
Year	Prince consort	Princess	Mother	References
Zhu Dangsui, Prince Rongshun of Anqiu (安丘榮順王朱當澻)
1500	Kong Chengxu (孔承需)	Princess of Qingcheng county (青城县主)	Second Princess Consort of Anqiu, Lady Kong	
1500	Wang Shunkui (王舜夔)	Princess of Ningling county (宁陵县主)	Second Princess Consort of Anqiu, Lady Kong	
Bulwark general Zhu Dangfu (辅国将军朱当泭)
1520s	Lei Yingjie (雷应节)	Lady of Zhaocheng county (赵城县君)	Lady Ma	
1520s	Zhou Fu (周辅)	Lady of Xinxiang county (新乡县君)	Lady Ma	
1520s	Huang Lu (黄录)	Lady of Xinzheng county (新郑县君)	Lady Ma	
State general Zhu Jianshao (奉国将军朱健杓)
1530s	Zhang Zhe (张折)	Lady of Anding village (安定乡君)	Lady Wang	
Bulwark general Zhu Huanye (辅国将军朱欢烨)
1550s	Cheng Yiyuan (程一元)	Lady of Jingfu county (景福县君)	NN	
1550s	Gong Jixian (宫继贤)	Lady of Xiantan county (仙潭县君)	NN	
1550s	Li Yi (李镒)	Lady of Nanyan county (南岩县君)	NN	
1550s	Li Zi (李滋)	Lady Zhu, clanswoman (朱氏)	NN	

Prince of Juye（钜野王）
Prince consort	Princess	Mother	References
Zhu Taideng, Prince Xishun of Juye (钜野僖顺王朱泰墱)
Chen Li (陈礼)	Princess of Sishui county (泗水县主)	Princess Consort, Lady Li (李氏)	
NN	Princess of Yidou county (益都县主)	NN	
Defender general Zhu Yangshu (镇国将军朱阳鉥)
Liang E (梁鹗)	Lady of Guancheng commandery (观城郡君)	Lady Deng (邓氏)	
NN	Lady of Wenshang commandery (汶上郡君)	Lady Deng (邓氏)	
State general Zhu Jiancui (奉国将军朱健榱)
Huang Siming (黄思明)	Lady of Baozhong village (褒中乡君)	Lady Yang (杨氏)	
Xu Shu (徐枢)	Lady of Linqiu village (廪丘乡君)	Lady Yang (杨氏)	
Defender general Zhu Yangzi (镇国将军朱阳锱)
Yang Shangwen (杨尚文)	Lady of Xiajin commandery (夏津郡君)	Lady Zhang (张氏)	
State general Zhu Jianjiang (奉国将军朱健桨)
Jiang Zhijing (姜知敬)	Lady of Wenyang village (汶阳乡君)	NN	
Defender lieutenant Zhu Huanxia (镇国中尉朱欢烚)
Li Dongyan (李东岩)	Lady Zhu, clanswoman (宗女朱氏)	NN	
Hu Yanzhi (胡严智)	Lady Zhu, clanswoman (宗女朱氏)	NN	
Wang Shilu (王世禄)	Lady Zhu, clanswoman (宗女朱氏)	NN	
State general Zhu Jianzhi (奉国将军朱健𬃊)
Cai Mei (蔡梅)	Lady of Andong village (安东乡君)	Lady Meng	
Ying Zhao (应诏)	Lady of Huling village (湖陵乡君)	Lady Meng	
Bulwark general Zhu Jianrong (辅国将军朱健荣;1428-1529)
Wang Xun (王勋)	Lady of Qinghe county (清河县君)	Lady Wang	
Jie Liang (解谅)	Lady of Yingshan county (应山县君)	Lady Wang	
Prince Zhuanghui of Juye Zhu Danghan (钜野庄惠王朱当涵)
Xiao Cong (萧聪)	Princess of Anping county (安平县主)	Princess Consort, Lady Sun	
Zhao Fan (赵璠)	Princess of XTong county (X同县主)	Princess Consort, Lady Sun	
Wang Wei (王巍)	Princess of Xingyang county (荥阳县主)	Princess Consort, Lady Sun	
Defender general Zhu Huanguang (镇国将军朱欢光)
Mu Kongjia (穆孔加)	Lady of Cheng commandery (X城郡君)	Lady Cui	
Wang Zhiyu (王之育)	Lady of Xinluo commandery (新罗郡君)	Lady Cui	
Ma Sanqian (马三千)	Lady of Luohu commandery (罗湖郡君)	Lady Cui	
Kong Wenmo (孔闻谟)	Lady Zhu, clanswoman (宗女朱氏)	NN	

Prince of Dong'e
Year	Prince consort	Princess	Mother	References
Prince Rongjing of Dong'e Zhu Yangbiao (东阿荣靖王朱阳镖)
	Zhang Jun (张俊)	Princess of Lincheng county (临城县主)	Lady Kong	
Bulwark general Zhu Dangbo (辅国将军朱当渤)
	Tian Yangmin (田养民)	Lady of Dengfeng county (登封县君)	Lady	
	Gao Kui (高魁)	Lady of Qingtian county (青田县君)	Lady	
	Wang Yingkui (王应奎)	Lady of Shidai county (石埭县君)	Lady	
State general Zhu Jiangeng (奉国将军朱健梗)
1544	Ding Wen (丁文)	Lady of Jingxing village (井陉乡君)	Lady Ren	
	Wang Congxun (王从训)	Lady of Lingchuan village (陵川乡君)	Lady Ren	
Defender lieutenant Zhu Huanlan (镇国中尉朱欢烂)
	Liu Jimin (刘济民)	Lady Zhu, clanswoman (宗女朱氏)	NN	
	Wan Huairen (万怀仁)	Lady Zhu, clanswoman (宗女朱氏)	NN	

Prince of Ziyang
Prince consort	Princess	Mother	References
Bulwark general Zhu Huanjiong (辅国将军朱欢炯)
Wang Zhisi (王之嗣)	Lady of Anping county (安平县君)	Lady Wang	

Prince of Yangxin
Prince consort	Princess	Mother	References
Prince Zhaoding of Yangxin Zhu Yishu (阳信昭定王朱以澍)
Yang Yingxun (杨应训)	Princess of Yongshou county (永寿县主)	Lady Zeng	
Kong Zhi (孔氏)	Princess of the county (县主)	Lady Zeng	
Gong Xiucong (巩秀丛)	Princess of the county (县主)	Lady Zeng	

Prince of Gaomi
Prince consort	Princess	Mother	References
Zhu Dangmei, Prince Kangmu of Gaomi (高密康穆王朱当湄)
Cheng Dayong (程大用)	Princess of Huating county (华庭县主)	Lady Gao	
Zhu Jianshi, Prince Anjian of Gaomi (高密安简王朱健栻)
Lu Dai (陆岱)	Princess of Yangxia county (阳夏县主)	Lady Wang	
Bai Dacai (白大材)	Princess of Xianyuan county (仙源县主)	Lady Wang	
Zhu Jiankui, defender general (镇国将军朱健樻)
Ma Kouzhou (马口州)	Lady of Pengchi commandery (蓬池郡君)	NN	

Prince of Xincai
Prince consort	Princess	Mother	References
Zhu Shoulian, bulwark general, manager of Xincai feudatory (辅国将军朱寿炼)
Wang Biao (王镳)	Princess of Huating county (鱼丘县君)	Lady Liu (刘氏)	

==== Prince of Shu ====
Year	Prince consort	Princess	Mother	References
Zhu Chun, Prince Xian of Shu (蜀献王朱椿)
1406	Gao Zui (高最)	Princess of Changning commandery (长宁郡主)	NN	
1411	Gu Zhan (顾瞻)	Princess of Fushun commandery (富顺郡主)	NN	
1411	Wu Yu (吴瑜)	Princess of Suining commandery (遂宁郡主)	NN	
1417	Guan Neng (管能)	Zhu Miaoyin, Princess of Jiangjin commandery (江津郡主朱妙音)	Lady Fang (方氏)	
1417	Lei An (雷安)	Princess of Pujiang commandery (蒲江郡主)	NN	
1417	Li Liang (李亮)	Princess of Jintang commandery (金堂郡主)	NN	
1417	Wang Hong (王宏)	Princess of Zhaohua commandery (昭化郡主)	NN	
1417	Lu Nai (卢鼐)	Princess of Shunqing commandery (顺庆郡主)	NN	
1417	Jia Sheng (家晟)	Princess of Jiang'an commandery (江安郡主)	NN	
Yongle era	NN	Princess of Mingshan commandery (名山郡主)	NN	
Zhu Shenzao, Prince Hui of Shu (蜀惠王朱申鑿)
1504	Chen Kui (陈葵)	Princess of Emei commandery (蛾眉郡主)	Princess Consort Lady Liang (王妃梁氏)	

Cadet lines

Prince of Huayang (华阳王)
Year	Prince consort	Princess	Mother	References
Zhu Bincheng, Prince Gongshun of Huayang (华阳恭顺王朱宾泟)
NN	Zhang Kun (张鹍)	Princess of county (县主)	Lady Zou (邹氏)	
Defender general Zhu Xuanfeng (镇国将军朱宣封)
NN	Sun Shangdeng	Lady of Yuping commandery (玉屏郡君)	Lady Ran (冉氏)	
Supporting general Zhu Zhichun (奉国将军朱至淳)
NN	Guo Dayi (郭大仪)	Lady Zhu, clanswoman (宗女朱氏)	Lady Wu (吴氏)	

==== Prince of Dai ====
Year	Prince consort	Princess	Mother	References
Zhu Gui, Prince Jian of Dai (代简王朱桂)
1429	Fan Qin (范钦)	Princess of Xiangning commandery (乡宁郡主)	Princess consort, lady Xu	
1437	Qin An (秦安)	Princess of Huguan commandery (胡关郡主)	Lady Liu	
1441	Chang Ji (常济)	Princess of Baode commandery (保德郡主)	Lady Xu	
Zhu Xuntuan, Prince Li of Dai (代戾王朱逊煓)
1437	Yang Zhen (杨真)	Princess of Mayi county (马邑县主)	Lady Hu (胡氏)	
Zhu Shichan, Prince Yin of Dai (代隐王朱仕壥)
1450	Xu Cong (许琮)	Princess of Jushun commandery (居顺郡主)	NN	
1450	Xu Guang (徐广)	Princess of Jinning commandery (晋宁郡主)	NN	
1450	Liu Wen (刘文)	Princess of Wencheng commandery (文成郡主)	NN	
Zhu Junzhang, Prince Yi of Dai (代懿王朱俊杖)
NN	Li Shixi (李时熙)	Princess of Lingshou commandery (灵寿郡主)	Lady Zhang, Princess Consort	
NN	Li Yingchun (李应春)	Princess of Wangjiang commandery (望江郡主)	Lady Zhang, Princess Consort	

===== Cadet lines =====
Prince of Guangling
Year	Prince Consort	Princess	Mother	References
Zhu Xunmin, Prince Rongxu of Guangling (广灵荣虚王朱逊𤇜)
1451	Qi Guangtai (齐光泰)	Princess of Huoshan county (霍山县主)	NN	

Prince of Lingqiu
Year	Prince Consort	Princess	Mother	References
Zhu Xunquan, Prince Rongshun of Lingqiu (灵丘荣顺王朱逊烇)
1450s	Zhang Hui (张惠)	Princess of Wenxi county (闻喜县主)	Lady Guo (郭氏)	
1459	Gu Chun (古淳)	Princess of Lincheng county (临城县主)	Lady Guo (郭氏)	
Zhu Shimian, Prince Xijing of Lingqiu (靈丘僖靖朱仕𡒳)
1489	Zhao Ding (趙定)	Lady of Luchuan commandery (陸川郡君)	Lady Xie	
Zhu Congcong, defender lieutenant (镇国中尉朱聪漎)
NN	Hao Sanle (郝三乐)	Lady Zhu (朱氏)	Lady Chen (陈氏)	

Prince of Xuanning
Year	Prince consort	Princess	Mother	References
Zhu Xunliao, Prince Jingzhuang of Xuanning (宣宁靖庄王朱逊炓)
1460	Yuan Hong (袁宏)	Princess of Xinhe county (新河县主)	NN	

Prince of Huairen
Year	Prince consort	Princess	Mother	References
Zhu Xunhui, Prince Rongding of Huairen (怀仁荣定王朱逊烠)
1461	Wang Huai (王淮)	Princess of Ansu county (安肃县主)	NN	
1461	Jiang Hao (江浩)	Princess of Lingshan county (灵山县主)	NN	
Zhu Junzhi, defender lieutenant (镇国中尉朱俊枝)
NN	X Sixian (X思贤)	Lady Zhu, clanswoman (宗女朱氏)	Lady Ren (任氏)	
NN	Ma Tengyun (马腾云)	Lady Zhu, clanswoman (宗女朱氏)	Lady Ren (任氏)	
NN	Qiao Zongwu (乔宗武)	Lady Zhu, clanswoman (宗女朱氏)	Lady Ren (任氏)	
NN	Dong Shiquan (董世全)	Lady Zhu, clanswoman (宗女朱氏)	Lady Ren (任氏)	
NN	Liu Guozheng (刘国正)	Lady Zhu, clanswoman (宗女朱氏)	Lady Ren (任氏)	
Zhu Chongzhen, bulwark lieutenant (辅国中尉朱充𦩗)
NN	Xu Sanjin (许三晋)	Lady Zhu, clanswoman (宗女朱氏)	Lady Zhao (赵氏)	

Prince of Shanyin
Year	Prince consort	Princess	Mother	References
Zhu Shifeng, Prince Duanyu of Shanyin (山阴端裕王朱仕堸)
1489	Xue Jixian (薛继贤)	Princess of Chengmai county (澄迈县主)	NN	
1494	Meng Jiru (孟继儒)	Princess of Ningxiang county (宁乡县主)	NN	
1490s	Yang Jizhe (杨继哲)	Princess of Shiquan county (石泉县主)	NN	
Zhu Chengjian, defender general (镇国将军朱成鉴)
1500s	Lu Zheng (路正)	Lady of Anxi commandery (安溪郡君)	NN	
1500s	Li Yongren (李永仁)	Lady of Shenze county (深泽郡君)	NN	
1500s	Zhang Yide (张益悳)	Lady of Enping commandery (恩平郡君)	NN	
1500s	Wang Wulun (王五伦)	Lady of Lezhi commandery (乐至郡君)	NN	
Zhu Chengmou, Prince Rongjing of Shanyin (山阴荣靖王朱成鍪)
NN	Zhang Rulin (张汝霖)	Princess of Yunxian county (郧县县主)	Lady Mu (穆氏)	
NN	Zhang Rujing (张汝靖)	Princess of Huolu county (获鹿县主)	Lady Zhang (张氏)	
NN	Zhang Mengru (张孟儒)	Princess of Yining county (义宁县主)	Lady Zhang (张氏)	
NN	Yang Yongzhi (杨永治)	Princess of Fushui county (富水县主)	Lady Zhang (张氏)	
NN	Yang Liangzhi (杨良知)	Princess of Xiaxian county (夏县县主)	Lady Zhang (张氏)	
NN	Guo Qian (郭乾)	Princess of Xiangyi county (襄邑)	Lady Zhang (张氏)	
Zhu Conghan, defender general (镇国将军朱聪汗) and others
NN	Si En (姒恩)	Lady of Guichuan commandery (妫川郡君)	NN	
NN	Zhang Ning (张宁)	Lady of Hongdu commandery (洪都郡君)	NN	

Prince of Xiangyuan

Prince consort	Princess	Mother	References
Zhu Chengling, bulwark general (辅国将军朱成铃)
Wang Tingkun (王廷焜)	Lady of Junxian county (浚县县君)	Lady Xing (刑氏)	
Wang He (王鹤)	Lady of Fengxian county (凤县县君)	Lady Xing (刑氏)	
Zhu Chengzhuo, defender general (镇国将军朱成鋜)
Nan Jiugong (南九贡)	Lady of Feicheng commandery (肥城郡君)	Lady Luo (罗氏)	
Zhu Congcong, bulwark general (辅国将军朱聪淙)
Fan Liangxian (范良宪)	Lady of Linquan village (临泉县君)	Lady Shi (史氏)	
Li Yuqing (李禹卿)	Lady of Lingchuan village (陵川县君)	Lady Shi (史氏)	
Zhu Congdian, state general (奉国将军朱聪淀)
Li Bangyan (李邦彦)	Lady of Yunzhuang village (云庄乡君)	Lady Fu (傅氏)	
Zhu Congdian, state general (奉国将军朱聪淀) and other
Jiang Lian (蒋濂)	Lady of Mingying county (茗盈乡君)	NN	
Ning Chongyi (宁崇义)	Lady of Yichuan village (宜川乡君)	NN	
Li Mu (李木)	Lady of Heshui village (合水乡君)	NN	

Prince of Xichuan
Year	Prince consort	Princess	Mother	References
Zhu Xunliu, Prince Yi'an of Xichuan (隰川懿安王朱逊熮)
1459	Zhang Zhen (张珍)	Princess of Xin'an county (新安县主)	Lady Yuan	
1459	Yuan Bin (袁彬)	Princess of Taiping county (太平县主)	Lady Yuan	
Zhu Juncong, defender lieutenant (镇国中尉朱俊欉/⿱藂木)
NN	Zhao Ji (赵楫)	Lady Zhu, clanswoman (宗女朱氏)	Lady Li (李氏)	
Zhu Shice, defender general (镇国将军朱仕𡍫)
1497	Li Cong (李丛)	Lady of Zexi commandery (绩溪郡君)	NN	
Zhu Chengbei, bulwark general (辅国将军朱成钡)
NN	Liang Zhi (梁植)	Lady of Shining county (始宁县君)	NN	
Zhu Congchan, state general (奉国将军朱聪灛)
NN	Song Zongshun (宋宗舜)	Lady of Jinxiang village (金乡乡君)	Lady Zhong (淑人钟氏)	
Zhu Junrou, defender lieutenant (镇国中尉朱俊葇) and others
NN	Li Gao (李皋)	Lady Zhu, clanswoman (宗女朱氏)	NN	
NN	Wang Zhichong (王之宠)	Lady Zhu, clanswoman (宗女朱氏)	NN	
NN	Wang Sigong (王思恭)	Lady Zhu, clanswoman (宗女朱氏)	NN	
NN	X JiX (X继X)	Lady Zhu, clanswoman (宗女朱氏)	NN	

Prince of Changhua

Year	Prince consort	Princess	Mother	References
Zhu Chenghuan, Prince Rongxi of Changhua (昌化荣僖王朱成锾)
1491	Qi Ming (祁铭)	Princess of Qujiang county (曲江县主)	Lady Chang (王妃畅氏)	
1495	Wei Cheng (魏澄)	Princess of county (县主)	Lady Chang (王妃畅氏)	
Zhu Junshan, state general (奉国将军朱俊𣓒)
NN	Zhou XZhi (周X之)	Lady Zhu, clanswoman (宗女朱氏)	Lady Feng (内助冯氏)	
NN	Sun Ji (孙继)	Lady Zhu, clanswoman (宗女朱氏)	Lady Feng (内助冯氏)	
NN	Chen Chaobi (陈朝弼)	Lady Zhu, clanswoman (宗女朱氏)	Lady Feng (内助冯氏)	
NN	Liu Weicheng (刘委成)	Lady Zhu, clanswoman (宗女朱氏)	Lady Feng (内助冯氏)	

Prince of Ningjin

Year	Prince consort	Princess	Mother	References
Zhu Chengtong, Prince Huaikang of Ningjin (宁津怀康王朱成鉖)
1490	Zhang Zan (张瓒)	Princess of Guiyi county (归义县主)	Lady Shi	

Prince of Lechang

Prince consort	Princess	Mother	References
Zhu Junbi, Prince Rongjian of Lechang (乐昌荣简王朱俊楅)
Gao X (高X)	Lady of Fengxiang commandery (凤翔郡君) → Princess of Fengxiang county (凤翔县主) → Lady of Fengxiang commandery (凤翔郡君)	NN	
Zhu Chongxun, Prince Wenjing of Lechang (乐昌温靖王朱充𤓂)
Li Rushi (李儒士)	Princess of Xinluo county (新罗县主)	Lady Ma, Princess Consort (马氏)	
Li Shangwen (李尚文)	Princess of Huigang county (恢冈县主)	Lady Ma, Princess Consort (马氏)	
Xue Jian (薛锏)	Princess of Zhijiang county (支江县主)	Lady Ma, Princess Consort (马氏)	
Zhao Gao (赵杲)	Princess of Yulin county (榆林县主)	Lady Ma, Princess Consort (马氏)	

==== Prince of Su ====
Year	Prince consort	Princess	Mother	References
Zhu Yang, Prince Zhuang of Su (肃庄王朱楧)
1417	Zhang Duan (张端)	Princess of Chongxin commandery (崇信郡主)	Lady Sun, Princess Consort	
Zhu Shanyan, Prince Kang of Su (肃康王朱赡焰)
1450	Gao Song (高嵩)	Princess of Huating commandery (华亭郡主)	Lady Chen, Princess Consort (王妃陈氏)	
Zhu Bishi, Prince An of Su (肃安王朱弼柿)
1570s	Ma Zhi (马氏/XX)	Lady of XX commandery (XX郡君)	Lady Liu, Princess Consort	

===== Cadet lines =====
Year	Prince consort	Princess	Mother	References
Zhu Bizhi, Prince Xixian of Kaihua (开化僖宪王朱弼枳)
1534	Li Hongkui (李鸿逵)	Lady of Jinchang commandery (晋昌郡君)	Lady Zhang (媵妾张氏)	

==== Prince of Liao ====
Year	Prince consort	Princess	Mother	References
Zhu Zhi, Prince Jian of Liao (辽简王朱植)
1428	Zhao Qing (赵庆)	Princess of Jiangling commandery (江陵郡主)	NN	
1433	Wang Xun (王训)	Princess of Jianghua commandery (江华郡主)	NN	
1433	Zhou Yingbi (周英璧)	Princess of Luxi commandery (泸溪郡主)	NN	
1433	Ma Wenda (马文达)	Princess of Zhushan commandery (竹山郡主)	NN	
1443	Zhang Jin (张琎)	Princess of Suining commandery (绥宁郡主)	NN	
1443	Jiang Jie (将杰)	Princess of Guidong commandery (桂东郡主)	NN	
Zhu Guixia (辽王朱贵烚)
1458	Li Jing (李景)	Lady of Ganhua village (感化乡君)	NN	
1458	Yang Gang (杨纲)	Princess of Ningfu commandery (宁福县主)	NN	
1458	Ye Zhen (叶珍)	Lady of Muyi village (慕义乡君)	NN	

===== Cadet lines =====
Prince of Songzi
Year	Prince consort	Princess	Mother	References
Zhu Guiheng, Prince Anhui of Songzi (松滋安惠王朱贵烆)
1455	Yuan Yong (袁镛)	Princess of Shangjin county (上津县主)	Lady Hu	
1455	Du Tong (杜通)	Princess of Linwu county (临武县主)	Lady Hu	
1455	Yang Bochuan (杨伯川)	Princess of Shaoyang county (邵阳县主)	Lady Hu	

Prince of Yiyang
Year	Prince consort	Princess	Mother	References
Zhu Guifu, Prince Anxi of Yiyang (益阳安僖王朱贵烰)
1456	Lin Guang (蔺广)	Princess of Shangxi county (上溪县主)	Lady Zheng	
State general Zhu Shuxing (奉国将军朱术垶)
NN	Zhao Mou (赵某)	Lady Zhu, clanswoman (宗女朱氏)	Lady Xia (夏氏)	

Prince of Zhijiang
Year	Prince consort	Princess	Mother	References
Zhu Guiyi, Prince Zhuanghui of Zhijiang (枝江庄惠王朱贵熠)
1462	Chen Jian (陈键)	Princess of Yuan'an county (远安县主)	Lady Feng	
Zhu Zhixi, Prince Duanyi of Zhijiang (枝江端懿王朱致樨)
1480s	Xu Mou (徐某)	Princess of Pingshu County (平舒县主)	Lady Liao (廖氏)	

Prince of Yuan'an (远安王)
Prince consort	Princess	Mother	References
Zhu Guixie, Prince of Yuan'an (远安王朱贵燮)
Wei Yu (魏玉)	Lady Zhu, clanswoman (宗女朱氏)	Lady Zheng (郑氏)	
Wu Jin (武缙)	Lady Zhu, clanswoman (宗女朱氏)	Lady Zheng (郑氏)	
Zhou Yuan (周远)	Lady Zhu, clanswoman (宗女朱氏)	Lady Zheng (郑氏)	

Prince of Yuanling
Year	Prince consort	Princess	Mother	References
Zhu Guiyu, Prince Gongxian of Yuanling (沅陵恭宪王朱贵燏)
1456	Lu Jian (陆鉴)	Princess of Dangyang county (当阳县主)	Lady Yuan	

=== Prince of Qing ===
==== Cadet lines ====
Prince of Anhua
Year	Prince Consort	Princess	Mother	References
Zhu Zhidong, Prince Huiyi of Anhua (安化惠懿王朱秩炵)
1451	Jiang Duan (蒋端)	Princess of Fugu county (府谷县主)	Lady Ni (倪氏)	
1451	Gong Lian (宫濂)	Princess of Fushi county (肤施县主)	Lady Ni (倪氏)	

Prince of Shouyang
Year	Prince Consort	Princess	Mother	References
Zhu Zishao, defender general (镇国将军朱鼒柖)
1530s	Huang Ze (黄泽)	Lady of Dingxi commandery (定西郡君)	Lady Zhong	
1530s	Li Lin (李麟)	Lady of Chenggu commandery (城固郡君)	Lady Zhong	

Prince of Fenglin
Prince Consort	Princess	Mother	References
Zhu Tailiang, bulwark general (辅国将军朱台凉)
Shao Zai (邵在)	Lady of Ziling county (紫陵县君)	Lady Ding (丁氏)	

Prince of Zhenning
Year	Prince Consort	Princess	Mother	References
Zhu Zhiying, Prince Zhuanghui of Zhenning (真宁庄惠王朱秩荧)
1451	Wan Bao (万珤)	Princess of Longxi county (陇西县主)	Lady Xin (辛氏)	

=== Prince of Ning ===
Year	Prince Consort	Princess	Mother	References
Zhu Quan, Prince Xian of Ning (宁献王朱权)
1428	Gao Heling (高鹤龄)	Princess of Yongxin commandery (永新郡主)	NN	
1428	Fang Jingxiang (方景祥)	Princess of Yushan commandery (玉山郡主)	NN	
1428	Chen Yi (陈逸)	Princess of Qingjiang commandery (清江郡主)	NN	
1428	Wang Shuang (王爽)	Princess of Fengxin commandery (奉新郡主)	NN	
1428	Han Fu (韩辅)	Princess of Jinxi commandery (金溪郡主)	NN	
1428	Wang Zhanran (汪湛然)	Princess of Taihe commandery (泰和郡主)	NN	
1428	Wang Zhi (王质)	Princess of Pengze commandery (彭泽郡主)	NN	
1428	Tian Yu (田昱)	Princess of Luling commandery (庐陵郡主)	NN	
1428	Hu Guangji (胡广霁)	Princess of Xinyu commandery (新喻郡主)	NN	
1428	Li Huan (李𤩽)	Princess of Xincheng commandery (新城郡主)	NN	
1428	Yu Zhiyuan (俞致渊)	Princess of Fuliang commandery (浮梁郡主)	NN	
1428	Zhang Wen (张雯)	Princess of Nanfeng commandery (南丰郡主)	NN	
1438	Meng Rijing (孟日敬)	Princess of Yongfeng commandery (永丰郡主)	NN	
Zhu Panshi, Prince Hui of Ning (宁惠王朱磐烒)
1451	Yan Jie (严杰)	Princess of Leping commandery (乐平郡主)	Lady Yu	
1453	Guo Qi ()	Princess of Gao'an county → Princess of Gao'an commandery (高安县主→高安郡主)	Lady Yu	
1453	Dai Ying (戴英)	Princess of Dexing commandery (德兴郡主)	Lady Yu	
Zhu Dianpei, Prince Jing of Ning (宁靖王朱奠培)
1480s	Kong Jingwen (孔景文)	Princess of Anfu commandery Zhu Guihua (安福郡主朱桂花)	Lady Xiao	
Zhu Jinjun, Prince Kang of Jing (宁康王朱觐钧)
1492	Li Tingyong (李廷用)	Princess of Jutan commandery (菊潭郡主)	Feng Zhen'er (冯针儿)	

=== Cadet lines ===
Prince of Linchuan
Year	Prince Consort	Princess	Mother	References
Zhu Panye, Prince Kangxi of Linchuan (临川康僖王朱磐烨)
1454	Zhang Jin (张晋)	Princess of Xingan county (新淦县主)	Lady Huang	
1454	Zhang Xiao (张效)	Princess of Pingxiang county (平乡县主)	Lady Huang	
1492	Ma Chun (马淳)	Lady Zhu, clanswoman (宗女朱氏)	Lady Wang	

Prince of Le'an
Prince Consort	Princess	Mother	References
Zhu Dianlei, Prince Zhaoding of Lean (乐安昭定王奠垒)
Wu Jin (吴谨)	Princess of Shangrao county (上饶县主)	Lady Song, Princess Consort (王妃宋氏)	
Chen Zhun (陈准)	Princess of Dayu county (大庾县主)	Lady Song, Princess Consort (王妃宋氏)	
Shen Yongtong (沈永通)	Princess of Shangyou county (上犹县主)	Lady Song, Princess Consort (王妃宋氏)	
Zhang Zi (章镃)	Princess of Nancheng county (南城县主)	Lady Chen (陈氏)	
Zhang Song (张嵩)	Princess of Funing county (福宁县主)	Lady Lu (陆氏)	
Xu Ganfeng (徐淦凤)	Princess of Futing county (扶亭县主)	Lady Qian (钱氏)	
Zhu Gongluo, Prince Duanjian of Le'an (乐安端简王朱拱椤), managing Ning Princedom (宁府总理)
Yang Biao (杨表)	Princess of Kuanglu county (匡庐县主)	Lady Jiang (王妃江氏)	

Prince of Yichun
Year	Prince Consort	Princess	Mother	References
Zhu Panyao, Prince Anjian of Yichun (宜春安简王朱磐烑)
1462	Gao Tai (高泰)	Princess of Wan'an county (万安县主)	Lady Liu (王妃刘氏)	
1462	Chen Yi (陈仪)	Princess of Ningdu county (宁都县主)	Lady Liu (王妃刘氏)	

Prince of Xinchang
Year	Prince Consort	Princess	Mother	References
Zhu Panzhu, Prince Anxi of Xinchang (新昌安僖王朱磐炷)
1462	Shen Mao (沈懋)	Princess of Nankang county (南康县主)	Lady Ge (王妃葛氏)	
1462	Zhong Yu (钟毓)	Princess of Yudu county (雩都县主)	Lady Ge (王妃葛氏)	

Prince of Ruichang
Prince Consort	Princess	Mother	References
Zhu DuoX, defender lieutenant (镇国中尉朱多X)
Wu Pengju (吴鹏举)	Lady Zhu, clanswoman (宗女朱氏)	NN	
Zhu Mouyuan, bulwark lieutenant
Yang Zhenbang (杨震邦)	Lady Zhu, clanswoman (宗女朱氏)	NN	
Yang Shi (杨氏)	Lady Zhu, clanswoman (宗女朱氏)	NN	

Prince of Yiyang
Year	Prince Consort	Princess	Mother	References
Zhu Dianlan, Prince Rongzhuang of Yiyang (弋阳荣庄王朱奠壏)
1470s	Xia Ying (夏瑛)	Princess of Jinxian county (进贤县主)	Lady Hu	
Zhu Chenrui, Prince Zhuangxi of Yiyang (弋阳庄僖王朱宸汭)
1540s	Kang Cen (康岑)	Princess of Jiayu county (嘉鱼县主)	Lady Qiu	

=== Prince of Han ===
Year	Prince Consort	Princess	Mother	References
Zhu Song, Prince Xian of Han (韩宪王朱松)
1417	Wang Rong (王荣)	Princess of Ronghe commandery (荣河郡主)	Feng Miaoqin (冯妙亲)	
Zhu Chongyu, Prince Gong of Han (韩恭王朱冲𤊨)
1438	Zhao Qing (赵庆)	Princess of Chunhua commandery (淳化郡主)	Lady Han	
1450	Hu Lun (胡纶)	Princess of Nanzheng commandery (南郑郡主)	Lady Han	

==== Cadet lines ====
Prince of Leping
Year	Prince Consort	Princess	Mother	References
Zhu Chongxiu, Prince Dingsu of Leping (乐平定肃王朱沖烋)
1456	Guo Xian (郭贤)	Princess of Xihe county (西河县主)	Lady Wang	
Zhu Fanchang, Prince Xi'an of Leping (乐平僖安王朱范场)
1470s	Wen Xianzong (文显宗)	Lady of Qin'an commandery (秦安郡君)	NN	

=== Prince of Shen ===
Year	Prince Consort	Princess	Mother	References
Zhu Mo, Prince Jian of Shen (沈简王朱模)
1428	Zhang Ru (张儒)	Princess of Hunyuan commandery (浑源郡主)	NN	
1428	Yuan Tong (袁通)	Princess of Yicheng commandery (翼城郡主)	NN	
1428	Tian Jie (田杰)	Princess of Hejin commandery (河津郡主)	NN	
1440	Zhou Gao (周镐)	Princess of Jiexiu commandery (介休郡主)	NN	
Zhu Jitun, Prince Kang of Shen (沈康王朱佶焞)
1456	Li Pan (李磐)	Princess of Changping commandery (长平郡主)	Lady Han	
Zhu Youxue, Prince Zhuang of Shen (沈庄王朱幼峃)
1510s	Zhang Deng (张澄)	Princess of Guangwu commandery (广武郡主)	Lady Zhao	
1510s	Liu Benhong (刘本洪)	Princess of Fuchuan commandery (富川郡主)	Lady Gao	
1510s	Cheng Xian (程贤)	Princess of Andong commandery (安东郡主)	Lady Gao	
1510s	Song Min (宋旻)	Princess of Yonghe commandery (永和郡主)	Lady Wang	

==== Cadet lines ====
Prince of Lingchuan
Year	Prince Consort	Princess	Mother	References
Zhu Jikui, Prince Kangsu of Lingchuan (陵川康肃王朱佶煃)
1447	Zhang Guan (张瓘)	Princess of Yuci county (榆次县主)	NN	
1447	Wang Guan (王瓘)	Princess of Linjin county (临晋县主)	NN	

Prince of Licheng
Year	Prince Consort	Princess	Mother	References
Zhu Jiju, Prince Zhaoxi of Licheng (黎城昭僖王朱佶燏)
1447	He Xu (何绪)	Princess of Zhengping county (正平县主)	Lady Chen (王妃陈氏)	
1447	Song An (宋安)	Princess of Shangdang county (上党县主)	Lady Chen (王妃陈氏)	
1447	Hu Lun (胡伦)	Princess of Huoqiu county (霍丘县主)	Lady Chen (王妃陈氏)	

Prince of Jishan
Year	Prince Consort	Princess	Mother	References
Zhu Jijuan, Prince Daojing of Jishan (积山悼靖王朱佶焆)
1451	Dou Gang (都纲)	Princess of Tongdi county (铜鞮县主)	Lady Yang (杨氏)	
1451	Yan Run (阎闰)	Princess of Shanyang county (鄯阳县主)	Lady Yang (杨氏)	

Prince of Qinyuan
Year	Prince Consort	Princess	Mother	References
Zhu Jifu, Prince Gongding of Qinyuan (沁源恭定王朱佶㷆)
1454	Zhang Guan (赵珍)	Princess of Feixiang county (肥乡县主)	Lady Huang ()	

Prince of Qingyuan
Year	Prince Consort	Princess	Mother	References
Zhu Youxu, Prince Zhuangjian of Qingyuan (清源庄简王朱幼㘧)
1478	Liu Yu (刘昱)	Princess of county (县主)	Lady Shen (申氏)	

Prince of Neiqiu
Year	Prince Consort	Princess	Mother	References
Zhu YouX, Prince Gongxi of Neiqiu (内丘恭僖王朱幼X)
1495	Hua Gui (花桂)	Princess of Pengze county (彭泽县主)	Lady Gong (龚)	

Prince of Yongnian
Prince Consort	Princess	Mother	References
Zhu Yougong, Prince Rong'an of Yongnian (沁源恭定王朱佶㷆)
Lian Duan (练端)	Princess of Junxian county (肥乡县主)	Lady Li ()	
Wu Zhou (吴洲)	Princess of Qingcheng county (清城县主)	Lady Li ()	
Niu X (牛X)	Princess of Xingning county (兴宁县主)	Lady Li ()	
Zhu Yinsu, Prince Gongyu of Yongnian (永年恭裕王朱胤橚)
Duan Jike (段继科)	Princess of Taigu county (太谷县主)	NN	
Zhu Quanjue, Prince Huaixi of Yongnian (永年怀僖王朱诠爵)
Wang Zhong (王钟)	Lady of Anning commandery (安宁郡君)	Lady Duan (段氏)	
Cheng Qian (程谦)	Lady of Xuancheng commandery (宣城郡君)	Lady Duan (段氏)	
Zhu Xun'ou, bulwark general (辅国将军朱勋沤) and other
Chen Qiao (陈桥)	Lady of Shanglong county (上隆县君)	NN	
Liu Kai (刘铠)	Lady of Quanjiao county (全椒县君)	NN	
Song Tengpeng (宋腾鹏)	Lady of Fenyuan county (汾源县君)	NN	
Chen Fu (陈富)	Lady of Hebei county (河北县君)	NN	
Miao Wei (苗纬)	Lady of Kunshan county (崑山县君)	NN	
Song Zhikui (宋之奎)	Lady of Tongling county (铜陵县君)	NN	
Cheng Erzhu (程二柱)	Lady of Shaxian county (沙县乡君)	NN	
Cui Ruji (崔汝楫)	Lady of Xiangshan county (象山县君)	NN	
Zhu Yinshi, state general (奉国将军朱胤栻) and others
Qu Chaohan (屈朝汉)	Lady of Pingzhang village (平漳乡君)	NN	
Feng Rubi (冯汝璧)	Lady of Yongyu village (雍榆乡君)	NN	
Zhu Quanguan, defender general (镇国将军朱诠瓘)
Li Yunwo (李云渥)	Lady of Xinye commandery (新耶郡君)	Lady Chen (陈氏)	
Wang Ji (王楫)	Lady of Zhanyi commandery (沾益郡君)	Lady Chen (陈氏)	
Zhang Wei (张惟)	Lady of Ganquan commandery (甘泉郡君)	Lady Chen (陈氏)	
Su Zhu (苏注)	Lady of Xiangcheng commandery (象城郡君)	Lady Chen (陈氏)	
Guo Xi (郭玺)	Lady of Pingshan commandery (平山郡君)	Lady Chen (陈氏)	
Zhu Yinwei, state general (奉国将军朱胤椲)
Ren Hongdao (任弘道)	Lady of Yidu village (宜都乡君)	Lady Li (李氏)	
Zhao Liqi (赵利器)	Lady of Hongshan village (洪善乡君)	Lady Li (李氏)	
Zhang Tongyuan (张同元)	Lady of Yuping village (玉屏乡君)	Lady Li (李氏)	
Zhu Tianzheng, defender lieutenant (镇国中尉朱恬炡)
Yuan Gui (原桂)	Lady Zhu, clanswoman (宗女朱氏)	Lady Song (宋氏)	

=== Prince of Tang ===
Year	Prince Consort	Princess	Mother	References
Zhu Jing, Prince Ding of Tang (唐定王朱桱)
1431	Zhang Xuan (张铉)	Princess of Henei commandery (河内郡主)	Lady Sun (孙氏)	
Zhu Qiongda, Prince Xian of Tang (唐宪王朱琼炟)
1460s	Zhang Feng (张凤)	Princess of Shangcai commandery (上蔡郡主)	Second Princess Consort, lady Jiao (继王妃焦氏)	
1460s	Chen Jie (陈玠)	Princess of Yuanqiu commandery (宛丘郡主)	Second Princess Consort, lady Jiao (继王妃焦氏)	
1478	Pang Min (庞珉)	Princess of Yinshui commandery (殷水郡主)	Second Princess Consort, lady Jiao (继王妃焦氏)	
Zhu Miqian, Prince Zhuang of Tang (唐庄王朱弥钳)
1500s	Li Jiang (李江)	Princess of Xihua county (西华县主)	Lady Yang (杨氏)	
1500s	Ni Qian (倪虔)	Princess of Luonan county (洛南县主)	Lady Yang (杨氏)	
1500s	Xiao Shao (箫韶)	Princess of Xinyang county (信阳县主)	Lady Yang (杨氏)	
Zhu Yuwen, Prince Jing of Tang (唐敬王朱宇温), Emperor Hui (南明惠皇帝)
1530s	Guo Heng (郭恒)	Princess of Jinhua commandery (金华郡主)	Lady Liu (刘氏)	
Zhu Yuze, defender general (镇国将军朱宇泽)
1520s	Chen Tianxu (陈天叙)	Lady of Xiayi commandery (夏邑郡君)	NN	

==== Cadet lines ====
Prince of Xinye
Year	Prince Consort	Princess	Mother	References
Zhu Zhizheng, defender general (镇国将军朱芝埩)
1500s	Zhang Mian (张勉)	Lady of Ningling county (宁陵县君)	Lady Chen (谌氏)	
Zhu Zhicheng, Prince Gongjian of Xinye (新野恭简王朱芝城)
1483	Lu Xuan (陆璇)	Princess of Commandery (县主)	Lady Xing (邢氏)	
1483	Cui Hong (崔纮)	Princess of Commandery (县主)	Lady Xing (邢氏)	
Zhu ZhouX, Prince Kangjing of Xinye (新野康靖王朱宙X)
1500s	Jin Tiren (金体仁)	Princess of Lingao county (临皋县主)	Lady Zhao (赵氏)	
Zhu QiX, defender general → state general (奉国将军朱器X)
NN	X Leshao (X乐韶)	Lady of Pengchi commandery (蓬池郡君)	NN	
NN	Guo Zongyun (郭宗云)	Lady of Guangchong commandery (广崇郡君)	NN	
NN	Cheng XX (程XX)	Lady of Yangxia commandery (阳夏郡君)	NN	

Prince of Weihui
Prince Consort	Princess	Mother	References
Zhu Michang, Prince Gongyi of Weihui (卫辉恭懿王朱弥鋿)
Liu Tong (刘同)	Princess of Ningguo county (宁国县主)	Lady Guo (郭氏)	
Dong Jing (董经)	Princess of Xianju county (仙居县主)	Lady Guo (郭氏)	
Ye Kun (叶鹍)	Princess of Wen'an county (文安县主)	Lady Guo (郭氏)	
Zhang Zhou (张昼)	Princess of Yongqing county (永清县主)	NN	

=== Prince of Yi ===
Year	Prince Consort	Princess	Mother	Issue	References
Zhu Mianzheng, Prince An of Yi (伊安王朱勉塣)
1489	Cai Sheng (蔡升)	Princess Jianzhen of Zhenqiu (真丘嘉贞郡主)	Lady Zhang, princess consort (王妃张氏)		
Zhu Dilüe, Prince Ding of Yi (伊定王朱𬤊锊)
1500s	Wang Liangchen (王良臣)	Princess of Fucheng commandery (阜城郡主)	Lady Shen, princess consort (王妃沈氏)		
1500s	Han Yingbi (韩应璧)	Princess of Chongyang commandery (崇阳郡主)	Lady Shen, princess consort (王妃沈氏)		
Zhu Xuchun, prince Jing of Yi (伊敬王朱訏淳)
1530s	Shi Lin (石麟)	Princess of Dengfeng commandery (登封郡主)	Lady Zhang (张氏)	1 daughter	
Zhu Dianyang, prince Ai of Yi (伊哀王朱典楧)
NN	Pan Zhen (潘溱)	Princess of Xianning commandery (咸宁郡主)	Lady Fang, princess consort (王妃方氏)		
NN	Guo Yigui (郭一桂)	Princess of Ji'an commandery (吉安郡主)	Lady Fang, princess consort (王妃方氏)		
NN	Wang Yingyuan (王应元)	Lady Zhu, commoner (庶人朱氏)	Lady Gao (高氏)		
NN	Zhong Qiying (钟奇英)	Lady Zhu, commoner (庶人朱氏)	Lady Gao (高氏)		

===== Cadet lines =====
Prince of Fangcheng
Prince Consort	Princess	Mother	References
Zhu Xulie, defender general (镇国将军朱𬣙洌 )
Cai Sizhong (蔡思忠)	Lady of Luyi commandery (鹿邑郡君)	Lady Zhao (夫人赵氏)	
Liu Shifu (刘世福)	Lady of Xinle commandery (新乐郡君)	Lady Zhao (夫人赵氏)	
Zhu Baojun, bulwark general (辅国将军朱褒焌)
Zhang Yin (张寅)	Lady of county (县君)	Lady Pan (夫人潘氏)	
Ye Chunxiao (叶春晓)	Lady of county (县君)	Lady Pan (夫人潘氏)	
Zhu Keyu, state general (奉国将军朱珂堣)
Li Rong (李镕)	Lady of village (乡君)	Lady Yu (淑人于氏)	

Prince of Wan'an
Prince Consort	Princess	Mother	References
Zhu Dianzhi, prince Kangyi of Wan'an (万安康懿王朱典𬃊)
Li Shen (李深)	Princess of Huai'en county (怀恩县主)	Lady Wang, princess consort (王妃王氏)	
Chang Shiyi (常士益)	Princess of Ancheng county (安城县主)	Lady Wang, princess consort (王妃王氏)	
Ye Shun (叶舜)	Princess of Ningde county (宁德县主)	Lady Zhang, second princess consort (王继妃)	
Jin Tianjue (金天爵)	Princess of Wuchang county (武昌县主)	Lady Zhang, second princess consort (王继妃)	
Zhou Dacheng (周大成)	Princess of Shangcai county (上蔡县主)	Lady Tang (汤氏)	

Prince of Anle
Prince Consort	Princess	Mother	References
Zhu Baojie, Prince of Anle (安乐王朱褒煯)
Li Sibian (李似楩)	Lady Zhu, clanswoman (宗女朱氏)	Lady Chen (陈氏)	
Yang Rongguang (杨容光)	Lady Zhu, clanswoman (宗女朱氏)	Lady Chen (陈氏)	
Zhao Congji (赵从吉)	Lady Zhu, clanswoman (宗女朱氏)	Lady Chen (陈氏)	

=== Sons of the Yongle Emperor ===
==== Prince of Zhao ====
Year	Prince Consort	Princess	Mother	References
Zhu Gaosui, Prince Jian of Zhao (赵简王朱高燧)
1438	Bu Hai (簿海)	Princess of Yancheng commandery (郾城郡主)	Lady Weng (翁氏)	

===== Cadet lines =====
====== Prince of Nanle (南乐王) ======
Year	Prince Consort	Princess	Mother	References
Zhu Jianqu, defender general (镇国将军朱见渠)
XVI century	Li Maize (李迈泽)	Lady of Linru commandery (临汝郡君)	Lady Lu (陆氏)	
XVI century	Cui Tang (崔镗)	Lady of Qingjian commandery (清涧郡君)	Lady Lu (陆氏)	
XVI century	Huang Xiang (黄相)	Lady of Shangjin commandery (上津郡君)	Lady Lu (陆氏)	
XVI century	Li Chaofu (李朝辅)	Lady of Yucheng commandery (虞城郡君)	Lady Lu (陆氏)	
XVI century	Huang Ding (黄锭)	Lady of Dongliu commandery (东流郡君)	Lady Lu (陆氏)	
XVI century	Zhang Cunren (张存仁)	Lady of Zhangqiu commandery (章丘郡君)	Lady Lu (陆氏)	
Zhu Houzao, defender general (镇国将军朱厚燥)
1590s	Sun Shangjin (孙尚进)	Lady of Ancheng commandery (安城郡君)	Lady Li (李氏)	

====== Prince of Tangyin (汤阴王) ======
Year	Prince Consort	Princess	Mother	References
Zhu Houxing, bulwark general (辅国将军朱厚煋)
XVI century	Zhang Guoben (张国本)	Lady of Yangxia county (阳夏县君)	Lady Li (李氏)	

=== Sons of the Hongxi Emperor ===
==== Prince of Zheng (郑王） ====
Prince Consort	Princess	Mother	References
Zhu Zaimi, Prince Jing of Zheng (郑敬王朱载𤦀)
Liu Yijiao (刘一蛟)	Princess of Yutai commandery (邘邰郡主)	Lady Guan, princess consort (王妃关氏)	

===== Cadet lines =====
Prince of Fanchang (繁昌王)
Prince Consort	Princess	Mother	References
Zhu Jianqin, Prince Gongding of Fanchang (繁昌恭定王朱见𰝠)
Ji Pang (姬滂)	Princess of Zhecheng county (柘成县主)	Lady Du, princess consort (王妃杜氏)	

==== Prince of Xiang (襄王） ====
Prince Consort	Princess	Mother	References
Zhu Zhanshan, Prince Xian of Xiang (襄宪王朱瞻墡)
Liu Long (刘隆)	Princess of Xiangzhang commandery (湘漳郡主)	Lady Jing (王妃靖氏)	
Zhu Houying, Prince Zhuang of Xiang (襄庄王朱厚颖)
He Cijin (何赐进)	Princess of Yongning commandery (永宁郡主)	Lady Zhang (张氏)	

===== Cadet lines =====
Prince of Zhenning (镇宁王)
Prince Consort	Princess	Mother	References
Zhu Youke, defender general (镇国将军朱祐柯)
Li Tingwei (李廷伟)	Lady of Jiaxing commandery (嘉兴郡君)	Lady Fu (傅氏)	
Wang Yiyu (王一豫)	Lady of Linjiang commandery (临江郡君)	Lady Fu (傅氏)	

==== Prince of Jing (荆王） ====
===== Cadet lines =====
Prince of Fanshan (樊山王)
Prince Consort	Princess	Mother	References
Zhu Yichi, Prince of Fanshan (樊山王朱翊𨥌)
Li Shicheng (李世乘)	Lady Zhu, clanswoman (宗女朱氏)	Lady Liu (刘氏)	
Liu Yunning (刘允宁)	Lady Zhu, clanswoman (宗女朱氏)	Lady Liu (刘氏)	
Chen Jibi (陈及弼)	Lady Zhu, clanswoman (宗女朱氏)	Lady Liu (刘氏)	
Jin Tiansu (金天宿)	Lady Zhu, clanswoman (宗女朱氏)	Lady Liu (刘氏)	
Fu Ruoqi (傅若契)	Lady Zhu, clanswoman (宗女朱氏)	Lady Liu (刘氏)	

==== Prince of Zhun (准王) ====
Year	Prince Consort	Princess	Mother	References
Zhu Zhan'ao, Prince Jing of Zhun (准靖王朱瞻墺)
1452	Mo Yu (莫愚)	Princess of Guixi commandery (贵溪郡主)	Lady Xiao, princess consort (王妃萧氏)	
1452	Zhang Peng (张鹏)	Princess of Raogan commandery (馀干郡主)	Lady Xiao, princess consort (王妃萧氏)	
1453	Zhang Ding (张定)	Princess of Yihuang commandery (宜黄郡主)	Lady Xiao, princess consort (王妃萧氏)	
Zhu Youkui, Prince Zhuang of Zhun (准庄王朱祐楑)
1520s	Lü Huan (吕焕)	Princess of Nancheng commandery (南城郡主)	NN	

===== Cadet lines =====
Prince of Yongfeng (永丰王)
Prince Consort	Princess	Mother	References
Zhu Zaizhi, Elder Prince of Yongfeng (永丰长子朱载址)
Zhang Yingzhong (张应钟)	Lady of Nanbing commandery (南屏郡君)	Lady Chen (陈氏)	
Guan Wenhui (关文辉)	Lady of Songjiang commandery (淞江郡君)	Lady Chen (陈氏)	
Yang Zuhui (杨祖慧)	Lady Zhu, clanswoman (宗女朱氏)	Lady Li (李氏)	

Prince of Dexing (德兴王)
Year	Prince Consort	Princess	Mother	References
Zhu HouX, Prince Duanshun of Dexing (德兴端顺王朱厚X)
1574	Pan Wen'an (潘文黯)	Princess of Heshui county (合水县主)	Princess Consort, Lady Li (王妃李氏)	

Prince of Guangxin (广信王)
Year	Prince Consort	Princess	Mother	References
Zhu Houqi, Prince Gongshun of Guangxin (广信恭顺王朱厚火其)
1574	Hu Shilu (胡氏禄)	Princess of Shiping county (始平县主)	Lady He (何氏)	

=== Sons of the Emperor Yingzong of Ming ===
==== Prince of Ji ====
Prince Consort	Princess	Mother	References
Zhu Jianjun, Prince Jian of Ji (吉简王朱见浚)
Shi Ce (史策)	Princess of Shanhua commandery (善化郡主)	Lady Zhang (张氏)	

==== Prince of Hui (徽王) ====
===== Cadet lines =====
Prince of Jiading (嘉定王)
Prince Consort	Princess	Mother	References
Zhu Zaiduo, Prince Gongshun of Jiading (嘉定恭顺王朱载㙐)
Wu Zongwu (吴宗武)	Princess of Yichuan county (义川县主)	Lady Gao (高氏)	
Liu Tingzan (刘廷赞)	Princess of Shiquan county (石泉县主)	Lady Gao (高氏)	

=== Sons of the Chenghua Emperor ===
==== Prince of Xing ====
Prince of Xing
Year	Prince Consort	Princess	Mother	Issue	References
Zhu Youyuan, Prince of Xing (兴王朱祐杬), Emperor Xian (献皇帝)
5 September 1523	Wu Jinghe (邬景和)	Princess Yongfu (永福公主)	Empress Cixiaoxian, lady Jiang (慈孝献皇后蒋氏)		
23 September 1527	Xie Zhao (谢诏)	Princess Yongchun (永淳公主)	Empress Cixiaoxian, lady Jiang (慈孝献皇后蒋氏)	Son: Xie Shoupu (谢守朴)	

==== Prince of Yi (益王) ====
Prince Consort	Princess	Mother	References
Zhu Youbing, Prince Duan of Yi (益端王朱祐槟)
Li Xi (李熙)	Princess of Anfu Commandery (安福郡主)	Lady Peng (彭氏)	
Zhu Youmu, Prince Ding of Yi (益定王朱祐木)
Zuo Shiji (左世及)	Zhu Zhenlin, Princess of Yongfu commandery (永福郡主朱振麟)	Lady Huang (黄氏)	
Jin Hui (金暳)	Zhu Zhenxiang, Princess of Yongkang commandery (永康郡主朱振祥)	Lady Huang (黄氏)	
Nie Jiwen (聂继文)	Zhu Zhenrui, Princess of Anyuan commandery (安远郡主朱振瑞)	Lady Huang (黄氏)	

===== Cadet lines =====
Prince of Chunhe (淳河王)
Prince Consort	Princess	Mother	References
Zhu Changrui, Prince Huaixi of Chunhe (淳河怀僖王朱常汭)
Xia Zuoyin (夏祚殷)	Zhu Yanshou, Princess of Shicheng county (石城县主朱衍寿)	Lady Jiang (江氏)	
Zhu Youshi, Prince Huaixi of Chunhe (淳河王朱由栻)
Luo Mou (罗某)	Lady Zhu, clanswoman (宗女朱氏)	Lady Jiang (江氏)	
Zhang Tongfeng (张桐凤)	Lady Zhu, clanswoman (宗女朱氏)	Lady Jiang (江氏)	
Xia Jiugui (夏九桂)	Lady Zhu, clanswoman (宗女朱氏)	Lady Jiang (江氏)	

==== Prince of Heng ====
===== Cadet lines =====
Prince of Gaotang (高唐王)
Prince Consort	Princess	Mother	References
Zhu Houying, Prince Duanyu of Gaotang (高唐端裕王朱厚煐)
Wang Weijun (王维俊)	Princess of Huangpu county (黄浦县主)	Princess Consort, Lady Li (李氏)	
Wang Deyao (王登要)	Princess of Changqing county (长清县主)	Princess Consort, Lady Li (李氏)	

Prince of Hanyang (汉阳王)
Prince Consort	Princess	Mother	References
Zhu HouX, Prince Wenhui of Hanyang (汉阳温惠王朱厚X)
Xu Cunming (许存名)	Princess of Zichuan county (淄川县主)	Princess Consort, Lady Fu (傅氏)	
Liu Shaoji (刘绍纪)	Lady Zhu (朱氏)	Lady Wang (王氏)	

==== Prince of Ru ====
Prince Consort	Princess	Mother	References
Zhu Youpeng, Prince An of Ru (福忠王朱祐梈)
Ma Ruyang (马汝扬)	Princess of Lingshou commandery (灵寿郡主)	NN	
Li Lan (李兰)	Princess of Xinxiang commandery (新乡郡主	NN	

=== Sons of the Wanli Emperor ===
==== Prince of Fu ====
Prince Consort	Princess	Mother	References
Zhu Changxun, Prince Zhong of Fu (福忠王朱常洵), Emperor Xiao (孝皇帝)
Zhang Ersheng (张尔昇)	Princess of commandery (郡主)	NN	

==== Prince of Gui ====
Prince Consort	Princess	Mother	References
Zhu Changying, Prince Duan of Gui (桂端王朱常瀛), Emperor Duan (端皇帝)
Huang Xing (黄垶)	Princess of Guangde (广德公主)	NN	
