= Empress Wang (Wanli) =

Empress of China from 1572 to 1620

Empress Xiaoduanxian 孝端顯皇后
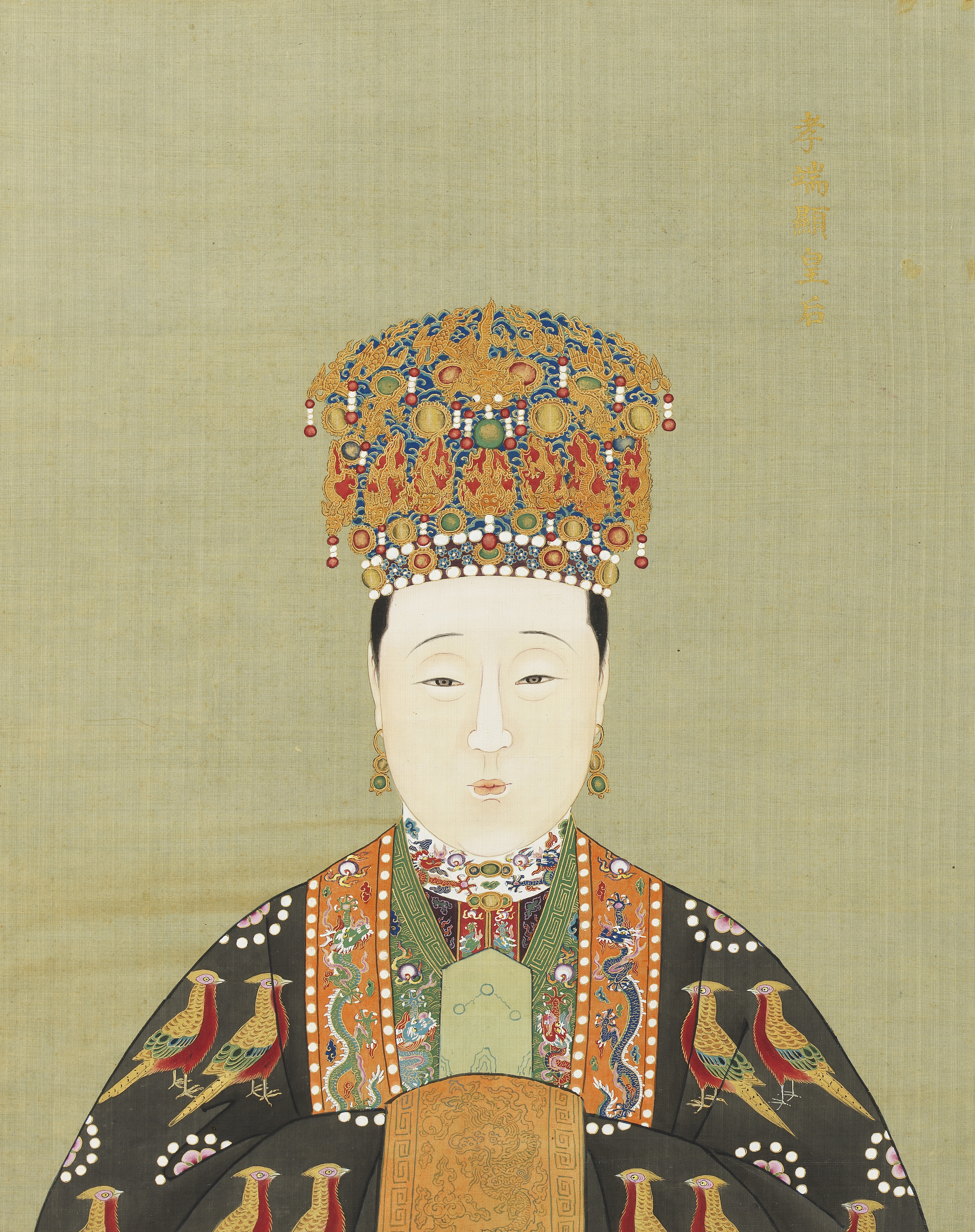

Empress consort of the Ming dynasty
- Tenure: 19 July 1578 –7 May 1620
- Predecessor: Empress Xiao'an
- Successor: Empress Xiao'aizhe
- Born: 7 November 1564; Jingshi
- Died: 7 May 1620 (aged 55); Forbidden City, Jingshi
- Burial: Ding Mausoleum
- Spouse: Wanli Emperor (m. 1578)
- Issue: Princess Rongchang
Names
- Wang Xijie (王喜姐)
Posthumous name
- Empress Xiàoduān Zhēnkè Zhuānghuì Rénmíng Pìtiān Yùshèng Xiǎn (孝端贞恪庄惠仁明媲天毓圣显皇后)
- Clan: Wang (王)
- Father: Wang Wei, Count of Yongnian (永年伯 王偉)

Empress Xiaoduanxian (Chinese: 孝端顯皇后; 7 November 1564 – 7 May 1620), personal name Wang Xijie (Chinese: 王喜姐), was empress consort of the Wanli Emperor. She was the longest serving empress consort in Chinese history.

== Early life ==
Wang was born in Beijing to Wang Wei (王偉) of Yuyao, Zhejiang.

In the first month of 1577, Empress Dowager Rensheng and Empress Dowager Xiaoding held a selection event to choose an empress for the Wanli Emperor. The 12-year old Wang Xijie entered the selection process and was successfully chosen to be the empress. In the first month of 1578, she was formally married to the Wanli Emperor at the age of 13. The grand secretary Zhang Juzheng wrote to both empress dowagers, arguing that Wang Xijie and the Wanli Emperor were too young.

Initially, Wang's father was made a member of the Jinyiwei with authority over 1,000 households as a result of his daughter's success. In 1579, the Wanli Emperor also conferred the rank of Count (伯) of Yongnian on him. Since the time of the Jiajing Emperor, inheritance of a feudal title by lineal descendants was not permitted. To show favour to Wang Xijie, her brother Wang Dong (王棟) was granted the countship on their father's death. When Wang Dong died, his mother Lady Zhao (趙) begged the emperor to extend the countship to Wang Dong's children, which was promptly done. Only the family of Empress Dowager Xiaoding had previously received similar honours.

== Empress ==
The History of Ming records that the empress was extremely solemn and her filial piety made her a favourite of her mother-in-law Empress Dowager Xiaoding. During the period when the succession was undecided, the emperor's eldest son by Lady Gong was attacked at his palace in the east of the imperial city. Empress Xiaoduanxian organised for more guards and protections to be installed at his residence.

The historian Ray Huang comments:

"She was, from her wedding day, permanently encased in palatial pomp and comfort; yet, by cruel exigency of tradition, her marriage was only a state necessity, reducing her to an accessory to an institution, entitled to all kind of meaningless honors but to little satisfaction as a wife. She bore the emperor a daughter and lived almost as long as he did. But at no time did she in any way affect the course of his life. As the principal daughter-in-law to jen-sheng, the emperor's principal mother, she had both the privilege and the obligation of attending her in public, such as helping her from her sedan chair, a task Hsiao-tuan performed exactly as required, thus earning for herself a reputation for filial piety. Inside the palace, however, she was better remembered as a ruthless mistress who frequently ordered her chambermaids beaten, sometimes to death."

Empress Xiaoduanxian had one daughter in 1582 named Zhu Xuanying, formally titled the Princess Rongchang, who married a military commander named Yang Chunyuan (楊春元).

== Titles ==
- During the reign of the Jiajing Emperor (r. 1521–1567):
  - Lady Wang (王氏; from 7 November 1564)
- During the reign of the Wanli Emperor (r. 1572–1620):
  - Empress (皇后; from 1578)
  - Empress Xiàoduān Zhēnkè Zhuānghuì Rénmíng Pìtiān Yùshèng Xiǎn (孝端贞恪庄惠仁明媲天毓圣显皇后; from 1620)

== Issue ==
- As empress:
  - Princess Rongchang (榮昌公主; 1582–1647), personal name Xuanying (軒媖), the Wanli Emperor first daughter
    - Married Yang Chunyuan (楊春元; 1582–1616) in 1597, and had issue (five sons)

== Tomb ==
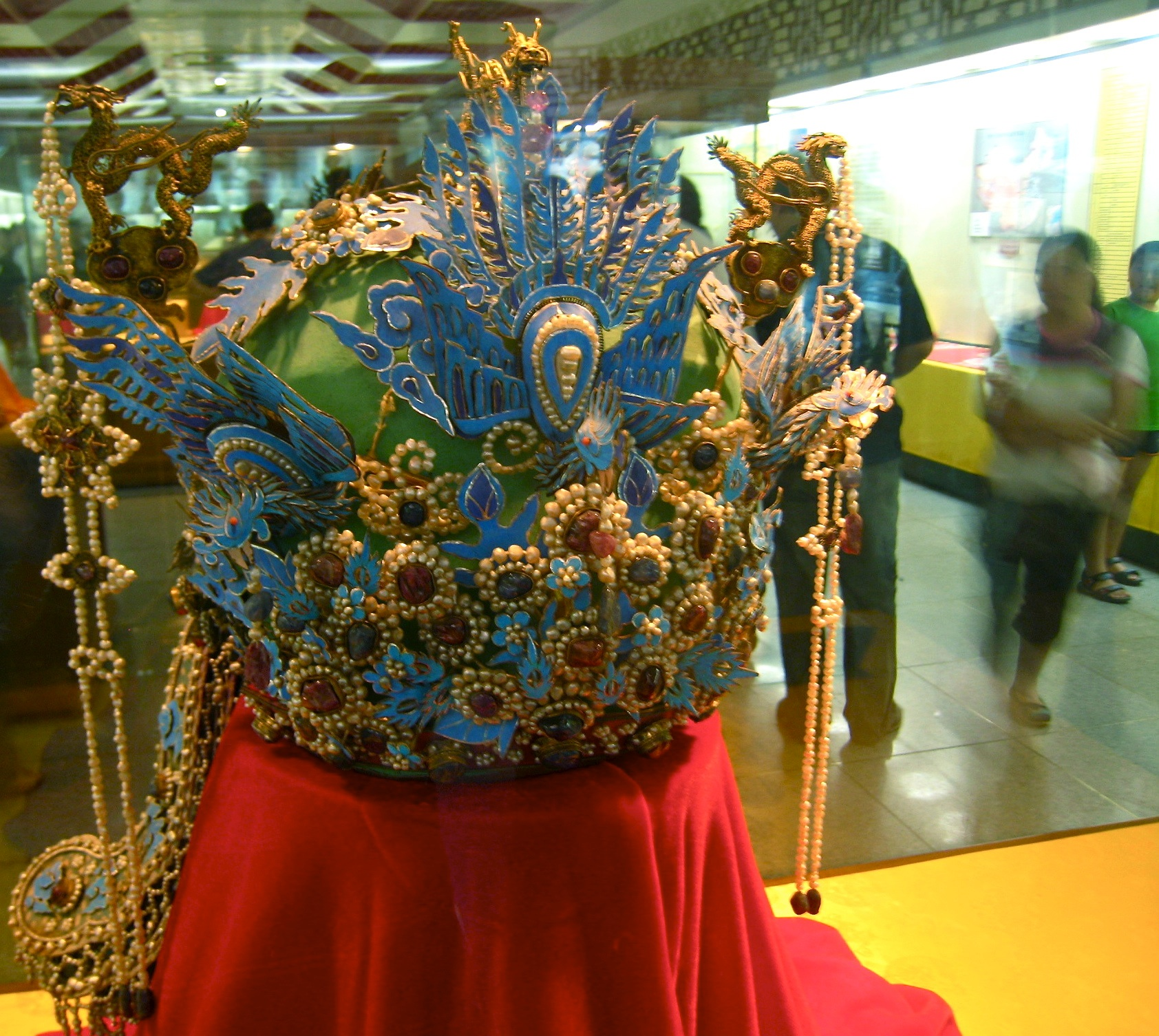
Phoenix crown of Empress Xiaoduanxian

The empress was buried at Dingling, where her husband was later interred.

During the excavation of Dingling in 1956, many treasures from Empress Xiaoduanxian's burial were unearthed. These included her phoenix crown, which the empress would have worn when visiting and making sacrifices in the ancestral temple. The crown features three phoenixes, six dragons, and weighs 2.96 kg. It now forms part of the collections of the National Museum of China.

== Gallery ==
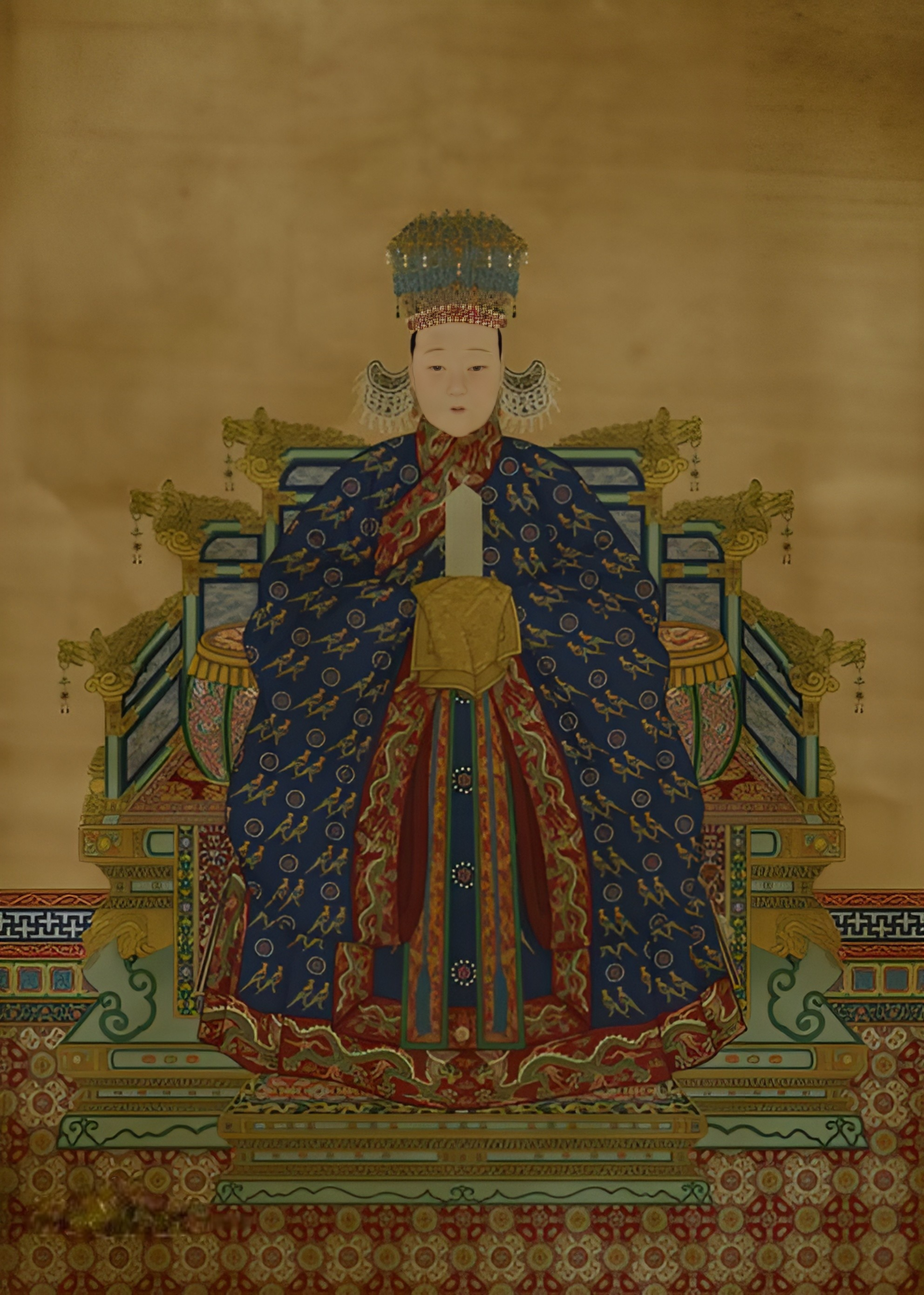
In ceremonial dress

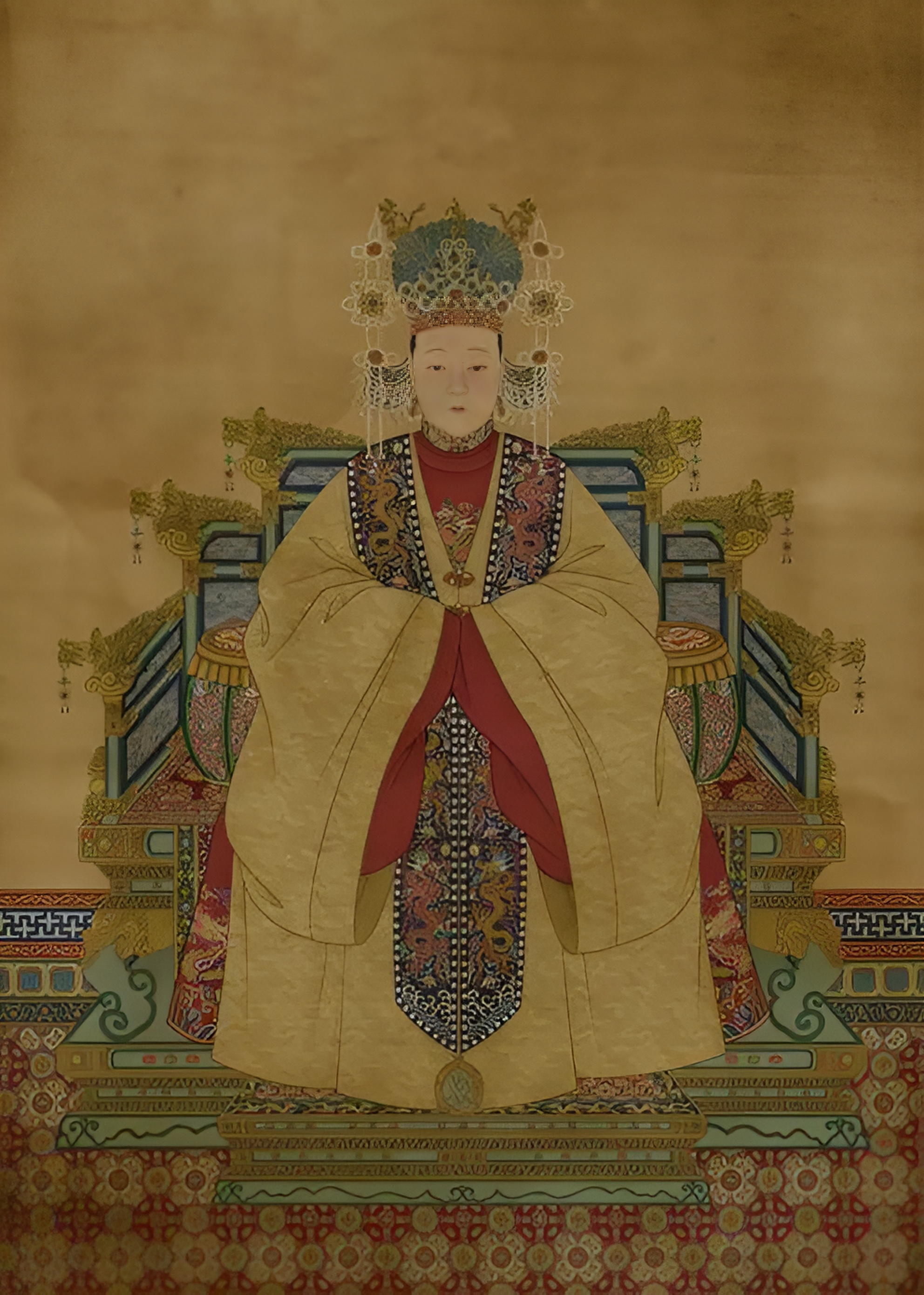
In court dress

== Sources ==
- "Shining pearls at the National Museum". China Daily. 2 October 2016.
- Huang, Ray (1981). 1587, a Year of No Significance. New Haven: Yale University Press. ISBN 978-0-300-02518-7.
- Qian Fang 錢枋, ed. (1700). "《萬曆野獲編》第五卷 勛戚" [Compilation of spaces conquered by Wanli]. open-lit (in Chinese). Open-lit. Archived from the original on 11 February 2017.
- Zhang Tingyu, ed. (1739). "《明史》卷一百十四 列传第二" [History of Ming, Volume 114, Historical Biography 2]. Lishichunqiu Net (in Chinese). Lishi Chunqiu.
- Zhongyang yanjiuyuan lishi yuyan yanjiusuo xiao 中央研究院歷史語言研究所校, ed. (1962). 明實錄：明神宗實錄 [Veritable Records of the Ming: Veritable Records of Shenzong of Ming] (in Chinese). Taipei: Zhongyang yanjiuyuan lishi yuyan yanjiusuo.

Chinese royalty
Preceded by Empress Xiao'an	Empress consort of China; 1578–1620	Succeeded by Empress Xiaoaizhe
