= Princess Rongchang =

Ming dynasty princess (1582–1647)

Princess Rongchang 榮昌公主
- Born: June 1582; Beijing
- Died: 1647 (aged 64–65)
- Spouse: Yang Chunyuan (楊春元)
- Issue: Yang Guangkui (楊光夔); Yang Guanggao (楊光皋); Yang Guangdan (楊光旦); Yang Guangyi (楊光益); Yang Guanglong (楊光龙)
Names
- Zhu Xuanying (朱軒媖)
- House: Zhu
- Father: Wanli Emperor
- Mother: Empress Xiaoduanxian

Princess Rongchang (1582–1647) was a Chinese princess, the eldest child of the Ming dynasty Wanli Emperor and the only child of Empress Xiaoduanxian.

== Biography ==
In 1596, Zhu Xuanying was given the title of Princess Rongchang. In May of the same year, she married Yang Chunyuan, for which Yang was granted a command by the Wanli Emperor. Their first son Guangkui was born in 1600.

Princess Rongchang's family remained closely connected to the imperial house, as shown by the appointment in 1608 of her eldest son to the Jinyiwei. In addition, the Ming Shilu note that she attended court to participate in ceremonies and rituals alongside her siblings, Princess Shouning, the King of Gui, and the King of Rui, right up until 1620.

In May 1621, Princess Rongchang's nephew, the Tianqi Emperor, conferred honours upon his paternal aunts and uncles. Princess Rongchang was given the title Princess Supreme Rongchang (Chinese: 大長公主榮昌; pinyin: Dàzhǎng gōngzhǔ róngchāng).

== Husband's penalisation ==
In 1604, Princess Rongchang quarrelled with her husband. The Wanli Emperor was angered on his daughter's behalf and issued an imperial edict, scolding his son-in-law. In response, Yang abandoned his command and travelled in a small, two-person litter back to the town of his parents in modern-day Gu'an County. Incensed, the Wanli Emperor expelled Yang's father from office and sent members of the Jinyiwei to bring Yang back to Beijing, with the intention of compelling Yang to fulfil his duty as husband to Princess Rongchang. Before he was caught, however, Yang returned voluntarily to the capital and professed repentance. As punishment, Yang was sent to the Guozijian to be lectured on propriety for 100 days. Only after he had studied diligently was his father's official position to be restored.

Yang Chunyuan's mother died in January 1606, after which Yang demonstrated filial piety by grieving and refusing to eat. He died after seven days of this, leaving Princess Rongchang a widow with five sons.

== Later life ==
On 24 April 1644, a rebellion led by Li Zicheng captured Beijing and the emperor committed suicide. In the ensuing attempts by Li's forces to purge the Ming dynasty, four of Princess Rongchang's children were killed. On 5 June, Qing forces entered Beijing. Princess Rongchang attempted to provide the Qing with food, but by this point the tenant farmers on her lands were refusing to give up their crops. All of Princess Rongchang's property was given over to the military and she was sent to her husband's hometown in Gu'an County, reportedly with her only surviving son and 13 grandchildren.

In 1644, the Shunzhi Emperor of the Qing dynasty bestowed favours on Princess Rongchang, which included appointing two of her grandsons, Yang Qingyu (楊慶餘) and Yang Qiyu (楊旗餘), to the Jinyiwei. Both were children of Princess Rongchang's fourth son, Guangyi.

She died in 1647, the last of the Wanli Emperor's children.
