= List of consorts and children of the Wanli Emperor =

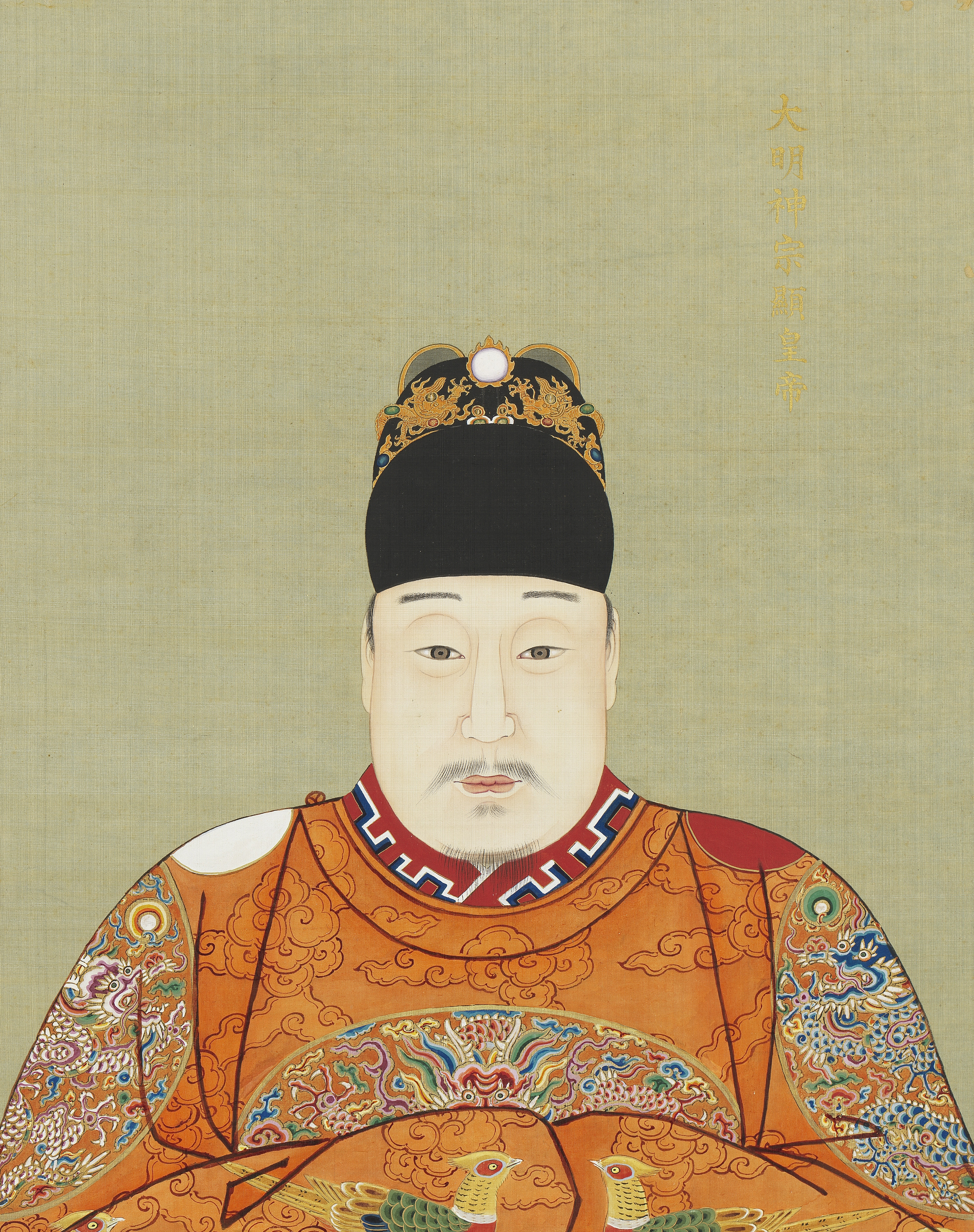
The Wanli Emperor in his middle age

The Wanli Emperor, the 14th emperor of the Ming dynasty of China, had 18 children, eight sons and ten daughters, by eight women. Of these, five sons and two daughters lived to adulthood. The most important women in his life were his mother, Empress Dowager Li, (Note: After the Wanli Emperor ascended the throne, she served as regent during his minority in accordance with tradition, although real power remained in the hands of Senior Grand Secretary Zhang Juzheng. Empress Dowager Li formed a ruling alliance with the influential eunuch Feng Bao and retained her influence even after Zhang's death. She also formed alliances with the grand secretaries Shen Shixing, Xu Guo (許國), and Wang Xijue. She was a devout Buddhist and made large donations to Buddhist monks and monasteries.) and his favorite concubine, Lady Zheng. Other prominent women included Empress Wang and Lady Wang, the mother of his eldest son. The Emperor also had numerous other consorts of various ranks.

In 1578, the Wanli Emperor married 13-year-old Wang Xijie and made her empress. Like his mother, she was of commoner origin. Empress Wang had one daughter and no sons. She maintained a dignified public image and showed respect toward Empress Dowager Li. She supported the Emperor's eldest son in the succession struggle over Lady Zheng's son, but she was known for her strictness and cruelty within the imperial palace, causing fear among those who served her. The Empress died in 1620, shortly before the Wanli Emperor's own death.

Lady Wang was a servant in the Empress Dowager's palace. In late 1581, during one of his visits to his mother, the Emperor took notice of the young Lady Wang, who soon became pregnant with his child. Although the Wanli Emperor initially wanted nothing to do with the child, his mother convinced him to acknowledge paternity by providing records of his visits. In August 1582, Lady Wang gave birth to the Emperor's first son, Zhu Changluo. Two years later, the Emperor's concubine Lady Zheng gave birth to a daughter, Zhu Xuanshu, and quickly gained the Emperor's favor and trust, causing his interest in Lady Wang to diminish. Lady Wang lived in seclusion in the Forbidden City, and the Emperor neglected her. It was not until 1606, after the birth of Zhu Changluo's first son (the later Tianqi Emperor), that she was granted the title of "Imperial Noble Consort" (Huang Guifei), which was appropriate for the mother of an heir. Empress Dowager Li supported Zhu Changluo's position as heir apparent during the succession dispute with Zhu Changxun, Lady Zheng's son. When the Emperor objected that his eldest son was born to a mere palace servant, she replied that the Emperor himself was also the son of a mere servant. Lady Wang died in 1611.

Lady Zheng was chosen to join the Emperor's harem in 1582, and soon after her arrival, she captured his attention and love. In 1586, after giving birth to Zhu Changxun, she was promoted to the position of "Imperial Noble Consort", which was just one step below that of empress. She and the Emperor had a total of six children, but their desire to name Zhu Changxun as the successor instead of the eldest son, Zhu Changluo, caused a political crisis. Despite the Emperor's efforts, he was unable to overcome the strong opposition of his ministers and officials, and the decision was postponed for almost two decades. (Note: In theory, Ming emperors held ultimate authority over all officials and generals, and the entire country was expected to obey their decrees. However, emperors were not expected to make major decisions concerning the direction of the state entirely on their own. Major issues were typically discussed at official audiences or informal meetings, and broad consensus among court dignitaries was often sought before significant decisions were made.) It was not until 1601 that he finally appointed Zhu Changluo as heir to the throne. In 1615, Lady Zheng was suspected of involvement in the attempted assassination of Zhu Changluo in the "case of the attack with the stick", although these allegations were based on rumor and were never proven. Zhu Changluo fell ill shortly after taking the throne as the Taichang Emperor and died after just one month of reign. Once again, it was rumored that Lady Zheng was responsible for his death, but there was no concrete evidence to support these accusations. She died in 1630.

== List ==
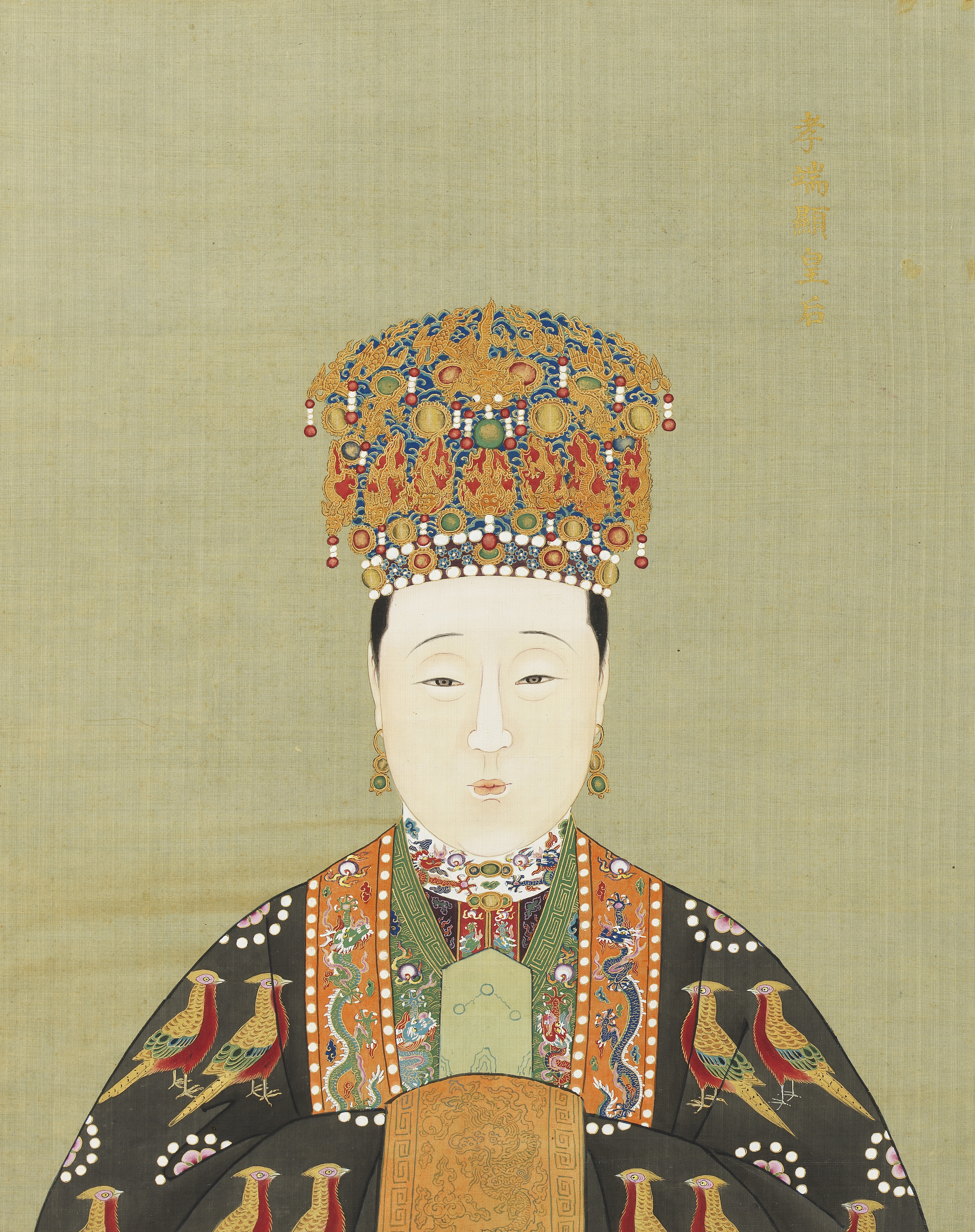
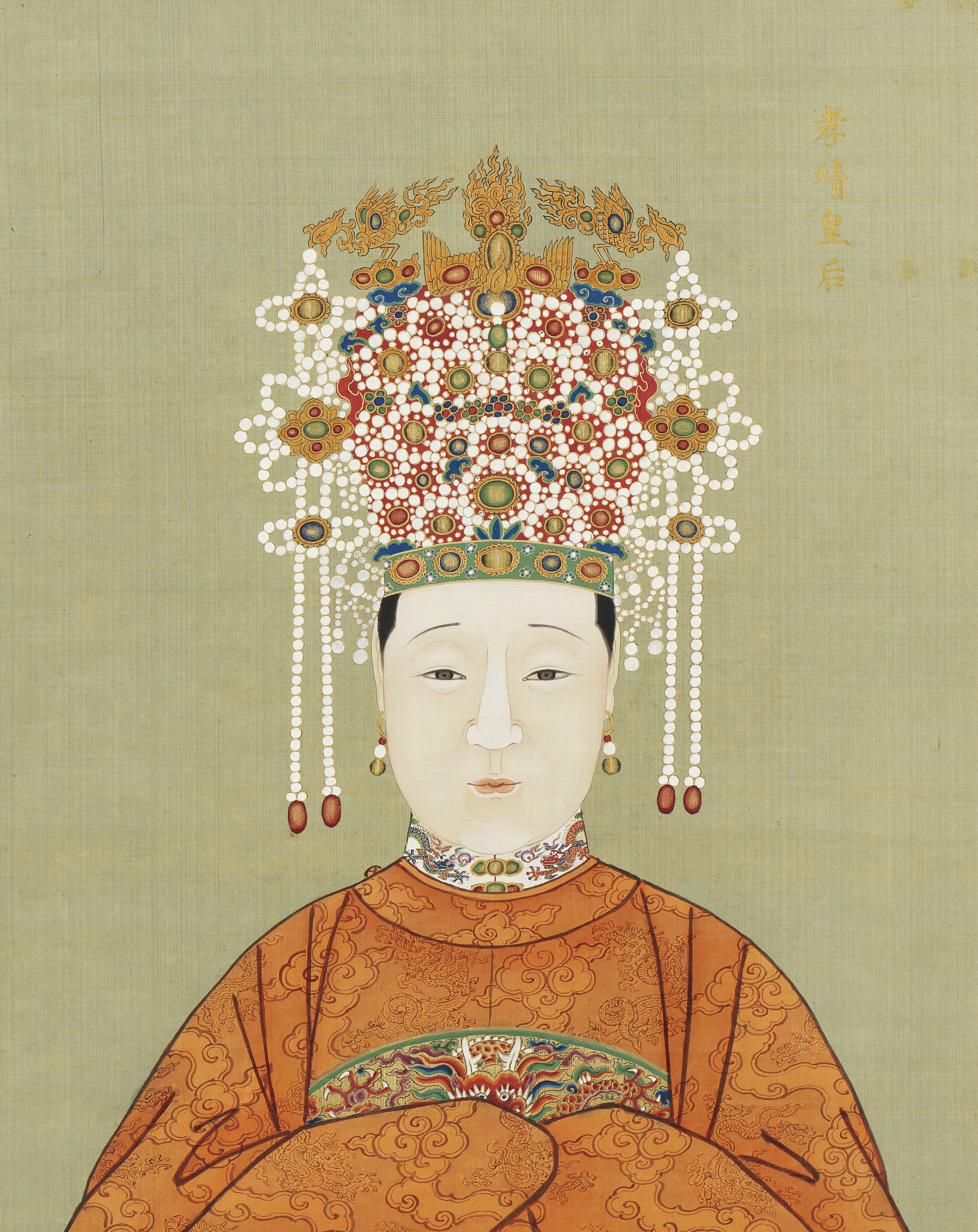
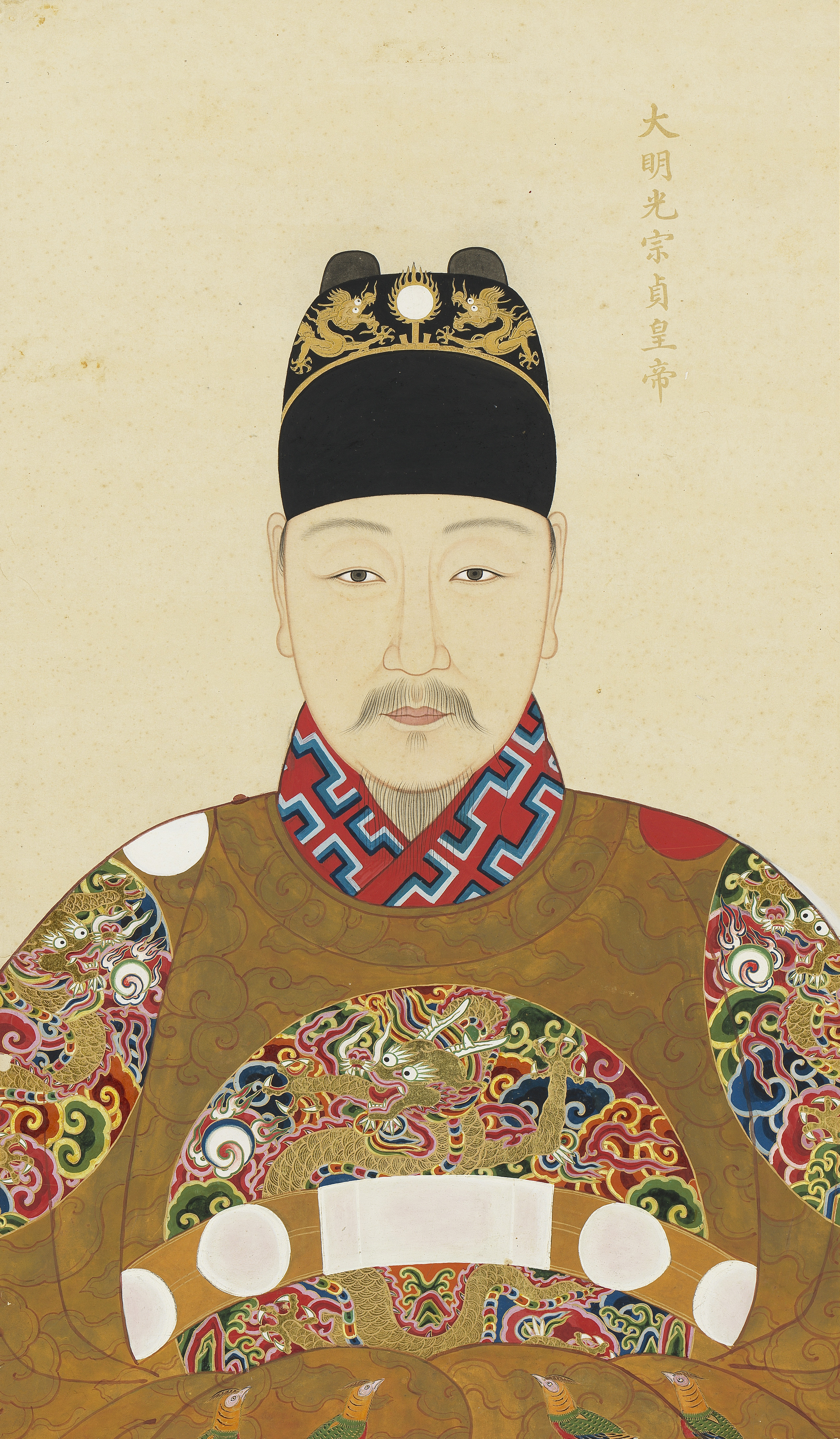
From left to right: Empress Wang, the Wanli Emperor's primary consort; Lady Wang, the mother of the Taichang Emperor; and the Taichang Emperor, the Wanli Emperor's eldest son and successor

Consorts and children of the Wanli Emperor
Consorts	Children (Note: Children of the Wanli Emperor by his respective consorts, with birth order indicated)
Empress Xiaoduanxian (孝端顯皇后) of the Wang clan (王氏; 1564–1620), personal name Xijie (喜姐)	Zhu Xuanying (朱軒媖), Princess Rongchang (榮昌公主), first daughter. Married in 1596 to Yang Chunyuan (楊春元; d. 1616).
Empress Xiaojing (孝靖皇后) of the Wang clan (王氏; 1565–1611)	Zhu Changluo (朱常洛), the Taichang Emperor (泰昌帝; 1582–1620; r. 1620), first son
Empress Xiaojing (孝靖皇后) of the Wang clan (王氏; 1565–1611)	Zhu Xuanyuan (朱軒嫄), Princess Yunmeng (雲夢公主), fourth daughter
Imperial Noble Consort Gongkehuiyonghejing (恭恪惠榮和靖皇貴妃) of the Zheng clan (鄭氏; 1565–1630)	Zhu Xuanshu (朱軒姝), Princess Yunhe (雲和公主), second daughter
Imperial Noble Consort Gongkehuiyonghejing (恭恪惠榮和靖皇貴妃) of the Zheng clan (鄭氏; 1565–1630)	Zhu Changxu (朱常溆), Prince Ai of Bin (邠哀王), second son
Imperial Noble Consort Gongkehuiyonghejing (恭恪惠榮和靖皇貴妃) of the Zheng clan (鄭氏; 1565–1630)	Zhu Changxun (朱常洵), Prince Zhong of Fu (福忠王; 1586–1641), third son
Imperial Noble Consort Gongkehuiyonghejing (恭恪惠榮和靖皇貴妃) of the Zheng clan (鄭氏; 1565–1630)	Zhu Changzhi (朱常治), Prince Huai of Yuan (沅懷王), fourth son
Imperial Noble Consort Gongkehuiyonghejing (恭恪惠榮和靖皇貴妃) of the Zheng clan (鄭氏; 1565–1630)	Zhu Xuanyao (朱軒姚), Princess Lingqiu (靈丘公主), sixth daughter
Imperial Noble Consort Gongkehuiyonghejing (恭恪惠榮和靖皇貴妃) of the Zheng clan (鄭氏; 1565–1630)	Zhu Xuanwei (朱軒媁), Princess Shouning (壽寧公主; 1592–1634), seventh daughter. Married in 1599 to Ran Xingrang (冉興讓; d. 1644).
Imperial Noble Consort Gongshunyongzhuangduanjing (恭順榮莊端靜皇貴妃) of the Li clan (李氏; d. 1597)	Zhu Changrun (朱常潤), Prince of Hui (惠王; 1594–1646), sixth son
Imperial Noble Consort Gongshunyongzhuangduanjing (恭順榮莊端靜皇貴妃) of the Li clan (李氏; d. 1597)	Zhu Changying (朱常瀛), Prince Duan of Gui (桂端王; 1597–1645), seventh son
Consort Zhao (昭妃) of the Liu clan (劉氏; 1561–1644)	—N/a
Consort Ronghuiyi (榮惠宜妃) of the Yang clan (楊氏; d. 1580)	—N/a
Consort Wenjingshun (溫靜順妃) of the Chang clan (常氏; d. 1594)	—N/a
Consort Duanjingrong (端靖榮妃) of the Wang clan (王氏; d. 1591)	Zhu Xuangui (朱軒媯), Princess Jingle (靜樂公主), third daughter
Consort Zhuangjingde (莊靖德妃) of the Xu clan (許氏; d. 1602)	—N/a
Consort Duan (端妃) of the Zhou clan (周氏)	Zhu Changhao (朱常浩), Prince of Rui (瑞王; 1591–1644), fifth son
Consort Qinghuishun (清惠順妃) of the Li clan (李氏; d. 1623)	Zhu Changpu (朱常溥), Prince Si of Yong (永思王), eighth son
Consort Qinghuishun (清惠順妃) of the Li clan (李氏; d. 1623)	Zhu Xuanmei (朱軒媺), Princess Tiantai (天台公主), tenth daughter
Consort Xi (僖妃) of the Wang clan (王氏; d. 1589)	—N/a
Concubine De (德嬪) of the Li clan (李氏; 1576–1628)	Zhu Xuanji (朱軒姞), Princess Xianju (仙居公主), fifth daughter
Concubine De (德嬪) of the Li clan (李氏; 1576–1628)	Zhu Xuanji (朱軒姬), Princess Taishun (泰順公主), eighth daughter
Concubine De (德嬪) of the Li clan (李氏; 1576–1628)	Zhu Xuandeng (朱軒嬁), Princess Xiangshan (香山公主), ninth daughter
Concubine Shen (慎嬪) of the Wei clan (魏氏; 1567–1606)	—N/a
Concubine Jing (敬嬪) of the Shao clan (邵氏; d. 1606)	—N/a
Concubine Shun (順嬪) of the Zhang clan (張氏; d. 1589)	—N/a
Concubine He (和嬪) of the Liang clan (梁氏; 1562–1643)	—N/a
Concubine Dao (悼嬪) of the Geng clan (耿氏; 1569–1589)	—N/a
Concubine Rong (榮嬪) of the Li clan (李氏; 1568–1626)	—N/a
