= Li Sancai =

Li Sancai (Chinese: 李三才; Wade–Giles: Li San-ts'ai; courtesy name Daofu 道甫; art name Xiuwu 修吾; d. 1623) was an official during the late Ming dynasty in China. Li Sancai is best remembered for his outspoken opinions against the Wanli Emperor (r.1572-1620) regarding his eunuch-led mining policy in 1596; because of this, Li was a prominent figure in the political divide of the late Ming Dynasty.

== Early career ==
Li graduated jinshi in 1574 and began his career at the Ministry of Revenue. While working at the Ministry of Revenue Li came into contact with future founder of the Donglin party Gu Xiancheng. Due to his affiliation with Gu Xiancheng, Li was demoted and transferred to the provinces as Director Grain Transport in 1599. However, it wasn't until the 1600s, when Li opposed a eunuch sent to open mines and levy taxes in his region under Wanli's mine tax policy that he was seen as a potential champion for the Donglin party. The reason Li's actions galvanized the Donglin faction was because Wanli's eunuch mine commissioner policy represented a real threat to the Confucian class way of life. The wealthy gentry families saw the eunuchs sudden increase in power, at the expense of their own, as a direct act of aggression against them from the throne.

== Remonstrance ==
Over the following years, Li addressed a series of letters to the emperor detailing the horrendous acts that the mining commissioners had committed and how these unpunished crimes reflected poorly on the throne's ability to maintain order in the state. Li Sancai introduces one of his most famous remonstrance's by posing a question towards the throne asking how Wanli could let people commit these crimes in his name: "Where do things stand now? Not only do You not give them clothes to wear, You take their clothing as Your property; not only do You not give them enough to eat, You take their food as Your property." :

[Let Your Majesty] think about it a moment in the calm in the night and in the comfort of His palace: can His wise heart stand [such things], or is it impossible? Stay in peace, or is it impossible? Your servant knows that He cannot tolerate it, that He cannot remain in peace. There are the desires of one man, but there are also those of the multitude [of his subjects]. Your Majesty loves pearls and jade but the people equally love to be warm and well fed. Your Majesty loves [the idea that his descendants will succeed him for] ten thousand generations, but the people are equally attached to their wives and children. How can Your Majesty wish for His gold to pile up to the Pole Star yet prevent the people from keeping in reserve a single bushel of chaff? How can He want to assure His children and grandchildren a future of a thousand and ten thousand years yet prevent the people from foreseeing in the morning what will happen in the evening? Read the documents of the past: has the court ever issued such directives, the Empire ever presented such a sight, without there being rebellion?

== Differences between Li Sancai and The Donglin Faction ==
While Li and the Donglin both came together over their opposition towards Wanli's tax policy, they differed slightly in why they opposed it. Li objected to the policy on a pragmatic level, even admitting in the beginning that the state had an obligation to defend its interests in Korea and thus had a right to enact additional taxes on the people in order to pay for the war. In contrast to this many of Li's supporters viewed the Donglin opposition primarily as a philosophical movement. Li's pragmatic and empathetic attitude, which allowed him to see the situation from the state's point of view, is important because much of the criticism directed against Wanli's mine tax policy was from a purely philosophical stance that did not leave room for any other perspectives. Even though Li was strong willed and opinionated few other Donglin remonstrators would admit that the state had a legitimate taxing the people the way it did.
