= Wanli Emperor =

Emperor of China from 1572 to 1620

Wanli Emperor 萬曆帝
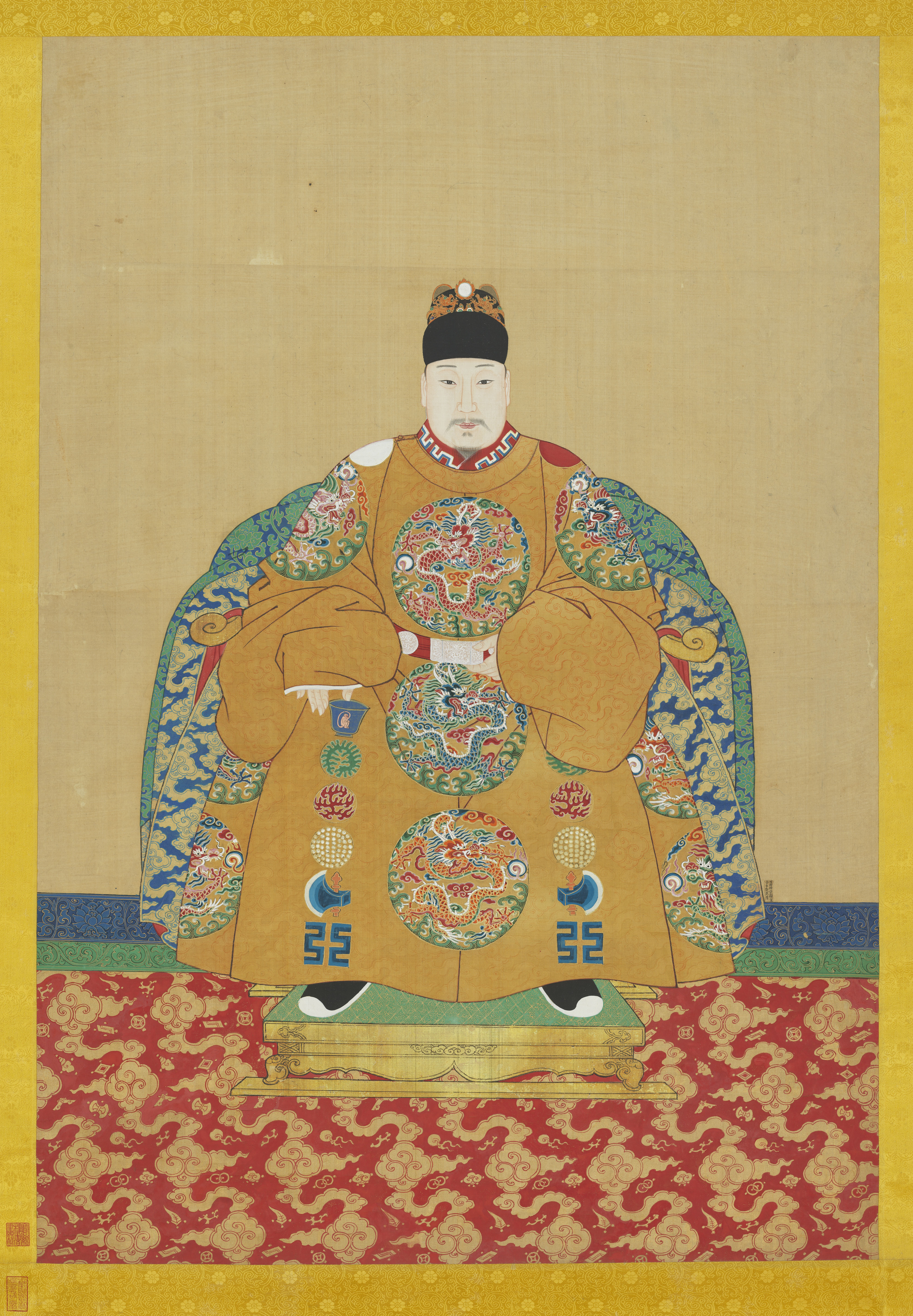
- Palace portrait on a hanging scroll

Emperor of the Ming dynasty
- Reign: 5 July 1572 – 18 August 1620
- Enthronement: 19 July 1572
- Predecessor: Longqing Emperor
- Successor: Taichang Emperor
- Born: 4 September 1563; Shuntian Prefecture, Beizhili
- Died: 18 August 1620 (aged 56); Hongde Hall, Forbidden City
- Burial: Ding Mausoleum, Ming tombs, Beijing
- Consorts: Empress Xiaoduanxian (m. 1578; died 1620) Empress Xiaojing (m. 1582; died 1611)
- Issue Detail: Taichang Emperor; Zhu Changxun, Prince of Fu; Zhu Changying, Prince Duan of Gui; Princess Shouning
Era dates
- Wanli: (Note: Simplified Chinese: 万历; traditional Chinese: 萬曆; pinyin: Wànlì) 2 February 1573 – 27 August 1620
Posthumous name
- Emperor Fantian Hedao Zhesu Dunjian Guangwen Zhangwu Anren Zhixiao Xian (Note: Simplified Chinese: 范天合道哲肃敦简光文章武安仁止孝显皇帝; traditional Chinese: 範天合道哲肅敦簡光文章武安仁止孝顯皇帝 (conferred by the Taichang Emperor in 1620))
Temple name
- Shenzong (Note: Chinese: 神宗; pinyin: Shénzōng)
- House: Zhu
- Dynasty: Ming
- Father: Longqing Emperor
- Mother: Lady Li
- Religion: Buddhism

Chinese name
- Traditional Chinese: 萬曆帝
- Simplified Chinese: 万历帝
Transcriptions
Standard Mandarin
- Hanyu Pinyin: Wànlì Dì
- Wade–Giles: Wan^{4}-li^{4} Ti^{4}
- IPA: [wân.lî tî]

The Wanli Emperor (4 September 1563 – 18 August 1620), personal name Zhu Yijun, (Note: Simplified Chinese: 朱翊钧; traditional Chinese: 朱翊鈞; pinyin: Zhū Yìjūn) (Note: Art name: Yuzhai (Simplified Chinese: 禹斋; traditional Chinese: 禹齋; pinyin: Yǔzhāi)) was the 14th emperor of the Ming dynasty of China, reigning from 1572 to 1620. He succeeded his father, the Longqing Emperor.

The Wanli Emperor ascended the throne at the age of nine. During the first ten years of his reign, Grand Secretary Zhang Juzheng effectively led the government, while the Emperor's mother, Lady Li, and the eunuch Feng Bao also played significant roles. The country experienced economic and military prosperity, reaching a level of power not seen since the early 15th century. The Emperor held great respect and appreciation for Zhang Juzheng, but as time passed, various factions within the government openly opposed Zhang, and the Emperor started to consider his influential position a burden. After Zhang died in 1582, the Emperor made significant changes to his administrative arrangements.

Ming China saw three major campaigns in the last decade of the 16th century. A Ming force of 40,000 soldiers had quelled a large rebellion in Ningxia by October 1592, allowing the Ming to shift their focus to Korea. Concurrently, Japan invaded Korea, leading to a joint Korean-Chinese force, including 40,000 Ming soldiers, pushing the Japanese out of most of Korea and forcing them to retreat to the southeast coast by 1593. In 1597, a second Japanese invasion was thwarted, and the suppression of the Yang Yinglong rebellion in southwest China concluded in a few months from 1599 due to Ming forces concentrating there amidst the ongoing war with Japan. In the final years of the Wanli era, the Jurchens grew stronger on the northeastern frontiers and posed a significant threat. In 1619, they defeated the Ming armies in the Battle of Sarhu and captured part of Liaodong.

Over time, the Emperor grew increasingly disillusioned with the constant demoralizing attacks and counterattacks from officials, causing him to become increasingly isolated. In the 1580s and 1590s, he attempted to promote his third son, Zhu Changxun, as heir to the throne, but many officials supported his eldest son, Zhu Changluo. This led to ongoing conflicts between the Emperor and his ministers for over fifteen years. Eventually, the Emperor appointed Zhu Changluo as heir in 1601, and Zhu Changluo later succeeded his father as the Taichang Emperor in 1620. In 1596, the Wanli Emperor attempted to establish a parallel administration composed of eunuchs, separate from the officials who had traditionally governed the empire, but this effort was abandoned in 1606. The governance of the country remained in the hands of Confucian intellectuals, who were often embroiled in disputes with each other. The opposition Donglin movement continued to criticize the Emperor and his followers, while pro-government officials were divided based on their regional origins.

== Early childhood ==
Zhu Yijun, the future Wanli Emperor, was born on 4 September 1563 during the reign of his grandfather, the Jiajing Emperor, who ruled China's Ming dynasty from 1521 to 1567. His father, Zhu Zaiji, was the heir to the throne, and his mother, Lady Li, was one of Zhu Zaiji's concubines. He had two older brothers, both of whom died in early childhood before 1563, and a younger brother, Zhu Yiliu (朱翊鏐; 1568–1614), who was made Prince of Lu in 1571. Zhu Zaiji ascended the throne as the Longqing Emperor in 1567, and designated Zhu Yijun as his heir in 1568. On 5 July 1572, the Longqing Emperor died at the age of 35, and Zhu Yijun succeeded his father two weeks later on 19 July 1572. He adopted the era name Wanli, which means "ten thousand years (of rule)".

== Early reign: Zhang Juzheng's leadership (1572–1582) ==
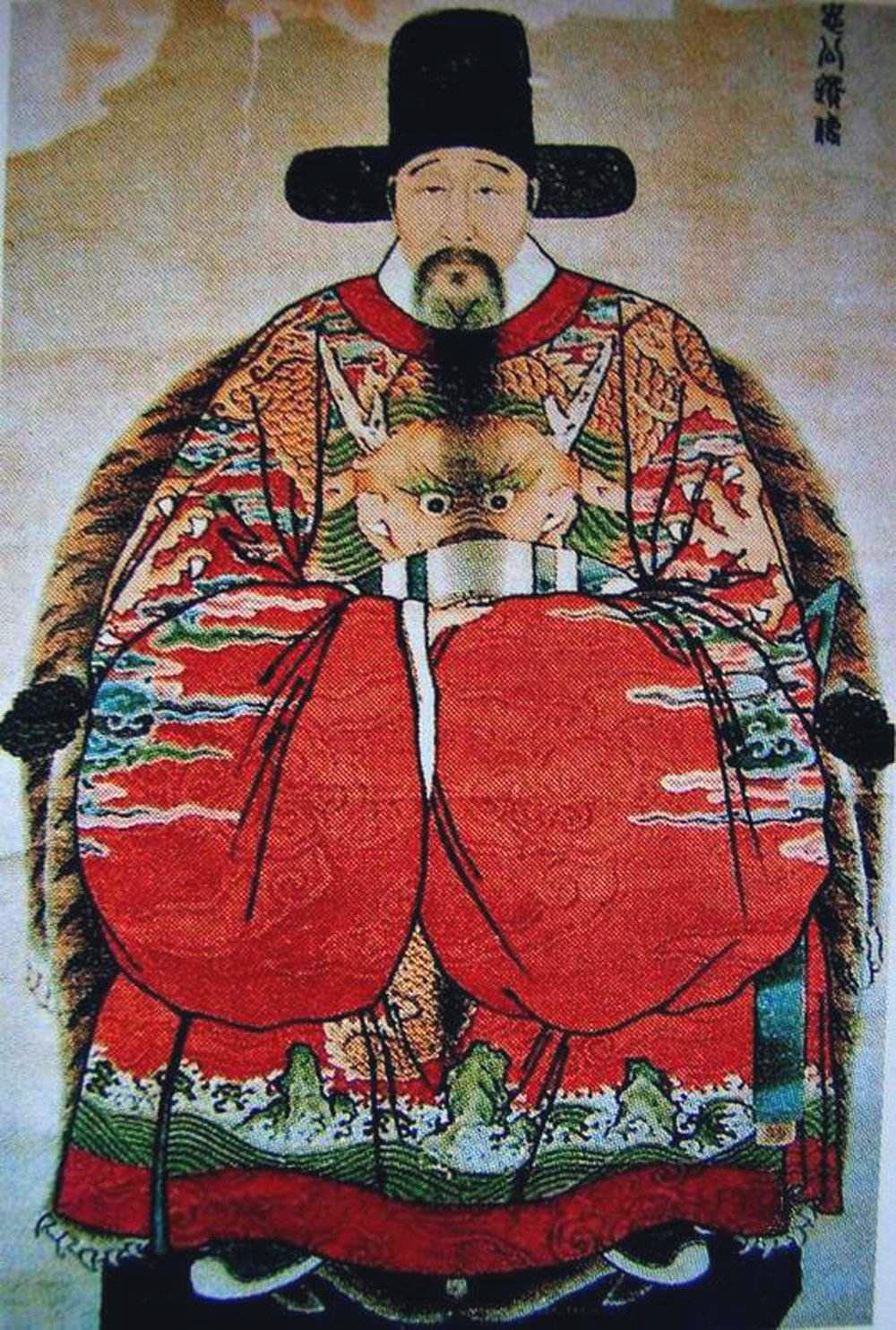
Portrait of Zhang Juzheng

At the end of the Longqing Emperor's reign, the government was led by Senior Grand Secretary Gao Gong. Shortly after the Wanli Emperor's accession, an alliance between the influential eunuch Feng Bao and Grand Secretary Zhang Juzheng succeeded in removing Gao. Zhang replaced Gao and remained in power until his death in 1582. Seeking to "enrich the country and strengthen the army", (Note: "Enrich the country and strengthen the army", or in Chinese, Fuguo qiang bing (富國強兵), is a phrase from the Zhan Guo Ce that summarizes the (legalist) policy of Shang Yang.) Zhang promoted Legalist rather than Confucian policies. He centralized government, expanded imperial authority at the expense of local interests, streamlined administration, and strengthened the military. His reforms included closing local academies and placing investigating censors under the Grand Secretariat's control. The Empress Dowager served as regent, and she and Feng Bao supported Zhang. Zhang selected his colleagues in the Grand Secretariat and extended informal influence over the Ministry of Rites and the Censorate through loyal appointments in central and regional offices. Although he lacked formal authority to issue orders, this arrangement gave him considerable power. He also redirected censors from personal vendettas toward tax collection and suppressing banditry. The efficiency of Ming administration improved markedly between 1572 and 1582, reaching a level seen only in the dynasty's early years.

Zhang implemented a series of reforms, including the conversion of tax payments from goods to silver (the single whip reform), changes to the old military field system, and revisions to county accounts on corvée labor, fees, and surcharges between 1572 and 1579. A new cadastre was compiled from 1580 to 1582, and these reforms were formalized empire-wide through revised lists of taxpayers' obligations, unified into payments in silver. As part of the administrative reforms, unnecessary activities were abolished or limited, state support for Confucian students was reduced, and provincial authorities were instructed to require only one-third of the former corvée labor. Postal services were also curtailed. Despite these measures, tax rates remained unchanged and arrears were strictly enforced, enabling Zhang to generate a surplus of income over expenditure. This was a notable achievement, as the Ming state usually lacked financial reserves in the 16th century. Improved savings and tax collection produced substantial reserves: by 1582, granaries around the capital held nine years' worth of grain; the Taicang treasury (太倉庫) contained 6 million liang (about 223 tons) of silver; the Court of the Imperial Stud (太僕寺) held another 4 million; and 2.5 million was stored in Nanjing. Smaller reserves also existed in Sichuan, Zhejiang, and Guangxi. Despite these successes, Zhang introduced no institutional innovations, instead improving existing procedures under the slogan of restoring the order of the early Ming period.

As a proponent of peace with the Mongols, Zhang rejected the proposal of Minister of War Tan Lun for a pre-emptive strike against them. Instead, he ordered Qi Jiguang, commander of the northeastern border, to maintain an armed peace. This decision not only allowed for a reduction in the border army, but also resulted in the return of surplus soldiers to their family farms. Zhang rejected the notion that military affairs were less important than civilian ones, and challenged the dominance of civilian dignitaries over military leaders. He appointed capable military leaders such as Qi Jiguang, Wang Chonggu (王崇古), Tan Lun, Liang Menglong (梁夢龍), and Li Chengliang to positions of responsibility. Additionally, he implemented a combination of defensive and offensive measures to strengthen border defenses and fostered peaceful relations with neighboring countries by opening border markets, particularly in the northwest.

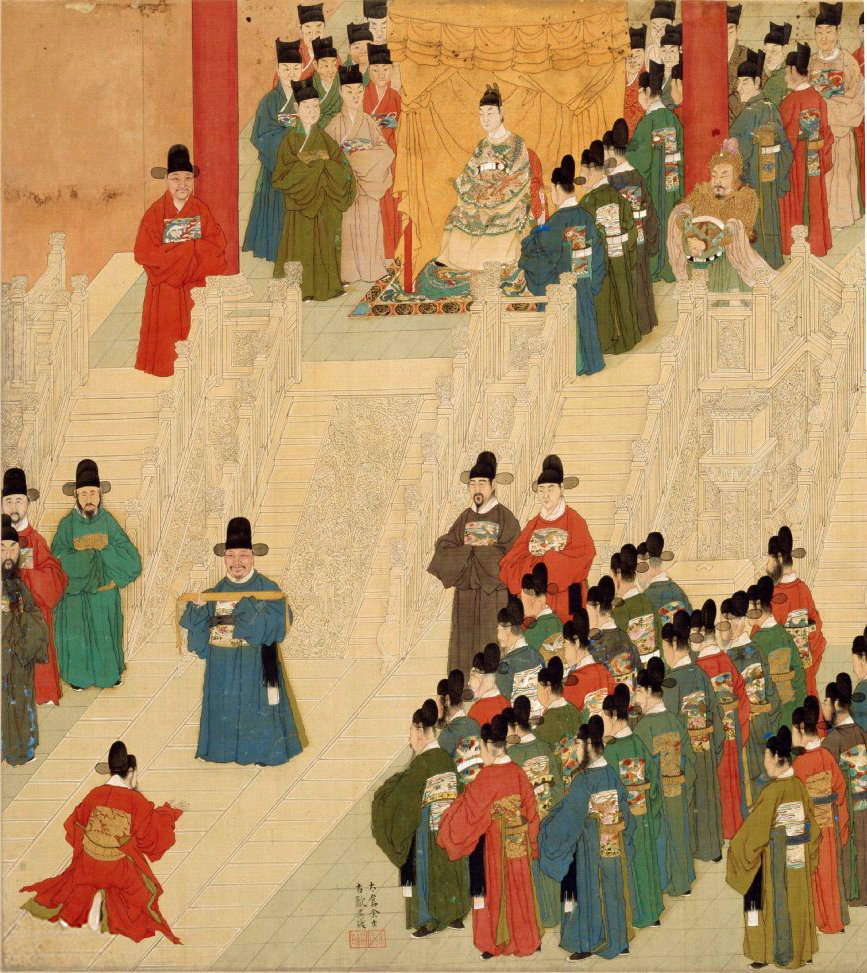
The Wanli Emperor during a regular audience, 1577

Zhang's actions were within the bounds of existing legislation, but critics viewed them as an abuse of power to promote his followers and exert illegitimate pressure on officials. Open criticism was rare until his father's death in 1577. According to the law, Zhang was supposed to leave office due to mourning, but the Emperor chose to keep him in office. This was not unprecedented, but he was widely criticized for disrespecting his parents. Despite the fact that the most vocal critics were punished with beatings, Zhang's reputation was damaged. In an attempt to suppress opposition, Zhang then ordered all high-ranking officials to submit evaluations of their own performance, resulting in the elimination of around fifty opponents.

Zhang died on 9 July 1582. After his death, he was accused of the typical offenses of high officials, including bribery, living in luxury, promoting unqualified supporters, abusing power, and silencing critics. Thereafter, his followers among the officials were dismissed, and in the beginning of 1583, Feng Bao also lost his position. (Note: After Feng Bao, in the late 1580s, Zhang Cheng (張誠) rose to a prominent position among the imperial eunuchs. He first led the Directorate of Ceremonial and then, from 1590, the Eastern Depot (secret service), but in 1596, he fell from power and was transferred to the Hongwu Emperor's tomb in Nanjing. The Emperor also confiscated his property and that of his relatives. Following this, Chen Ju (陳矩; 1539–1607), one of the most capable and respected Ming eunuchs, took over the eunuch offices. He was known for his caution, carefulness, and strong sense of duty.) The Emperor protected the officers, which boosted their morale to a level not seen since the mid-15th century. The Wanli Emperor's more aggressive military policy was based on Zhang's successes, as he attempted to replace static defense with more offensive tactics and appointed only officials with military experience to lead the Ministry of War. The Emperor also shared Zhang's distrust of local and regional authorities and opposition to factional politics. Like Zhang, the Emperor preferred to solve real problems rather than engage in "empty talk" (Note: Xuyan, 虛言.) and factional conflicts.

== Later reign (1582–1620) ==
=== Early years after Zhang Juzheng (1582–1596) ===
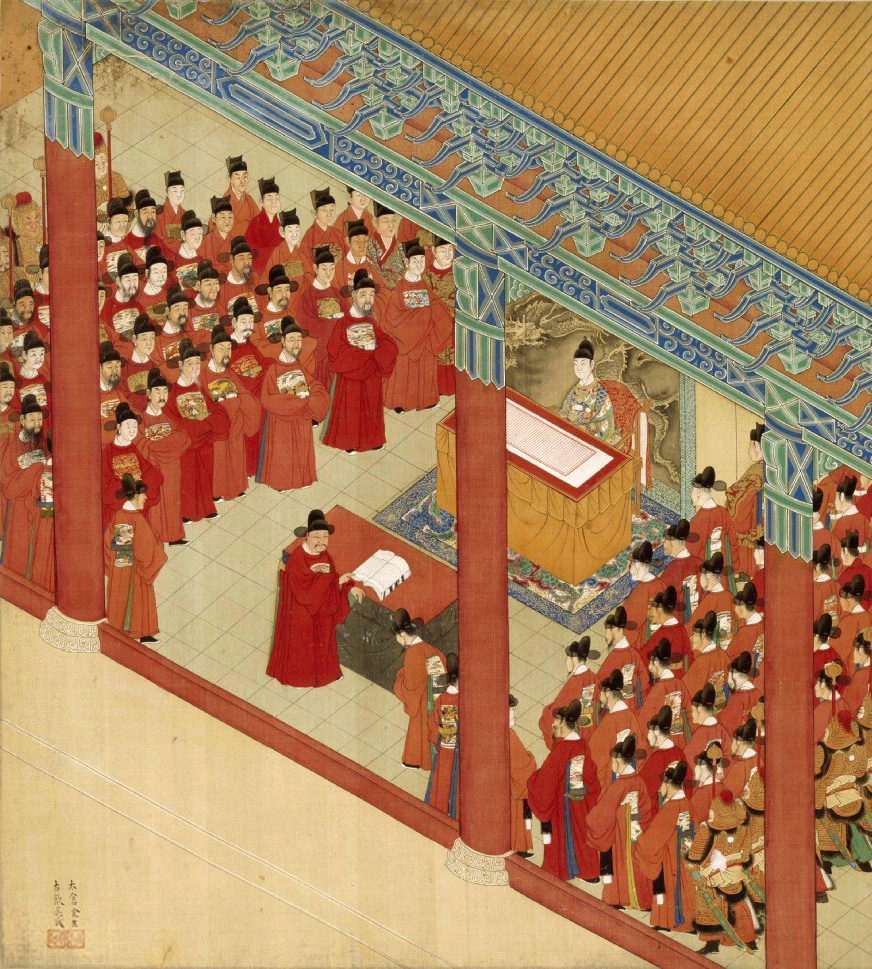
The Wanli Emperor during a ceremony held at the Hall of Literary Brilliance, where he received imperial lectures, 1583

After Zhang's death, Empress Dowager Li formed alliances with his successors, Shen Shixing, Xu Guo (許國), and Wang Xijue. A coalition emerged between the Empress Dowager, the grand secretaries, the Ministry of Personnel, and the Censorate to ensure efficient administration of the empire. The opposition objected to this alliance and deemed it illegal, but with the absence of a strong statesman in the Grand Secretariat, there was no one to bring the administration under control. Both the Emperor and opposition officials feared the concentration of power in the Grand Secretariat and worked to prevent it. From 1582 to 1591, the Grand Secretariat was led briefly by Zhang Siwei (張四維) and then for eight years by Shen Shixing. Shen attempted to find compromises between the Emperor and the bureaucracy, while also tolerating criticism and respecting the decisions of ministries and the censors, but his efforts to create a cooperative and cohesive atmosphere were unsuccessful. In 1590, the Grand Secretariat's alliance with the leadership of the Ministry of Personnel and the Censorate fell apart, causing Shen to lose much of his influence. He was eventually forced to resign in 1591 due to his approach to the succession issue, which had lost him the confidence of opposition officials.

After 1582, the Emperor chose the leaders of the Grand Secretariat from among the opponents of Zhang Juzheng (after Shen Shixing, the position was held by Wang Jiaping (王家屏), Wang Xijue, and Zhao Zhigao (趙志皋) until 1601). Except for the short-lived Wang Jiaping, all of Zhang's successors—including Shen Yiguan (沈一貫), Zhu Geng (朱賡), Li Tingji (李廷機), Ye Xianggao, and Fang Congzhe (方從哲)—fell out of favor and were either accused by censors during their lifetime or posthumously. (Note: In an attempt to avoid this fate, Li Tingji declined the appointment of senior grand secretary, citing illness. He retreated to a desolate temple and persisted in his refusal to hold office for three years and nine months before the Emperor finally signed his retirement in 1613.)

Opposition to Zhang, led by Gu Xiancheng, succeeded after his death in condemning him and purging his followers from the bureaucracy. This, however, enabled censors to criticize senior officials more freely, which angered the Emperor and caused widespread dissatisfaction, as the critics offered no constructive solutions. Zhang's opponents soon became entangled in persistent factional disputes, obstructing efforts to restore a strong centralized government. From 1585, censors also began to criticize the Emperor's private life. His reluctance to impose harsh punishments emboldened them. The Wanli Emperor attempted to silence informants among his servants and gradually ceased responding to criticism. In 1588, accusations that he had accepted a bribe from a eunuch shocked the Emperor and led him to withdraw from cooperation with officials. He minimized contact with them, canceled the morning audience, and appeared publicly only at military celebrations. Communication with the bureaucracy was largely limited to written reports, often unanswered. Toward the end of his reign, he obstructed personnel appointments, leaving offices vacant and allowing officials to depart without written consent—an illegal practice that went unpunished. By 1603, nine of thirteen regional inspector posts remained unfilled, and by 1604, nearly half of prefectural offices and more than half of ministerial and vice-ministerial posts in both capitals were vacant. The Emperor also deliberately left many eunuch posts empty, especially the head of the Directorate of Ceremonial, in an effort to weaken ties between eunuchs and officials. This policy resulted in significant financial savings from unoccupied positions.

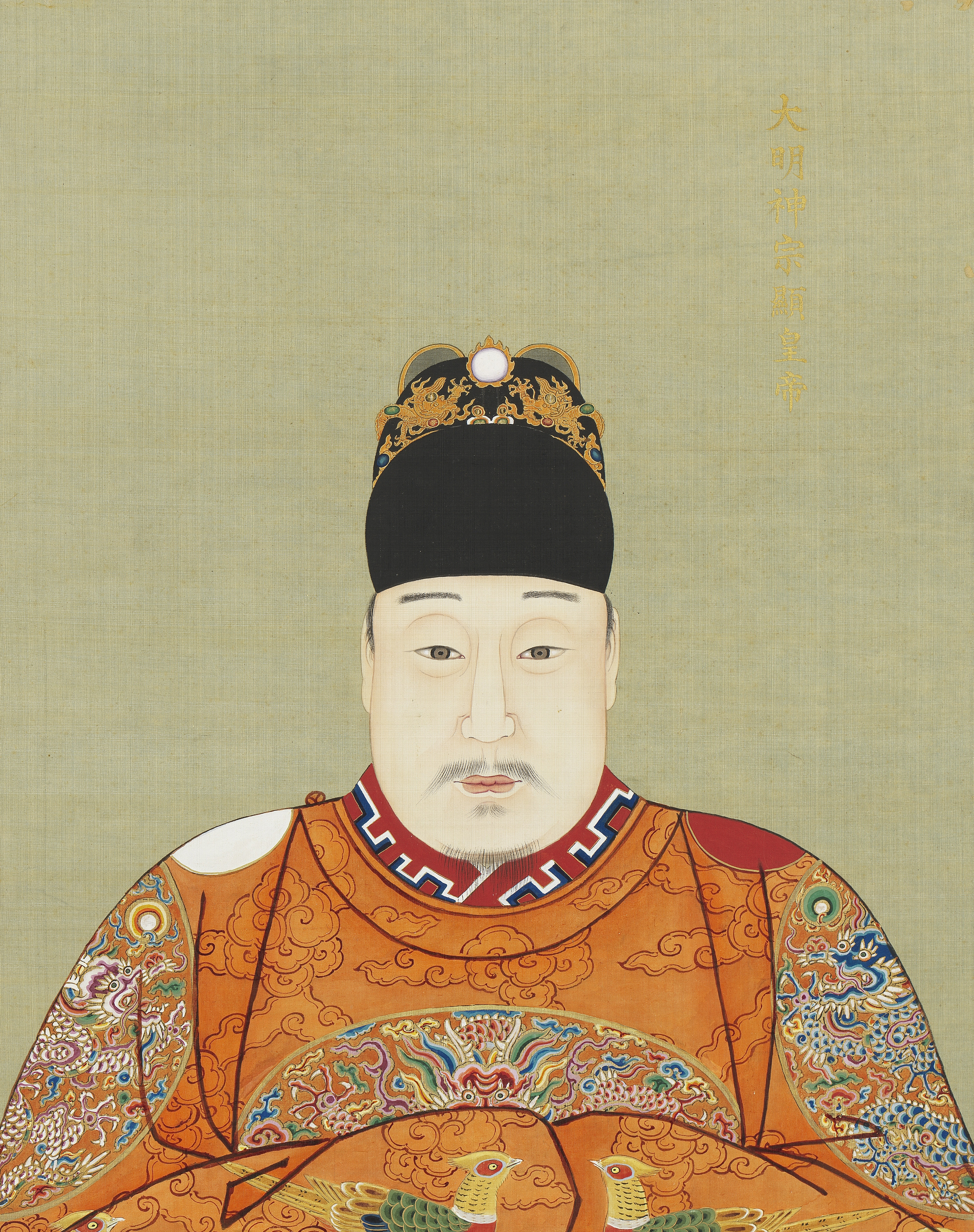
The Wanli Emperor in his middle age

The Emperor's lack of involvement in official positions did not affect the administration's responsibility for tax collection. In times of military or other serious issues, he sought advice from responsible officials in ministries and the Censorate, and was not hesitant to appoint capable individuals outside of the traditional hierarchy to handle the situation, but he had a lack of trust in the regular administration and often found ways to bypass it. While he may have left some memoranda unanswered, he actively responded to others. Although the Emperor left some high positions vacant, the authorities were able to function under the guidance of deputies and the country's administration continued to run smoothly. Assistance was provided to those affected by famine, rebellions were suppressed, border conflicts were resolved, and infrastructure was maintained. (Note: The 180 km long Jia Canal was a major construction project, running parallel to the Grand Canal further east near Xuzhou. Its construction began in 1593 and faced numerous challenges, such as unexpectedly high demand for stone and a shortage of funds. It was not until 1603 that work picked up. The canal was finally opened in 1609.)

Hundreds of memoranda arrived on the Wanli Emperor's desk daily, but he only read and decided on a handful of them. The rest were handled by commissioned eunuchs, who were equipped with the imperial "red brush". (Note: The emperors did not write their official correspondence with ink, as was customary, but with red vermilion paste.) These eunuchs mostly confirmed the recommendations and proposals of the grand secretaries, but occasionally made different decisions if they believed the Emperor would not agree with the grand secretaries' proposals.

Despite his desire to reform the civil service, the Emperor was unable to do so, and he also did not want to simply confirm the decisions of the officials. Both sides—the Emperor and the bureaucrats—wanted the other to behave properly, but their efforts were unsuccessful and only served to paralyze each other. These disputes at the center weakened the state's control over the countryside.

=== Succession dispute (1586–1614) ===
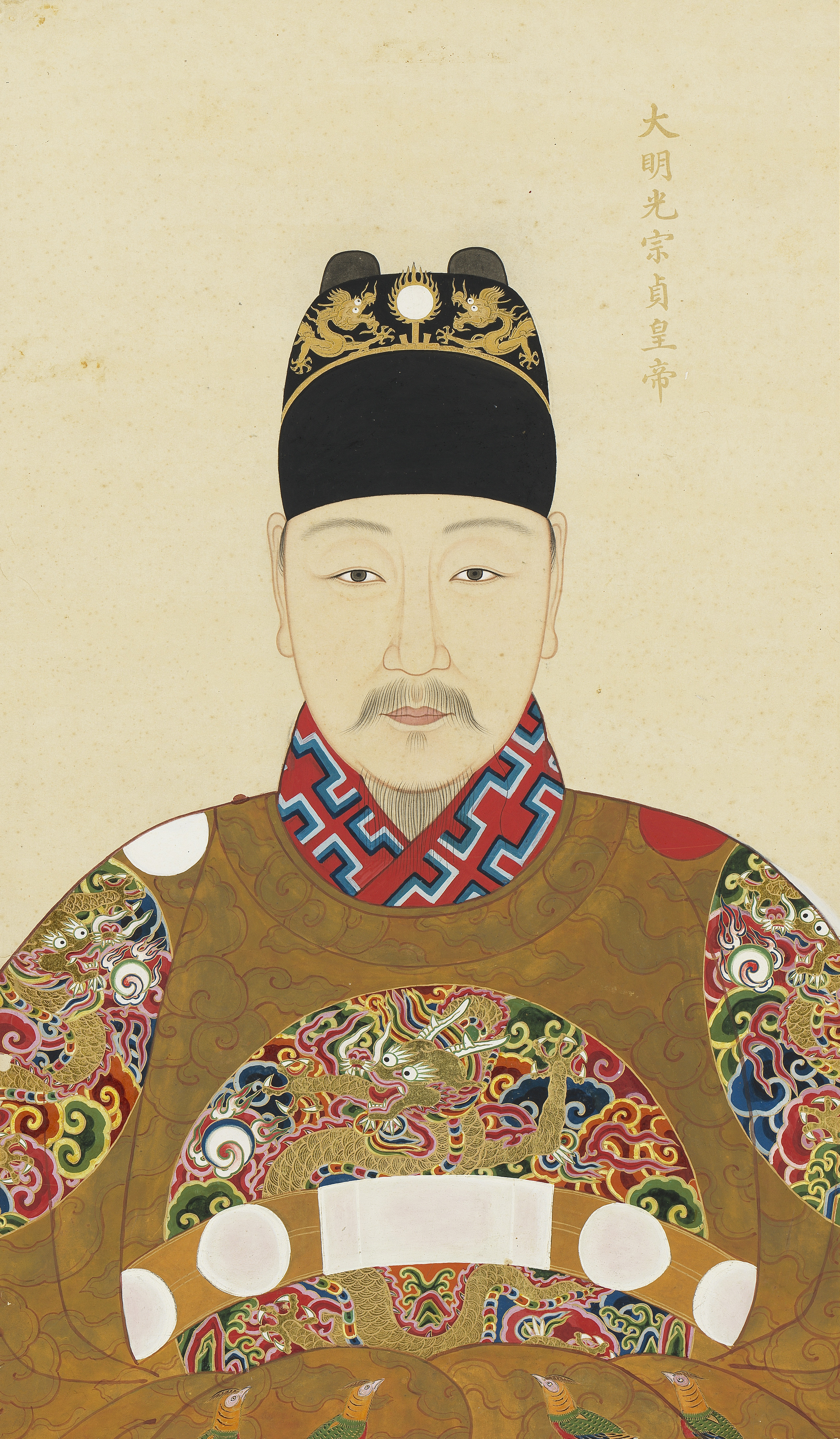
Zhu Changluo, the Wanli Emperor's eldest son and successor

In 1586, the issue of succession arose when the Emperor elevated his favorite concubine, Lady Zheng, to the rank of "Imperial Noble Consort" (Huang Guifei), placing her only one rank below the Empress and above all other concubines, including Lady Wang, mother of the Emperor's eldest son Zhu Changluo (1582–1620). This made it clear to those around him that he favored Lady Zheng's son Zhu Changxun (1586–1641), his third son, over Zhu Changluo as his successor. This caused a division among the bureaucracy; some officials defended the rights of the first son based on legal primogeniture, while others aligned themselves with Lady Zheng's son. The Emperor postponed his decision due to the widespread official support for the eldest son's rights. He justified the delay by stating that he was waiting for a son from the Empress. (Note: In the Ming dynasty, imperial succession followed the principle of primogeniture. According to the Ancestral Instructions of the Hongwu Emperor, the founder of the dynasty, the throne was to be inherited by the eldest son born to the emperor and empress, or by his direct heir, followed by younger sons of the empress. Sons born to concubines were excluded from succession.) When asked to appoint Zhu Changluo as heir to the throne at the age of eight so that his education could officially begin, the Emperor again defended himself by saying that princes were traditionally taught by eunuchs.

In 1589, the Emperor agreed to have Zhu Changluo installed as his successor, but Lady Zheng opposed this decision, causing a wave of controversy and, two years later, even arrests when a pamphlet accusing her of conspiring with high officials against the Emperor's eldest son spread in Beijing. In an attempt to improve her public image, the Emperor made efforts to portray Lady Zheng in a favorable light. This reached its peak in 1594 when he supported her efforts to aid the victims of a famine in Henan. He ordered all Beijing officials of the fifth rank and above to contribute to her cause from their incomes.

The failure to appoint a successor sparked frequent protests from both opposition-minded officials and high dignitaries, such as the grand secretaries Shen Shixing (in office 1578–91) and Wang Xijue (in office 1584–91 and 1593–94). Empress Wang and the Wanli Emperor's mother also supported the rights of Zhu Changluo, but the Emperor did not appoint him as heir until 1601, after facing pressure from another round of protests and requests. At the same time, the Emperor gave Zhu Changxun the title of Prince of Fu, but kept him in Beijing instead of sending him to the province as originally planned when he turned eighteen in 1604. This fueled rumors that the question of succession was still unresolved. It was not until 1614, after numerous appeals and protests against inaction, that the Emperor finally sent his younger son to his provincial seat. This decision was only made after the Emperor's mother firmly advocated for it.

In late May 1615, the "case of the attack with the stick" (梃擊案) occurred, greatly damaged the Emperor's reputation. A man carrying a stick was detained at Zhu Changluo's palace. A subsequent investigation revealed that he was Zhang Chai (張差), who was mentally unstable, and had intended to use the stick to settle a personal conflict with two palace eunuchs he had encountered outside the city. Initially, it was decided that he would be executed to resolve the issue, but Wang Zhicai (王之寀), a prison official, intervened and disputed the claim that Zhang was insane. He pushed for a public investigation involving the Ministry of Justice. This new version of events suggested that Zhang was actually of sound mind and two eunuchs close to Lady Zheng and her brother had invited him to the palace. This raised suspicions that their true intention was to assassinate the heir apparent and replace him with Lady Zheng's son. This caused a stir at court. The Emperor took the unprecedented step of summoning all civilian and military officials employed in Beijing and appearing before them (Note: This was the first meeting between the Emperor and the officials of the "outer court" since 1602. At that time, the Emperor fell seriously ill, and in anticipation of his death, he summoned the grand secretaries and ministers. He ordered the drafting of an edict to abolish the mining tax, cancel the contracts for state textile factories in Suzhou and Hangzhou, and porcelain factories in Jiangxi, as well as the dismissal of eunuchs overseeing them and the release of officials imprisoned for criticizing the Emperor. The following day, the Emperor's condition improved, and he withdrew the edict that had already been drafted. This sparked a wave of criticism from many officials towards Senior Grand Secretary Shen Yiguan, for not officially announcing the edict regardless of the Emperor's change of heart.) with Zhu Changluo and his children. The Emperor scolded the officials for doubting his relationship with Zhu Changluo. The prince himself confirmed their close relationship and requested an end to the matter. Ultimately, the Emperor decided to execute Zhang and the two eunuchs involved in the case, but officials from the Ministry of Justice opposed the execution and demanded further investigation. A compromise was reached through the mediation of the grand secretaries—Zhang was executed the following day, while the suspected eunuchs were to be interrogated. The interrogation did take place, but both eunuchs remained under the supervision of the Emperor's eunuchs. On the fifth day after the Emperor's speech, the officials were informed that the two eunuchs had died under palace confinement.

=== Mine tax crisis (1596–1606) ===
Ming China in the 1580s and its neighbors. Marked are both capitals, provincial capitals, and main state transportation routes.

In August 1596, due to poor tax collection and the depletion of the treasury from the costly restoration of the Forbidden City palaces destroyed by fire in April of that year, the Wanli Emperor made the decision to accept proposals for silver mining that had been suggested by lower-level administrators for several years. He dispatched a team consisting of eunuchs, Imperial Guard officers, and representatives from the Ministry of Revenue to the outskirts of Beijing to establish new silver mines. He also sent an Imperial Guard officer to Henan province with the same task, and within a few weeks, other officers and eunuchs were sent to Shandong, Shaanxi, Zhejiang, and Shanxi provinces. There was a long-standing tradition of sending eunuchs to various regions, as the business, trade, and mining industries provided opportunities for them to earn income. However, within a few days, this initiative was met with opposition from local authorities in Beijing, who raised concerns about the potential threat to imperial tombs in the mountains near Beijing and the difficulty of recruiting miners who were still engaged in illegal mining. The Emperor designated a protective zone for the tombs, but did not cancel the mining operation. He also appointed wealthy individuals from the local gentry to manage the mines and oversee necessary investments.

Confucian officials, who were concerned about the erosion of their authority, opposed the Emperor's initiative on ideological grounds, as they believed that the state should not engage in business and compete with the people for profit. They also objected to the Emperor's involvement in the mining industry, as it required the employment of miners who were considered untrustworthy and derogatorily referred to as "mining bandits". Another reason for the gentry and officials' opposition was the fact that eunuchs, a rival power group, were in charge of the mining operations. Furthermore, mining for silver was a complex task that required expertise and skills that the Emperor's eunuchs did not possess. To address this issue, the Emperor appointed wealthy local individuals as mine managers, who were responsible for paying the mining tax and delivering the silver, regardless of the profitability of the mine. The mining of silver shifted from underground to the coffers of the wealthy, effectively taxing them. American historian Harry Miller bluntly described the Wanli Emperor's actions as an "economic war against the wealthy".

After the war in Korea reignited in 1597, the Emperor made increased efforts to raise additional funds. Due to his lack of trust in the gentry, he began to establish an alternative eunuch regional administration. Gradually, the mining tax commissioners (kuangshi; 礦使; literally 'mining envoy') gained control over the collection of trade and other taxes, in addition to the mining tax (kuangshui; 礦稅) to which the Emperor gave official approval in 1598–1599. The Emperor granted these commissioners the authority to supervise the county and prefectural authorities, and even the grand coordinators. The imperial commissioners no longer had to consider the opinions of local civil or military authorities. Instead, they could assign tasks to them and even imprison them if they resisted. While the Emperor disregarded the protests of officials against the mining tax and the actions of the eunuchs, he closely monitored the reports and proposals of the eunuchs and responded promptly, often on the same day they arrived in Beijing. In 1599, he dispatched eunuchs to major ports, where they took over the powers of official civil administration. The Emperor finally resolved disputes with officials defending their powers in the spring of 1599 by officially transferring the collection of taxes to mining commissioners. This expansion of eunuch powers and their operations earned the Emperor a reputation among Confucian-oriented intellectuals as one of the most avaricious rulers in Chinese history, constantly seeking ways to fill his personal coffers at the expense of government revenue.

According to American historian Richard von Glahn, tax revenue from silver mines increased significantly from a few hundred kilograms per year before 1597 to an average of 3,650 kg per year in 1597–1606. In the most successful year of 1603, the revenue reached 6,650 kg, accounting for approximately 30% of mining. Modern Chinese historians Wang Chunyu and Du Wanyan estimate that mining tax earned the state an additional 3 million liang (110 tons) of silver, with the eunuch commissioners retaining eight or nine times more. Another estimate suggests that in 1596–1606, the mine commissioners supplied the state with at least 5.96 million liang of silver, but kept 40–50 million for themselves. While officials commonly profited from their positions, eunuchs were known to pocket a significantly larger portion of the collected funds.

At the turn of the years 1605/1606, the Emperor realized that not only gentry officials, but also eunuchs, were corrupt. He also recognized that the mining tax was causing more harm than good. In January 1606, he made the decision to abandon the attempt at alternative administration and issued an edict to abolish state mining operations. Tax collection was then returned to the traditional authorities. The gentry not only suffered financially from the eunuchs' actions, but also lost control over the financial transactions between the people and the state. This loss of control was a significant blow to their perceived dominance over the people. It was a humiliating experience and disrupted the natural order of things. By 1606, the gentry regained their dominance over both the people and the state as a whole.

=== Reforms in the selection and evaluation of officials ===
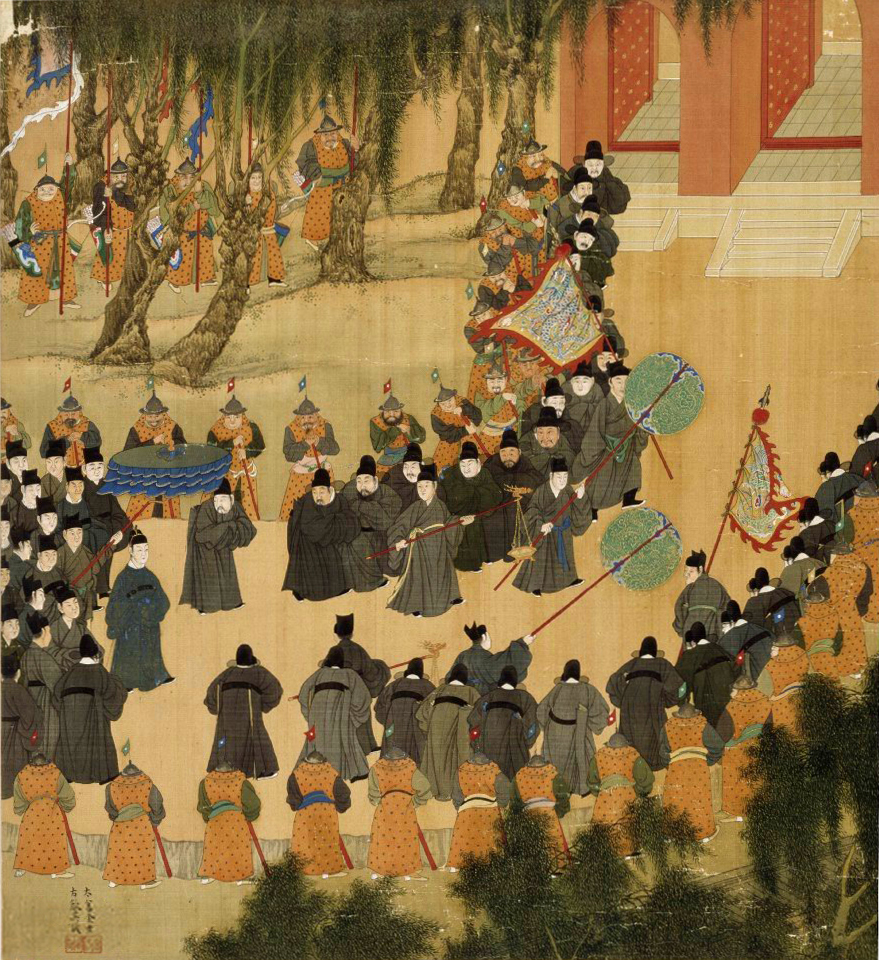
The Wanli Emperor on his way to pray for rain at the Temple of Heaven, 1585

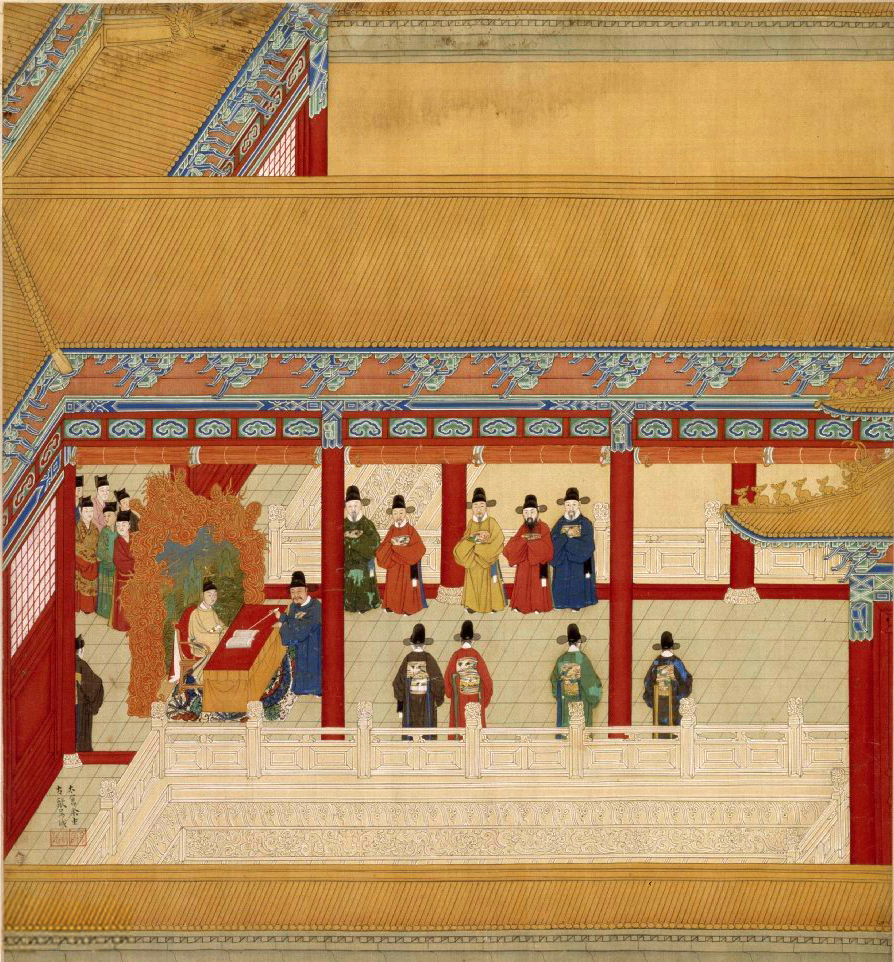
The Emperor received daily lectures in a passage behind the Hall of Literary Brilliance, 1585

In the Ming administrative system, ultimate authority rested with the emperor, but it required an energetic and competent ruler to effectively carry out this power. In cases where the ruler was not capable, the system of checks and balances resulted in collective leadership. This was due to the dispersion of power among various authorities. In the mid-15th century, a system of collective debates (huiguan tuiju; literally 'to rally officials and to recommend collectively') was established to address issues that were beyond the scope of one department. These gatherings involved dozens of officials discussing political and personnel matters. The importance of public opinion (gonglun; 公論) grew and the autocratic power of the emperor was limited.

During the Wanli Emperor's reign, collective debates resolved the appointment of high state dignitaries. At the beginning of his reign, Zhang Juzheng successfully abolished these debates, giving the emperor the power to appoint high officials based on his own suggestions, but after Zhang's death, the debates were reinstated and the emperor's power was once again limited. Despite this, the Wanli Emperor attempted to overcome these restrictions, such as in 1591 when he announced his decision to appoint the Minister of Rites, Zhao Zhigao, as senior grand secretary without consulting with other officials. Minister of Personnel Lu Guangzu criticized this decision, arguing that it violated proper procedure and undermined the fairness and credibility of the government's decision-making processes. Lu and others believed that collective consideration of candidates in open public debate was a more impartial and fair method, as it eliminated individual bias and ignorance. The Emperor promised to follow the proper procedure in the future, but he continued to occasionally appoint high dignitaries without collective debate, which always sparked protests from officials.

In the late Ming period, there was a widespread belief that public opinion held more weight than individual opinions. This was evident in the way political and administrative issues were addressed, with decision-making being based on gathering information and opinions from officials through questionnaires and voting ballots. This also had an impact on the evaluation of officials, as their performance began to be judged not only by their superiors but also by the wider community. In 1595, Minister of Personnel Sun Piyang conducted a questionnaire survey on the conditions of several offices and used the results to persuade the Wanli Emperor to dismiss a certain official from Zhejiang. The survey had received a large number of negative comments, including accusations of corruption and other crimes. This unprecedented event sparked a heated debate, with Zhao Zhigao arguing that anonymous questionnaires should not be the main criteria for evaluation and that no one should be accused of criminal offenses based on unverified information from anonymous sources. Sun defended himself by stating that solid evidence against the individual was not necessary, as they were not being accused or standing trial. He believed that in evaluating officials, it was sufficient for him to impartially discover the widely held opinion of the individual's recklessness through the survey.

The reform of civil servant evaluations resulted in their careers being dependent on their reputation, as determined by the ministry and censors through anonymous surveys filled out by their colleagues. This shift, along with collective debates, elevated the significance of public opinion during the Wanli Emperor's reign, leading to intense public debates and conflicts as groups of officials vied for control of public opinion while the Emperor's authority and the weight of his voice declined.

=== Donglin movement and factional struggles (1606–1620) ===
In 1604, Gu Xiancheng, with the suggestion of his friend Gao Panlong, established the Donglin Academy in Wuxi, located in Jiangnan. The academy served as a hub for discussions and meetings. With the support of local authorities and the gentry, the academy quickly gained prominence. As the founders had been out of politics for many years, the government did not view it as a threat. The academy attracted hundreds of intellectuals and soon became a significant intellectual center across China. It also inspired the creation of similar centers in nearby prefectures, forming a network of associations and circles.

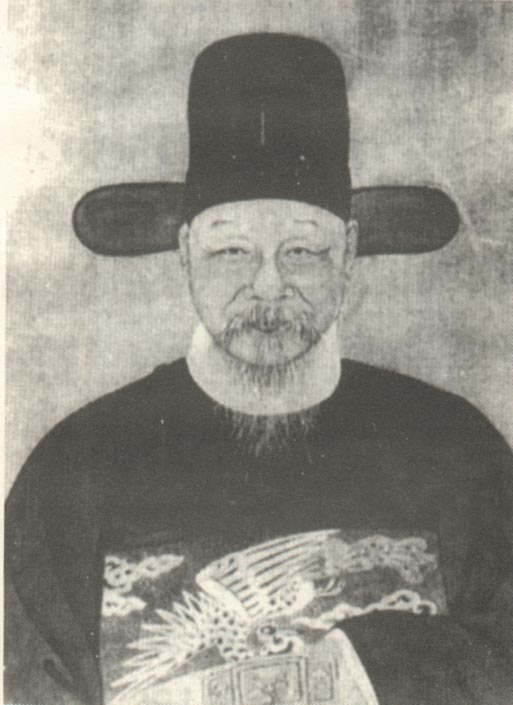
Portrait of Gu Xiancheng, the founder of the Donglin Academy

The academy described itself as a group of officials advocating strict adherence to Confucian morality. Supporters of the Donglin movement believed that moral cultivation required an exemplary life and made no distinction between private and public morality. They held that self-cultivation began in the mind–heart and extended to the family, local community, and public life, a view exemplified by Gao Panlong. From this perspective, Zhang Juzheng's failure to observe mourning for his father was condemned as evidence of moral corruption. The Emperor was likewise criticized for delaying confirmation of his eldest son as heir, which the Donglin considered unethical and unacceptable. The Donglin movement promoted a Confucian vision of government grounded in patriarchal family values extended to the state. Local administration, they argued, should be led by educated gentry who would morally guide the people. Technical aspects of governance were therefore regarded as secondary, with administrative problems addressed through the promotion of Confucian virtues, moral instruction, and self-sacrifice for higher ideals. Internal disputes focused on moral character rather than professional competence, with opponents accused of immorality. (Note: One example of political issues that the supporters of the Donglin movement focused on was the case of Zhu Huakui, Prince of Chu. His father, Zhu Yingxian, Prince Gong of Chu, died in 1571, and Zhu Huakui, who was born in the same year, was confirmed as the Prince of Chu by the Emperor in 1580. In 1603, thirty members of the imperial family petitioned the Emperor, declaring Zhu Huakui illegitimate and claiming that his alleged father was impotent. They requested that the Emperor strip him of his title. The Donglin supporters successfully pushed for an official investigation involving dozens of officials. The Emperor eventually closed the investigation, declaring the prince legitimate, but the case continued as officials from both sides accused each other of bribery and dishonesty. The Emperor distanced himself from their disputes and did not respond to the accusations.) This emphasis on morality allowed the Donglin to present themselves as motivated not by private interests but by universal moral principles. Although the movement's leaders did not return to office until the end of the Wanli Emperor's reign, it exerted considerable influence among junior officials in Beijing.

The Donglin movement opposed the concentration of power in the Grand Secretariat and the ministries, advocating for the independence of the censorial-supervising personnel. They also called for limitations on the activities of eunuchs within the imperial palace. Their stance on succession was based on principles, arguing that the ruler does not have the right to unilaterally change fundamental laws of the empire, including succession rules. However, their emphasis on decentralization and prioritizing morality and ideology over pragmatism hindered effective governance of the empire, which was already challenging due to its size and population.

The tendency to equate personal virtue with administrative talent led to morality becoming the main target in factional disputes. The regular evaluation of the capital officials was often used to eliminate opponents. In 1577, Zhang Juzheng used this type of evaluation for the first time, resulting in the removal of 51 of his opponents. Another evaluation in 1581 led to the dismissal of 264 officials in the capital and 67 in Nanjing, which was a significant purge considering that during the late Ming period, there were over a thousand officials serving in the central government in Beijing and almost four hundred in Nanjing. In 1587, Grand Secretary Shen Shixing removed only 31 jinshi, but none from the Ministry of Personnel, the Hanlin Academy, and the Censorate, where factional disputes were common. The censors also demanded the dismissal of the Minister of Works He Qiming (何起鳴), apparently for political reasons (as a supporter of Zhang Juzheng), just a month after his appointment, which angered the Emperor. The Minister was forced to leave, and the Emperor also dismissed the head of the Censorate and transferred the responsible censors to the provinces. This sparked protests against "the Emperor's interference in the independence of the censorial office".

In the 1593 evaluation, the Donglins utilized their positions in the Ministry of Personnel and the Censorate to eliminate the followers of the grand secretaries. The newly appointed Senior Grand Secretary, Wang Xijue, was unable to support his party members. He did, however, request the dismissal of several organizers of the purge during additional evaluations. The head of the Censorate opposed this, but the Emperor ultimately agreed, sparking further protests from junior officials, including future founders of the Donglin Academy. (Note: Zhao Nanxing (趙南星) and, later, Gu Xiancheng were dismissed from their official positions, while Gao Panlong was transferred to the far southern province of Guangdong.) By the time of the 1599 evaluation, the Donglin opposition had lost its influence, resulting in a more peaceful evaluation. In the 1605 evaluation, the Donglin movement once again attacked their opponents, and through Wen Chun (溫純), the head of the Censorate, and Yang Shiqiao (楊時喬), Vice Minister of Personnel, demanded the dismissal of 207 officials from the capital and 73 from Nanjing. The Emperor did not agree to such a large-scale purge and explicitly stated that several of the accused officials should remain in their positions. This was an unprecedented refusal and sparked sharp criticism, leading to a months-long debate filled with mutual recriminations. Even Heaven seemed to intervene when lightning struck the Temple of Heaven. Eventually, the accused officials were forced to resign, but so were the organizers of the purge, including Grand Secretary Shen Yiguan, the following year. While the Donglins were successful in dismissing their opponents, they did not have suitable candidates for top positions. Even when a candidate like Li Sancai emerged, he was thwarted in the same way—through an attack on his moral integrity—in Li's case, through bribery. This was also the first instance where a connection to the Donglin movement was used as an argument against a candidate.

In the 1611 evaluation, two anti-Donglin factions clashed, resulting in the downfall of their leaders (Tang Binyin (湯賓尹), Chancellor of Nanking University, and Gu Tianjun (顧天俊), teacher of the heir apparent). The career of the highest-ranking Donglin sympathizer, Vice Minister of Personnel and Hanlin Academy scholar Wang Tu (王圖), was also ruined. In the 1617 evaluation, three cliques based on regional origin were in conflict, formed by anti-Donglin censors. In the last decade of the Wanli Emperor's reign, the indecisive bureaucrat Fang Congzhe led the Grand Secretariat, while the Emperor left many high administrative positions vacant for long periods and simply ignored polemical memoranda.

=== Rise of the Jurchens ===
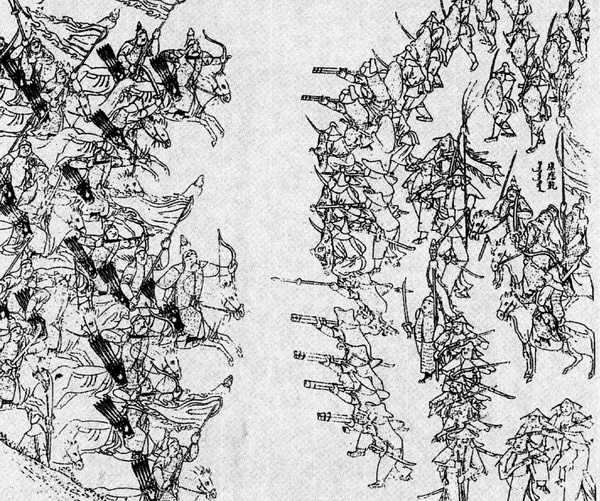
Battle of Sarhū. Illustration from Nurhaci's biography, 1635

In 1583, Nurhaci, the leader of one of the many Jurchen tribes in southern Manchuria, began to establish his own state. He united the Jurchens with the support of the Ming dynasty, particularly Li Chengliang. Some Ming officials grew concerned about Nurhaci's growing power and called for his destruction in 1587, but this issue was not resolved due to discussions within the Ming administration. Nurhaci acknowledged his subordinate relationship to the Ming dynasty and paid tribute in 1590 and 1597 by personally visiting Beijing. By the early 1590s, Nurhaci's state had a large military force, estimated at 30–40,000 horsemen and 10,000 infantry. The Ming authorities declined his offer to lead his army into Korea against the Japanese. In 1599, as part of building his state, Nurhaci introduced a new Manchu script and in 1601, a new organization based on banners. In 1603, he reached an agreement with Ming generals in Liaodong to define the borders.

In 1618, Nurhaci had gained control over all the Jurchen tribes except for Yehe and Haixi, who were under Ming protection. An attack on these tribes would trigger a war with China, which is exactly what Nurhaci provoked by raiding Fushun in May 1618. The Ming retaliated with an expedition in early April 1619, after extensive and costly preparations. (Note: The land tax was increased three times between 1618 and 1620 in order to gather funds for the provision of equipment for the troops stationed in Liaodong.) Yang Hao, a former commander in Liaodong and leader of the Ming forces in Korea from 1597 to 1598, was put in charge of the overall command. The army was divided into four corps, led by experienced generals (from north to south) Ma Lin, Du Song, Li Rubai, and Liu Ting. The Ming troops consisted of about 100,000 men, including 83,000 Chinese, with the rest being Korean and Jurchen allies. On the other hand, Nurhaci had 50–60,000 soldiers at his disposal, but unlike the Chinese, he did not divide them. Instead, he used his knowledge of the terrain, weather, and mobility to his advantage and crushed the individual Ming corps one by one. First, he defeated Du Song's corps on 14 April, followed by Ma Lin's the next day. Yang Hao ordered a retreat, and while Li Rubai attempted to retreat as well, the order did not reach Liu Ting and his corps, resulting in their defeat on 20 April. Du and Liu both fell in battle. After defeating the Ming, Nurhaci joined forces with the remaining Jurchens and occupied Kaiyuan, where he killed Ma Lin, and Tieling in northern Liaodong. Li Rubai was accused of cowardice and committed suicide under the weight of criticism, while Yang Hao was imprisoned and executed in 1629.

== Military campaigns ==
=== Rebellion in Ningxia ===
In March 1592, a rebellion broke out in Ningxia, an important fortress city on the northwestern frontier. Led by Chinese officer Liu Dongyang, the soldiers of the garrison revolted. The rebellion was also joined by Pubei, a Mongol and deputy regional commander who had three thousand horsemen in his personal guard. Due to his origin, the rebellion was attributed to him. The rebels successfully took control of Ningxia and nearly fifty nearby fortresses. They demanded recognition from the government, threatening to ally with the Ordos Mongols. At the time, Ningxia had a population of 300,000 and a garrison of 30,000 (or 20,000) soldiers. The city walls were six meters thick and nine meters high, making it a formidable stronghold. The rebels were experienced soldiers.

On 19 April, the Emperor was informed of the uprising and immediately summoned Minister of War Shi Xing (石星). Following the minister's proposal, he ordered the mobilization of 7,000 soldiers from Xuanhua and Shanxi. Wei Xueceng, an experienced military official and commander-in-chief of the three border regions (Xuanfu, Shanxi, and Datong), was entrusted with the task of suppressing the rebellion. The Emperor provided him with a number of officers and officials, including Ma Gui. Wei successfully secured the southern bank of the Yellow River, captured key forts, and within weeks recaptured nearby frontier forts, leaving only the city of Ningxia under rebel control, but he then declared that he did not have enough men and equipment and took a passive stance. Despite the reinforcements provided, he insisted on negotiating with the insurgents, citing concerns for the lives of civilians in Ningxia. The Emperor discussed the situation with the grand secretaries, the censors and the ministers, and ultimately took a decisive position to suppress the rebellion as quickly as possible. For the next six weeks, Ming troops besieged Ningxia, occasionally facing resistance from the Mongols. In the fourth month of the year, the Ming launched an attack on the city and managed to eliminate about 3,000 defenders, but their attempt to penetrate the city through the northern gate failed and resulted in heavy losses.

In an effort to conduct the siege operations more effectively, the Emperor appointed Li Rusong as the military superintendent in charge of suppressing the rebellion. The bureaucracy in the capital were shocked at this appointment, as civilian officials, not professional officers, traditionally held the position and overall command. In July, Ming reinforcements arrived at Ningxia and skirmishes between the besiegers and the rebels continued. At the end of July, Li also arrived and began attacking the city day and night in early August. The rebels were only able to repel them with difficulty. Meanwhile, the Japanese were successfully occupying Korea, prompting the Emperor to urge a swift resolution of the situation. In late August, Wei Xueceng was arrested for his reluctance and taken to Beijing. The Emperor then approved Shi Xing's plan to build ramparts around the city and fill the interior, including the city itself, with water.

On 23 August, a 5.3 km long dam surrounded Ningxia. The rebels gained the alliance of Mongol chief Bushugtu, but Li Rusong sent generals Ma Gui and Dong Yiyuan with part of the army to attack them and occupy the passes east of the city. Ma and Dong successfully repulsed the Mongols. By 6 September, the city was already flooded with almost three meters of water, causing the rebels' attacks to fail and the besieged to suffer from a critical shortage of food. The city's inhabitants and Ma Gui pleaded with the insurgents to surrender in order to save human lives, but the rebels continued to launch unsuccessful raids while also facing attacks from Ming troops. By the end of September, the 18,000-strong Mongolian army was blocked north of the city. Li and Ma led a counterattack and drove the Mongols back. As the water breached the walls, the city was eventually taken in mid-October. Pubei committed suicide, while several other rebel leaders were captured and executed. The Emperor then sent a large portion of the troops from Ningxia, led by Li Rusong, to Korea.

=== Imjin War ===
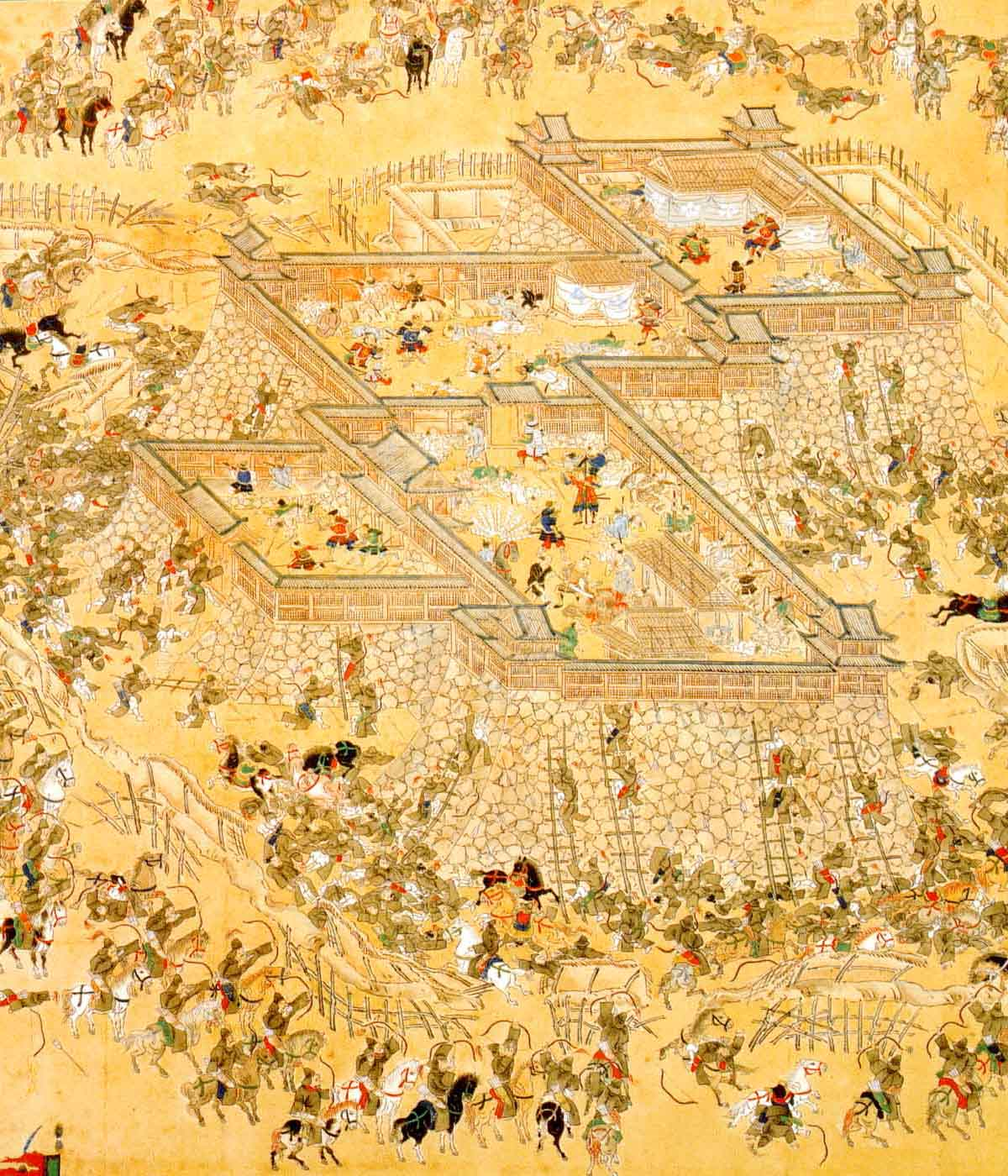
The Korean-Chinese army besieges the Japanese in their fortress of Ulsan

By the early 1590s, Japanese warlord Toyotomi Hideyoshi had successfully unified Japan under his rule, but his ambitions extended beyond just ruling over his own country. In challenges sent to the rulers of neighboring countries, he declared his intention to dominate East Asia and establish his rule from the Chinese port of Ningbo. His first target was Korea, with the ultimate goal of conquering Ming China. The Chinese were well aware of the Japanese threat to their hegemony in East Asia and responded with vigor.

In May 1592, Japanese forces landed in Korea and rapidly advanced due to the unpreparedness of the Korean army, capturing Seoul within twenty days and moving northward. The Korean king fled toward the Yalu River on the Korean–Ming border. Korea appealed to Ming China for assistance, and the Wanli Emperor adopted an anti-Japanese stance, initially dispatching a small reconnaissance force of 3,000 troops. In August 1592, this force was surprised and destroyed by the Japanese at Pyongyang, shocking the Beijing court and prompting the organization of coastal defenses. Vice Minister of War Song Yingchang was sent to Liaodong, on the Ming-Korean border, to command the campaign and assemble a large army. Japanese occupation provoked widespread Korean resistance, which developed into guerrilla warfare. Naval victories by Admiral Yi Sun-sin in the summer and autumn of 1592 were crucial in sustaining resistance. After the suppression of the Ningxia rebellion, additional Ming troops and generals, including Li Rusong, reinforced the Liaodong army. In early 1593, Ming forces under Li entered Korea alongside Korean troops, and by May had driven the Japanese back to the area around Busan. This led Japan to agree to truce negotiations, though talks dragged on and collapsed in October 1596, prompting Toyotomi Hideyoshi to launch a second invasion. The renewed invasion in 1597 achieved limited success, as Japanese forces advanced to within 80 km of Seoul but were forced back southeast after Ming reinforcements arrived. Control of the sea proved decisive. After initial setbacks under an ineffective admiral, Korean naval dominance was restored when Yi Sun-sin was reinstated, confining Japanese forces to a defensive position between Ulsan and Sunchon. The Ming fleet arrived in May 1598 to support Korean naval operations, while heavy fighting and prolonged sieges continued on land. In the spring of 1598, part of the Japanese forces withdrew from Korea, though the remaining troops successfully resisted Ming-Korean attacks. Following Toyotomi Hideyoshi's death in September 1598, the remaining Japanese forces were evacuated from Korea by the end of the year.

The Imjin War was one of the largest military conflicts of the 16th century, with Japan mobilizing over 150,000 soldiers for the first invasion and over 140,000 for the second. The Ming dynasty also sent a significant number of troops, with over 40,000 soldiers in 1592 and more than double that in 1597. According to Chinese historian Li Guangtao, a total of 166,700 Ming soldiers were deployed to Korea and were provided with 17 million liang of silver and supplies, which was roughly equivalent to half a year's income for the Ming state. While the exact number of Korean soldiers is difficult to estimate, their numbers likely reached the tens of thousands. The losses suffered by Korea were devastating, with the Japanese presenting Hideyoshi with the noses of their enemies as proof of their victory instead of the usual heads. Modern historians estimate that the number of noses brought back to Japan ranged from 100,000 to 200,000.

=== Yang Yinglong rebellion ===
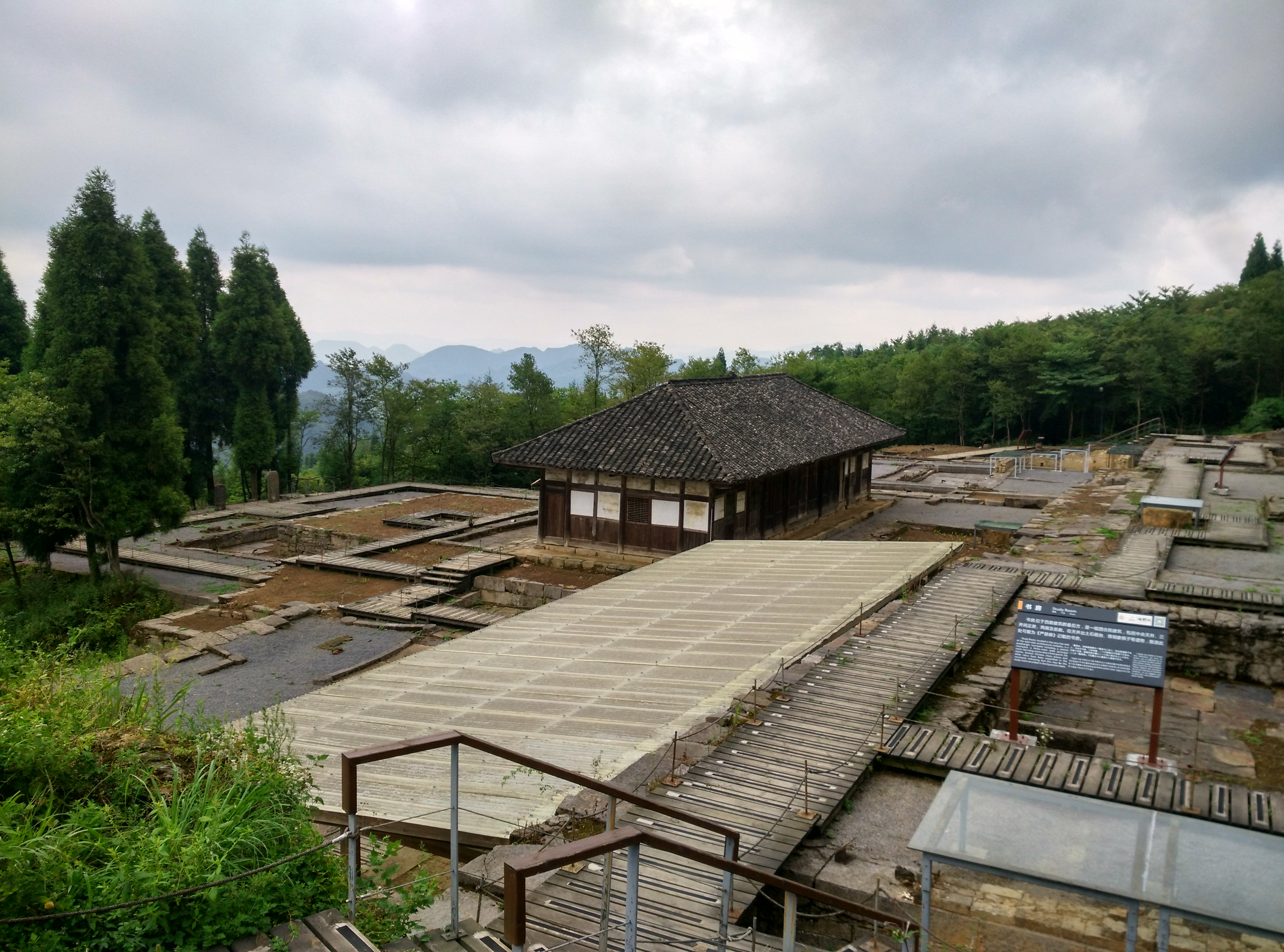
Remains of the palace in Hailongtun. In 2015, UNESCO added it to the World Heritage List as "a symbol of China's historical administrative procedures that unite the country while respecting the customs and way of life of minorities."

The Yang family, descendants of a 9th-century Tang general, controlled a mountainous region on the border of Huguang, Guizhou, and Sichuan. The area spanned over 300 km in the east-west direction and slightly less in the north-south direction, with its center located in Bozhou. The clan ruled this territory for many centuries and, although originally Chinese, they assimilated and identified with the local Miao tribes over time.

Yang Yinglong inherited his position from his father during the Longqing era. He distinguished himself on the Ming side in battles against other natives and Tibetans, and also received recognition from the Ming court for the quality of the wood he supplied, but he was very ambitious and viewed the Ming troops as weak. Problems with Yang Yinglong's actions continued for the local Ming authorities from 1587. He became involved in disputes between the local Miao tribes and Chinese colonists by attacking the former. Initially, the government in Beijing rejected the local authorities' requests for intervention, stating that there were more pressing matters to attend to and that Yang was simply seeking an opportunity to distinguish himself. In 1590, open and protracted fighting broke out between Yang's warriors and Ming forces. Eventually, Yang submitted to the Ming authorities, but was unexpectedly sentenced to execution. In order to secure his release, he offered a large payment and five thousand troops for the war in Korea. After his release, however, he hid in the mountains and plundered a number of prefectures and counties. In 1595, he was caught again and once again escaped punishment by offering a deal. His son Yang Chaodong was given a hereditary post and another son was sent to Chongqing as a hostage. The Emperor considered the matter settled and rewarded the commander, but within a year, Yang Yinglong was once again leading raids on the provinces of Huguang, Sichuan, and Guizhou, and even declared himself emperor. Over the next three years, his hundred thousand Miao soldiers spread fear throughout the area.

Focused on the war in Korea, the Wanli Emperor postponed solving the problems in the relatively peripheral southwest of the empire until early 1599, when he appointed the distinguished official Guo Zichang (1543–1618) as pacification commissioner of Sichuan. The former head of the Censorate, Li Hualong, was promoted to vice minister of war and put in charge of the military affairs of Sichuan, Huguang, and Guizhou. Several generals from Korea were sent to Sichuan, including Li Rumei and the well-known and feared Liu Ting (劉綎) in the southwest. Fighting with the rebels lasted the rest of the year, while they also attacked the major cities of Chongqing and Chengdu. At the turn of 1599/1600, minor skirmishes took place between the ever-strengthening Ming troops and the rebels. In the end, the Ming army had 240,000 soldiers from all over the empire. Yang Yinglong tried to mobilize indigenous warriors against the superior Ming troops, who were much better armed with cannons and rifles. He gathered perhaps up to 150,000 warriors by the end of 1599. (Note: Ray Huang in The Cambridge History of China, Volume 7, states that there were approximately 40,000–50,000 rebels and 200,000 soldiers on the Ming side,) but even the Ming armies were largely composed of local natives. After extensive preparations, Li Hualong planned to attack the rebels from eight directions, each with an army of 30,000 men. He launched the attack at the end of March 1600. The Ming troops systematically pushed back the enemy and in early June, surrounded Yang in the mountain fortress of Hailongtun. The fortress fell in a final assault in mid-July, with Yang killed. According to Li Hualong's final report, over 22,000 rebels were killed in the fighting.

Yang's chiefdom was then incorporated into the standard Chinese administrative system. In the following decade, Ming military actions continued quite successfully in the southwest, putting down several minor revolts. In an effort to prevent the recurrence of such a large-scale rebellion, the Ming authorities organized a systematic policing of the region.

== Death ==
In the final months of his life, the Wanli Emperor's health deteriorated significantly. In 1620, he experienced severe dizziness and was confined to his bed. He died on 18 August 1620. The day after his death, an edict was issued ordering the transfer of one million liang of silver from the Emperor's treasury to the frontier troops. Two days later, an additional million was sent from the treasury to strengthen the defenses of Liaodong. The edict also called for the abolition of mining and trade dues, and the dismissal of the eunuchs responsible for collecting them. On 28 August, the Wanli Emperor's eldest son, Zhu Changluo, ascended the throne as the Taichang Emperor.

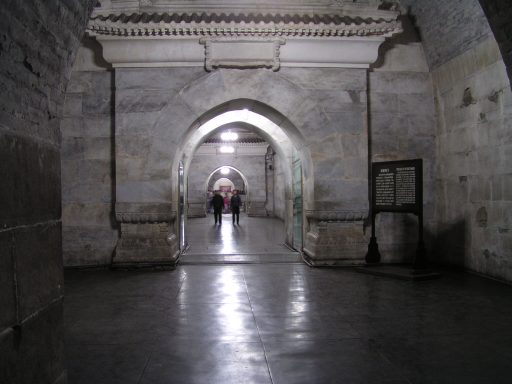
Inside the Dingling Mausoleum

The Wanli Emperor was buried in the Ming tombs at the foot of Tianshou Mountain outside Beijing, where thirteen of the sixteen Ming emperors were interred. His burial complex, the Ding Mausoleum, was constructed between 1584 and 1590 and consists of three walled courtyards and an underground palace beneath a large burial mound. Excavated by Chinese archaeologists in 1956–1957, the underground complex contained several chambers, including the burial chamber of the Wanli Emperor, Empress Wang, and the mother of the Taichang Emperor. More than 3,000 artifacts were recovered, including jewelry, gold and silver objects, jade and porcelain wares, clothing, and imperial crowns. Since the 1990s, the excavation has been criticized in China for its unprofessional methods, as many wooden and textile artifacts could not be properly preserved. In addition, numerous finds, including the remains of the Emperor and his consorts, were destroyed during the Cultural Revolution.

== Character ==
The Wanli Emperor was known for his restless and energetic nature in his youth. Intelligent, perceptive, and a quick learner, (Note: He learned to read at the age of four.) he remained well informed about affairs throughout the empire. Zhang Juzheng appointed eight teachers to instruct him in Confucianism, history, and calligraphy, and personally compiled historical stories to teach lessons in governance. Concerned that the Emperor's enthusiasm for calligraphy would distract him from state affairs, Zhang eventually ended those lessons. Between 1583 and 1588, the Wanli Emperor visited the Ming tombs, a collection of Ming-era mausoleums near Beijing and took an interest in the training of the palace guard. Fearing he might emulate the adventurous rule of the Zhengde Emperor (r. 1505–1521), officials discouraged his travels and interest in military pursuits, horse riding, and archery. Under their pressure, he ceased leaving Beijing after 1588, stopped attending public sacrifices after 1591, and abandoned both the early morning court audiences and evening Confucian studies with his tutors. In his youth, the Emperor was obedient to his mother and respectful toward eunuchs (Note: Eunuchs served the Ming emperors not only as guards and servants in the harem but also managed the operations of the entire Forbidden City palace complex. Outside of Beijing, they oversaw the imperial estates, supervised the use of firearms in the army, collected certain taxes and fees, and supervised state workshops. There was no shortage of eunuchs, but rather an excess: although voluntary castration was prohibited, the harsh living conditions of peasants led them to break the law and undergo castration in hopes of a better life in imperial service. In the early 16th century, eunuchs flocked to Beijing to seek employment from the emperor. In 1572, the Wanli Emperor accepted 3250 eunuchs into service; in 1578, 3570; in 1588, over 2000; and in 1601, 4500 (two-thirds for himself and the rest divided among princes of the imperial family). By 1620, over 20,000 castrated men had gathered in Beijing seeking employment; when rejected, they responded by inciting street riots.) and grand secretaries, but he became increasingly cynical and skeptical of rituals and bureaucrats as he grew older. His resistance to ritualized royal duties recalled his grandfather, the Jiajing Emperor, though he lacked the latter's decisiveness and flamboyance. While the Jiajing Emperor was a committed Taoist, the Wanli Emperor was more inclined toward Buddhism.

In the early years of his reign, the Wanli Emperor showed a strong commitment to good governance and the welfare of his subjects. Influenced by his devout Buddhist mother, Empress Dowager Li, he was generally reluctant to impose the death penalty. He was known for being both vulnerable and vengeful, and although he could be harsh toward offending officials, he did not regularly resort to violence. From the mid-1580s, he began to gain weight and his health deteriorated. By 1589, he cited chronic dizziness and general illness as reasons for his absence from court audiences, a condition that has been linked to his regular use of opium. (Note: In 1958, Chinese archaeologists opened and explored the Wanli Emperor's burial complex. Upon analyzing the bones, it was discovered that they contained a significant amount of morphine, indicating frequent consumption of opium.)

Zhang Juzheng and Empress Dowager Li raised the Wanli Emperor to be frugal and morally exemplary, an upbringing he later regarded as humiliating. When he learned that Zhang himself lived lavishly, he was deeply disillusioned. This perceived hypocrisy contributed to his growing cynicism toward officials. Two years after Zhang's death, the Emperor punished his family by confiscating their property and sending Zhang's sons to serve in the border garrisons after they were accused of illegal land dealings.

== Assessment ==
The Wanli Emperor's 48-year reign was the longest of the Ming dynasty. He is often portrayed in traditional Chinese historiography as one of the main causes of the decline and fall of the dynasty. Classical Chinese historians focused on his greed, misuse of eunuch power, factionalism within the government, seclusion in the Forbidden City, indulgence in alcohol and sex, extravagant tomb construction, and political blunders. The History of Ming (the official Ming history completed in 1739) and subsequent works depict him as a lazy, selfish, and reckless ruler who only cared about his harem and neglected state affairs. The animosity of Confucian scholars towards the Wanli Emperor stemmed from different visions of the state and the Emperor's protection of military officers against complaints from civilian officials who controlled the administration at the time. Even modern Chinese works on the Emperor continue to adhere to this traditional perspective. Furthermore, Western historiography tends to adopt the viewpoint of Chinese Confucians and perpetuates it, as seen in Charles Hucker's Dictionary of Ming Biography (1976) and Ray Huang's portrayal of the Wanli Emperor in 1587, a Year of No Significance: The Ming Dynasty in Decline (1981). Ray Huang also contributes to this image in his chapter on the Wanli Emperor in the Cambridge History of China, Volume 7 (1988). It is primarily Huang who is responsible for the Western perception of the Wanli Emperor as an isolated and frustrated ruler, "trapped" by his own bureaucracy.

The downfall of the Ming political system can be attributed to its reliance on ideological and moral principles. Zhang Juzheng, in his pursuit of effective rule through personal relationships, faced criticism from his opponents who focused on his personal life, deeming it immoral and illegitimate. This led to a lack of focus on the practical outcomes of his policies. After Zhang's death, the government became divided into factions, with officials in the Censorate and ministries engaging in feuds and purging Zhang's supporters. Important reforms were neglected, and the Emperor's indecisiveness only worsened the situation. The Emperor was not interested in following his officials' advice, preferring to act according to his own will and disliking being pressured, but he lacked the qualities of an effective despot. His mishandling of the succession question also eliminated the Grand Secretariat as a potential center for government restructuring—as attempted by Gao Gong and Zhang Juzheng—as the government suspected the grand secretaries of supporting the Emperor, depriving them of the ability to mediate between the ruler and the government.

The Wanli Emperor, like Zhang Juzheng, attempted to increase the military strength of the empire, control the civilian bureaucracy, reduce factionalism, and rely more on military officers rather than civil officials. During the first three decades of his reign, he devoted himself greatly to military affairs and did not hesitate to allocate funds for the army, including the 1619 expedition. Despite the defeat in 1619, he made efforts to protect the officers, such as Li Rubai, who were targeted by the government. During the Wanli era, the Ming armies maintained control over the border with the Mongols, intervened in border disputes in Burma, conducted raids in Mongolia and Manchuria, suppressed a major rebellion in Ningxia, participated in the war in Korea, and deployed 200,000 soldiers to suppress a rebellion in Sichuan and quell minor rebellions. After the Battle of Sarhū, the Ming government became embroiled in factional conflicts and began to blame others for their failures. Later Chinese Confucian scholars emphasized the defeats at Sarhū and downplayed the previous victories achieved by eunuchs, generals, and the Emperor.

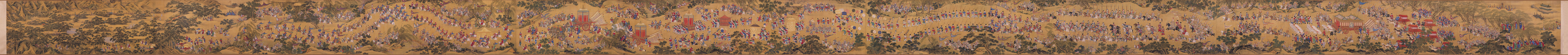
Departure Herald – A panoramic painting showing the Wanli Emperor travelling to the Ming tombs with a huge cavalry escort and an elephant-drawn carriage.
Return Clearing, the companion scroll of the Departure Herald

== See also ==
- Chinese emperors family tree (late)

== Notes ==
Wanli Emperor House of Zhu Born: 4 September 1563 Died: 18 August 1620
Regnal titles
Preceded by Longqing Emperor	Emperor of the Ming dynasty 5 July 1572 – 18 August 1620	Succeeded by Taichang Emperor
