= Ye Xianggao =

Ming dynasty politician (1559–1627)

Senior Grand Secretary
- In office 1608–1614
- Preceded by: Li Tingji
- Succeeded by: Fang Congzhe
- In office 1621–1624
- Preceded by: Liu Yizhu
- Succeeded by: Han Kuang

Personal details
- Born: 1559
- Died: 1627 (aged 67–68)
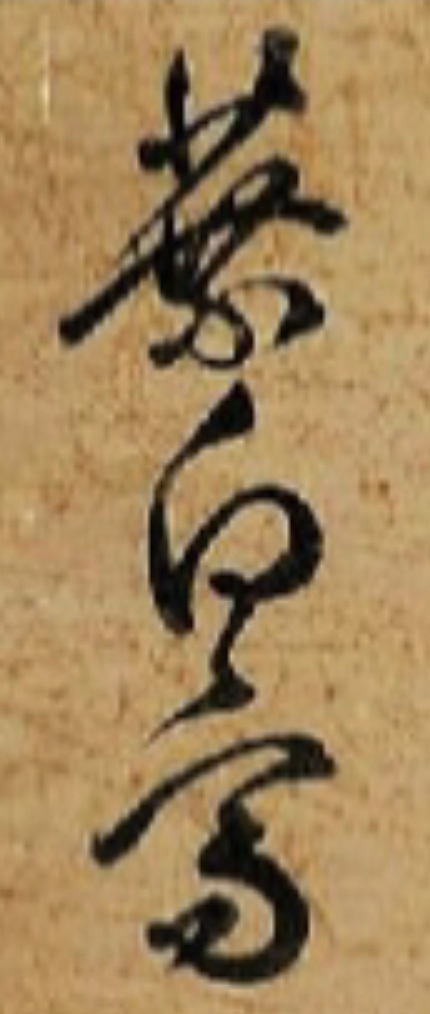
- Signature

Ye Xianggao (simplified Chinese: 叶向高; traditional Chinese: 葉向高; Wade–Giles: Yeh Hsiang-kao; 1559–1627) was a late Ming dynasty official who served in the Grand Secretariat under the Wanli Emperor from 1607 to 1614 and under the Tianqi Emperor from 1621 to 1624. He played an important role in staving off the Palace's persecution of the Donglin faction under Tianqi until his resignation in 1624.

== Life and career ==
Ye was born in Fuqing, Fujian. His father, Ye Chaorong, was for a time sub-prefecture magistrate in Yangli (養利), Guangxi. Ye Xianggao passed the provincial exam in 1579 in Fujian and graduated as a jinshi in 1583, becoming a bachelor at the Hanlin Academy. He later became the Director of Studies at the National Academy in Nanjing, where he was promoted to Left Deputy Supervisor of Instruction in 1598 and Right Vice Minister of Rights in 1599. In 1607, Ye was appointed as a Grand Secretary under the Wanli Emperor, a role he officially took on in the beginning of 1608. Ye became the Senior Grand Secretary in 1609, from which point on he was effectively the only serving Grand Secretary, simultaneously managing the metropolitan examination and drafting rescripts alone, until he persuaded the Wanli Emperor to appoint two additional Grand Secretaries on October 31, 1613. Ye became Chief Grand Secretary in 1613 and remained in that role until the Emperor accepted Ye's resignation on September 26, 1614 after Ye's repeated requests to leave and pleas that the reclusive Emperor heeded none of his advice.

Ye returned to the Grand Secretariat under the Tianqi Emperor in 1621, arriving in Beijing on December 3. Most bureaucrats in Beijing welcomed him with open arms, but some members of the Donglin faction were wary. Their concerns would prove misplaced, as Ye often stood up for Donglin officials in the face of increasing Palace persecution.

When, on June 7, 1622, Censor Zhou Zhongjian impeached Emperor Tianqi's chief eunuch aide Wei Zhongxian for being ignorant, power-hungry and illiterate, Ye comforted Wei that he was wise despite his illiteracy and should not be ashamed. Ye's expression of sympathy helped him maintain a working relationship with Wei for the remainder of Ye's time as Grand Secretary.

Following Supervising Secretary Fu Kui's anti-Donglin attack on Secretariat appointee Wang Wenyan on June 4, 1624, Ye admitted responsibility for having consented to Wang's appointment to the Secretariat and offered his resignation to the Palace. Ye simultaneously urged Wang to leave Beijing and told Donglin partisan Wei Dazhong, whom Fu Kui had also impeached, that Donglin principles left them blind to the bigger picture and did not stop them from being self-serving. Ye pleaded with the Palace to not seek retribution against Yang Lian and his allies after Yang's inflammatory mid-July memorial in 1624, but Ye was only able to delay Yang's arrest until after Ye resigned as Grand Secretary. Ye also asked the Palace to temper its punishment of Wan Jing, who accused Wei Zhongxian of embezzlement on July 28, and of Censor Lin Ruzhu after a hostile confrontation with Palace eunuchs in the first days of August, to no avail. Ye again asked to resign on July 31. After Palace eunuchs, in an unprecedented move, surrounded his house on August 4 believing he was harboring Lin Ruzhu, Ye lost all face. The Palace initially denied his request to resign on August 5 but, after Ye moved out of Beijing and told the Palace that he could not continue to serve, finally accepted his resignation on August 20, 1624. Ye's resignation cleared the way for full-scale persecution of the Donglin by the Palace.

After returning to Fujian, Ye hosted the Jesuit Giulio Aleni until Ye's death in the autumn of 1627. Ye was canonized as Wenzhong (Chinese: 文忠) (cultured and loyal), and the Chongzhen Emperor posthumously gave him the title of Grand Preceptor of the Emperor in 1929.
