= Empress Dowager Wang (Southern Ming) =

Chinese empress dowager (died 1651)

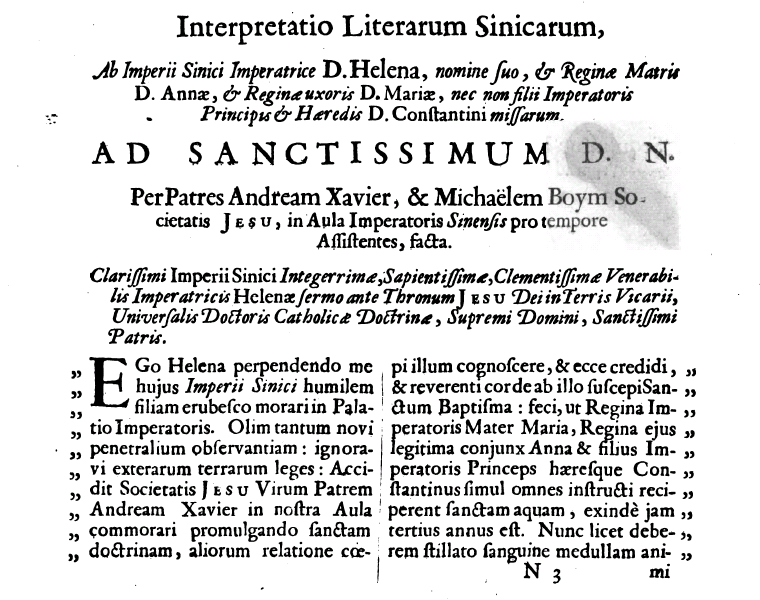
Letter from the Empress Dowager Wang (the "honorary mother" of the Yongli Emperor) to the Pope with a request for help. November 1650. Latin translation by Michał Boym.

Empress Dowager Wang (born Wang Huiling, Chinese: 王徽灵; c. 1594? – 1651), formally known as Empress Dowager Xiaozheng (Chinese: 孝正太后), was an empress dowager of the Southern Ming dynasty of China. She was the main consort of Zhu Changying, Prince of Gui, the father of the Yongli Emperor. She converted to Catholicism and adopted the name Helena.

== Family ==
She was the principal consort of Zhu Changying, and as such, she became the adoptive mother of his children with his other consorts. After the fall of the Ming dynasty, she was asked to approve of the installation of her stepson Yongli Emperor as Ming emperor. She gave her approval in November 1646, after which the Emperor could be enthroned. The Yongli Emperor showed his stepmother more influence than was considered necessary, and she acted as one of his principal advisers. It was said that she was:

"...versed in letters, aware of current events, analytical about tasks and clear in her reasoning. After the Emperor assumed the throne there was nothing in which he did not follow her wishes."

She, along with the Emperor's biological mother and his consort, was converted to Catholicism by the Jesuit Andreas Xavier Koffler in April 1648.

== Letters to the Pope ==
By November 1650, the Yongli Emperor's family had fled the Manchus and were staying at Nanning (see Southern Ming#The Nanning court (1646–1662) and Transition from Ming to Qing). As Empress Dowager Wang and several others had converted to Christianity, she wrote to Pope Innocent X, requesting aid. She gave the letters to Jesuit missionary Michał Piotr Boym, who, accompanied by two Chinese, set sail from Macao by the end of the year. The journey to Rome and back would end up taking eight and a half years. They arrived in Rome in November 1652 via Goa, Golconda, Ispahan, Tauris, Smyrna, Venice, and Lorette. By then, the pope had died and his successor Pope Alexander VII finally responded to the letters in December 1655. The new pope's banal reply expressed the hope that her empire would recover its former integrity. Boym set sail from Lisbon in 1656, and reached China once again in 1658/59. The Manchu Qing Dynasty denied him entry, and Boym soon fell ill and died, his letters undelivered.
