= Prince of Rui (Ming dynasty) =

Prince of Rui 瑞王
- Creation date: 1601, fief taken in 1627
- Created by: Wanli Emperor
- Peerage: 1st-rank princely peerage for imperial son of Ming Dynasty
- First holder: Zhu Changhao
- Last holder: Zhu Yousi
- Status: Extinct
- Extinction date: 1646
- Seat: Hanzhong

Prince of Rui (Chinese: 瑞王), was a first-rank princely peerage used during Ming dynasty, this peerage title was created by the Wanli Emperor. The first Prince of Rui was Zhu Changhao, 5th son of the Wanli Emperor. This peerage was later abolished by the Qing court after the 2nd prince, Zhu Yousi, surrendered to the Qing.

The peerage was created in 1601 and continued to 1646. The fief of this peerage was located at Hanzhong.

== Generation name / poem ==
As members of this peerage were descendants of the Yongle Emperor, their generation poem was:-

"Gao Zhan Qi Jian You, Hou Zai Yi Chang You. Ci He Yi Bo Zhong, Jian Jing Di Xian You"
高瞻祁見祐，厚載翊常由。慈和怡伯仲，簡靖迪先猷

This peerage used the poem until the You (由) generation.

== Members ==
- Zhu Changhao (朱常浩; 1590 - 1644) (1st), he was granted and held the title of Prince of Rui in 1601 and took his fief located at Hanzhong in 1627. He escaped to Sichuan to escape the pursuit of Shun forces in 1637 and later moved to Chongqing. He was killed by Zhang Xianzhong at Hanzhong, in 1644.
  - Zhu Yousi (朱由𣏌) (2nd), he succeeded and held the title after the death of his father in 1644. He surrendered to the Qing court in 1646 and the peerage was abolished.
