= Donglin Academy =

Former Chinese educational institution in Wuxi, China

- 東林書院
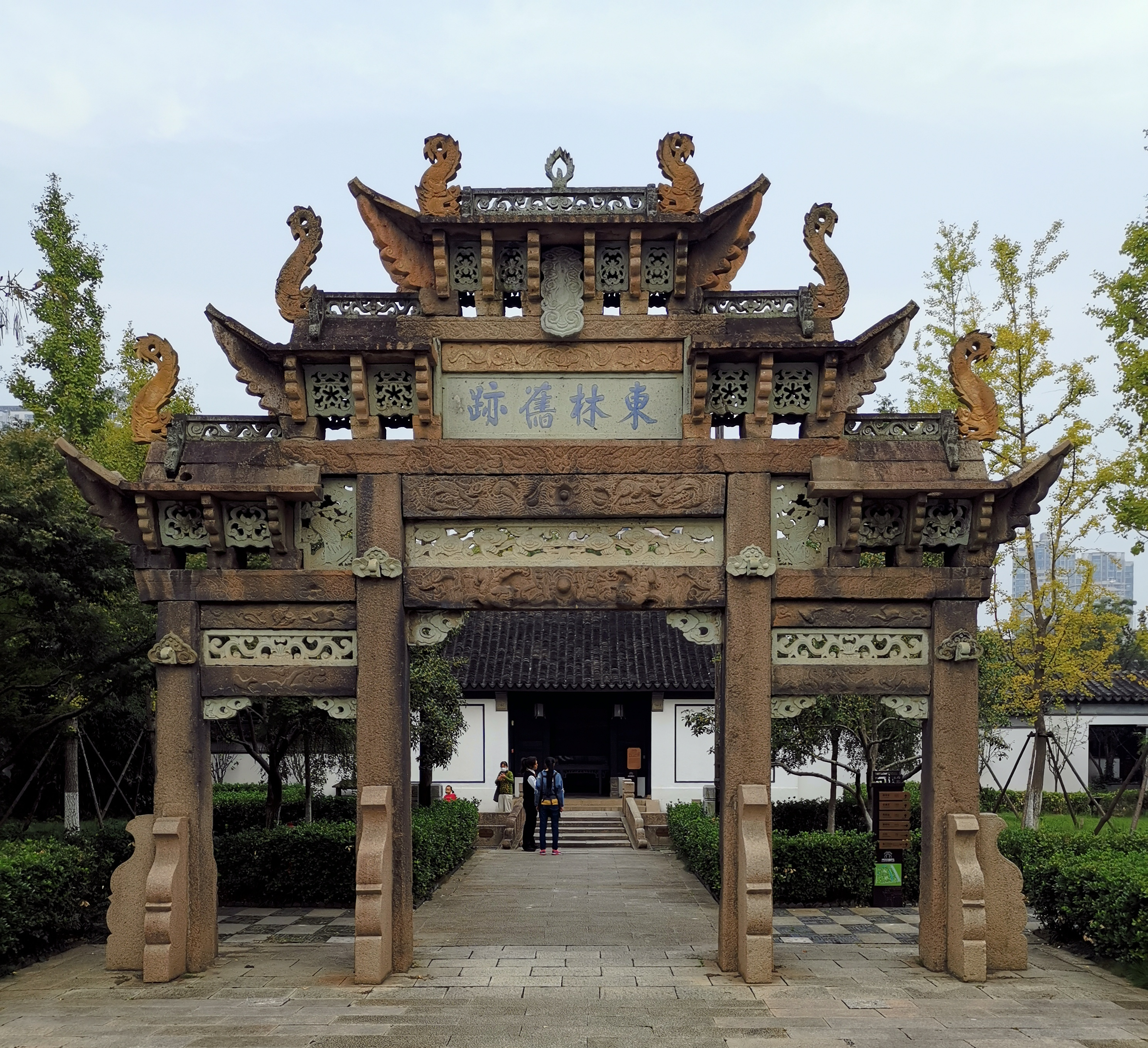
- The stone memorial arch in Donglin Academy
- Interactive map of Donglin Academy
- Location: Wuxi
- Created: 1606

The Donglin Academy (Chinese: 東林書院; pinyin: Dōnglín Shūyuàn; lit. 'Eastern Grove Academy', Wade–Giles Tung-lin), also known as the Guishan Academy (龜山書院 Guīshān Shūyuàn), was a former Chinese educational institution in Wuxi, China. It was originally built in 1111 during the Northern Song dynasty; the neo-Confucian scholar Yang Shi (楊時) taught there, but the academy later fell into disuse and disrepair. The name "Donglin" was inspired by the Donglin Temple at the base of Mount Lu, Jiujiang. Yang Shi visited the Donglin Temple and felt that it was a good place for teaching. When he finished his scholarship, he travelled to Wuxi and saw that the layout of the academy was similar to the Donglin Temple, so he taught at that site for 18 years. The academy was thus called "Donglin Academy".

== History ==
In 1604, during the Wanli era of the Ming dynasty, Gu Xiancheng (1550–1612), a Grand Secretary, along with the scholars Gao Panlong (高攀龍; 1562–1626), Qian Yiben (錢一本), An Xifan (安希范; 1564–1621) and Yu Kongjian (余孔兼) restored the Donglin Academy with financial backing from the local gentry and officials such as Ouyang Dongfeng (歐陽東風), the governor of Changzhou, and Lin Zai (林宰), the county magistrate of Wuxi. The academy gave its name to the resulting Donglin movement.

In 1626, the academy was brutally destroyed, leaving only part of the stone memorial arch. The contemporary academy was a reconstruction during the Qing dynasty by the Yongzheng and Qianlong emperors to win the support of Han Chinese scholars living in Wuxi.

The government of the People's Republic of China redecorated the academy between 1981 and 1982.
