= Zhu Changying =

Chinese prince (1597–1645)

Zhu Changying 朱常瀛

Prince of Gui
- Tenure: 1601 – 21 December 1645
- Successor: Zhu You'ai, Prince Gong
- Born: 15 April 1597
- Died: 21 December 1645 (aged 48)
- Burial: Xing Mausoleum
Names
- Zhu Changying (朱常瀛)
Posthumous name
- Prince Duan of Gui (桂端王) (initially); Emperor Titian Changdao Zhuangyi Wenhong Xingwen Xuanwu Renzhi Chengxiao Duan (體天昌道莊毅溫弘興文宣武仁智誠孝端皇帝) (conferred by the Yongli Emperor)
Temple name
- Lizong (禮宗)
- House: Zhu
- Father: Wanli Emperor
- Mother: Grand Empress Dowager Xiaojing

Chinese name
- Chinese: 朱常瀛
Transcriptions
Standard Mandarin
- Hanyu Pinyin: Zhū Chángyíng

Zhu Changying (25 April 1597 – 21 December 1645), formally known as Prince Duan of Gui, was a prince of the Ming dynasty and the seventh son of the Wanli Emperor. He was the father of the Yongli Emperor, the last Southern Ming emperor.

After his son became emperor, he was posthumously honoured as Emperor Duan (端皇帝), with the temple name of Lizong (禮宗).

== Family ==
=== Consorts and issue ===
- Empress Xiaoqinduan, of the Lü clan (孝欽端皇后 呂氏)
- Empress Xiaozheng, of the Wang clan (孝正皇太后 王氏; d.1651), catholic name Helena
- Empress Dowager Zhaosheng, of the Ma clan (昭聖太后 馬氏; 1578–1669)
  - Zhu Youlang, the Yongli Emperor (永历帝 朱由榔; 1623–1662), fourth son
- Unknown
  - Zhu You? (朱由?), first son
  - Zhu You?, Prince Min of Gui (桂閔王 朱由?), second son
  - Zhu You'ai, Prince Gong of Gui (桂恭王 朱由𣜬; 1623–1646), third son
  - Zhu Youzhan, Prince of Yongxing (永興王 朱由榐), fifth son
  - Zhu You?, Prince of Xintian (新田王 朱由?), sixth son
  - Zhu You?, Prince of Jianghua (江華王 朱由?), seventh son
  - Zhu Yourong, Prince of Jiashan (嘉善王 朱由榮), eighth son
  - Princess Anhua (安化公主)
  - Second daughter (9 March 1626 – 20 March 1627)
  - Princess Guangde (廣德公主)
