= Donglin movement =

17th-century Chinese philosophical movement

The Donglin movement (Chinese: 東林黨; pinyin: Dōnglíndǎng; Wade–Giles: Tung-lin-tang) was an ideological and philosophical movement of the late Ming and early Qing dynasties of China.

The movement was established in 1604, during the Wanli era of Ming, when Gu Xiancheng (1550–1612), a Grand Secretary, and Gao Panlong (高攀龍, 1562–1626), a scholar, restored the Donglin Academy in Wuxi with the financial backing of local gentry and officials.

The motivation for restoring the academy was concern about the state of the bureaucracy and its inability to bring about improvement. The movement represented a resort to moral Confucian traditions as a means of arriving at fresh moral evaluations. Thereafter the academy became a centre of dissent for public affairs in the late Ming and early Qing periods. Many supporters of Donglin were found in the bureaucracy and it became deeply involved in factional politics. The movement got momentum when the Donglin Academy in Wuxi was joined by the academies of the nearby Wujin and Yixing. Donglin men carried on politics not only through bureaucratic maneuverings but also through educated opinion; it involved building reputation and reporting of dreams.

Many of the academy's creators were among the mandarins who a few years previously had forced the Wanli Emperor to appoint his first-born son, Zhu Changluo (the future Taichang Emperor) as the heir to the throne, even though the emperor himself would rather have the throne go to Zhu Changxun (the emperor's son from his favorite concubine, Lady Zheng).

During the reign of the Tianqi Emperor, Donglin opposition to the eunuch Wei Zhongxian resulted in the closure of the academy in 1622 and the torture and execution of its head, Yang Lian, and five other members in 1624. The accession of the Chongzhen Emperor restored the fortunes of the Donglin faction. Later during Chongzhen's reign, Donglin partisans found themselves opposed to the Grand Secretary Wen Tiren, eventually arranging his dismissal in 1637.

The Donglin movement represented growth of the literati influence on the political life in late Imperial China. In this, it was inherited by the Suzhou-centered Fushe movement (復社) before the fall the Ming dynasty, and by the Changzhou School of Thought during the Qing. China's defeat in the Opium War (1839–42) prompted the revival of interest to the Donglin movement, a prominent instance of literati solidarity.
