= Gao Panlong =

Chinese official and philosopher (1562–1626)

- 高攀龍
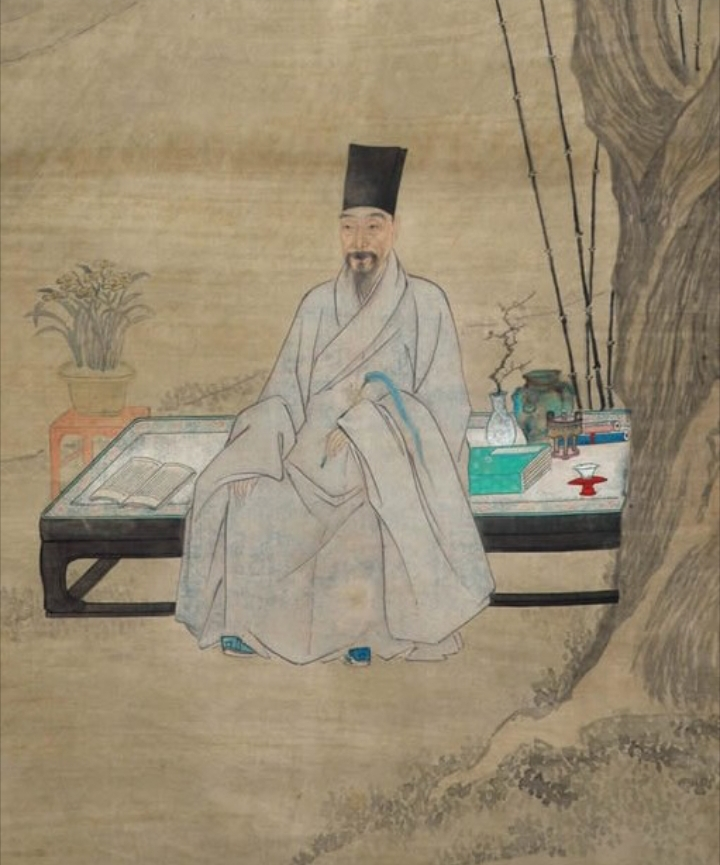

Left Censor-in-Chief
- In office 1624
- Monarch: Tianqi
- Preceded by: Sun Wei
- Succeeded by: Li Zongyan

Personal details
- Born: 13 August 1562 Wuxi, Jiangsu
- Died: 14 April 1626 (aged 63)
- Education: jinshi degree (1589)

Chinese name
- Traditional Chinese: 高攀龍
- Simplified Chinese: 高攀龙
Transcriptions
Standard Mandarin
- Hanyu Pinyin: Gāo Pānlóng

Gao Panlong (Note: Gao Panlong used the courtesy name Yuncong (雲從), later changed to Cunzhi (存之), and the art name Jingyi (景逸).) (13 August 1562 – 14 April 1626) was a Chinese Neo-Confucian philosopher and scholar-official during the Ming dynasty, and one of the leaders of the Donglin Academy and its associated movement.

== Biography ==
Gao Panlong was from Wuxi, located in present-day Jiangsu Province. He dedicated himself to studying the Confucian classics and took civil service examinations. In 1582, he passed the provincial examinations, and in 1589, he successfully passed the highest level of examinations, known as the palace examination, and was granted the rank of jinshi. He observed the mourning period for his adoptive father until 1591, at which point he embarked on a career in civil service.

In 1593, there was a conflict between opposition officials and the grand secretaries over the six-year evaluation of officials. Zhao Nanxing and later Gu Xiancheng lost their positions. Gao also faced consequences for his protests the following year and was transferred to the southern Chinese province of Guangdong. During this time, he had a spiritual awakening and realized that he and the world were one. He came to the conclusion that moral improvement was solely dependent on himself and had to come from within his own heart and mind (xin). After a few months in the south, he retired from civil service in 1595 and returned home to Wuxi. He followed Zhu Xi's principle of "half a day of book learning, half a day of meditation" in his studies. In 1603, he proposed to Gu the establishment of the Donglin Academy as a center for teaching and public debates on philosophy. Gao actively participated in its operation and took over as leader after Gu's death in 1612. He remained at the helm of the academy until its dissolution in 1625.

Philosophically, Gao was a member of the Cheng-Chu school and was also influenced by Zhang Zai and Wang Yangming. He emphasized the importance of understanding the principle through gewu zhizhi, or "expanding knowledge through the investigation of things", and placed a strong emphasis on meditation (jingzuo). While he agreed with Wang's belief that the investigation of things (gewu) should focus on one's own heart/mind, he criticized Wang's conclusion about the innate nature of moral knowledge as being incorrect. Gao believed that both meditation and reading books were important, but he believed that the main focus of investigation should be one's own inner self and heart/mind, rather than external objects like plants and trees, in the tradition of Xue Xuan. His teachings placed a greater emphasis on respect (jing, 敬) and tranquility (jing, 靜) rather than knowledge of the world. Through meditation, Gao aimed to achieve harmony with the entire universe. He shared Wang's belief in seeking the principle (li) of morality within one's own heart/mind, but he rejected the interpretation of Wang's followers who saw "innate knowledge of goodness" as a justification for individualism. Gao's goal was to reestablish moral effort (gongfu) as a means of self-improvement and to reject the popular belief that goodness is naturally present in the heart/mind, or that the heart/mind is inherently beyond good and evil.

He not only preached his teachings, but also put them into practice by establishing a charity fund to assist the poor and needy. Additionally, he taught at the Donglin Academy and other academies in Jiangnan, meditated, and lived a morally upright life. In 1620, when the Tianqi Emperor ascended the throne, he accepted a position in Beijing alongside other followers of the Donglin movement who had also been in opposition since the mid-1590s (such as Zou Yuanpiao, Feng Chongwu, and Zhao Nanxing). He played a role in the establishment of the Shoushan Academy in Beijing in 1622. He resigned in 1623 and returned to Wuxi. He was then appointed as vice minister of justice and later became left censor-in-chief in the auntum of 1624. His time in office was short-lived as the supporters of the Donglin movement clashed with the eunuch Wei Zhongxian's group, resulting in Gao and other officials being dismissed from their positions in the winter of 1624/1625 (including Minister of Perdonnel Zhao Nanxing, Grand Secretary Han Guang, Hanlin academician Miao Changqi, and others).

In the summer of 1625, a number of Donglin activists were imprisoned and ultimately died while in prison. The following year, an arrest warrant was issued for another group of Donglin activists, among them Gao. Gao, however, received word of the impending arrest and chose to take his own life by drowning himself in a nearby pond in an attempt to evade capture.
