= Gu Xiancheng =

Chinese bureaucrat (1550–1612)

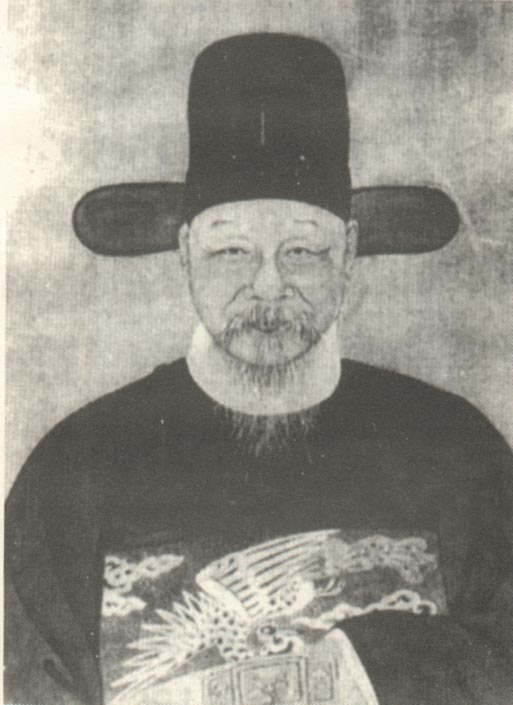
Portrait of Gu Xiancheng

Gu Xiancheng (Chinese: 顧憲成; pinyin: Gù Xiànchéng; 1550–1612) was a Ming dynasty Chinese bureaucrat and educator who founded the Donglin movement.

He was born in Jiangnan, to a mercantile family, and from an early age was tutored in the Chinese classics. He quickly rejected the Yaojiang school of Wang Yangming, favouring the strong moral dichotomy of earlier Song philosophers such as Zhu Xi. A student of Xue Yingqi, he held office as Grand Secretary in the Imperial Court.

Together with his brother and his student Gao Panlong he rebuilt the Donglin ("East Forest") Academy in 1604, in the town of Wuxi.

The Donglin Charter was based on Zhu Xi's Articles of the White Deer Grotto, and incorporated quotations from a number of Confucian classics. Gu required prospective entrants to have four key qualities, which he called the Four Essentials: students had to consider their fundamental nature, show firm resolve, respect the Classics and scrutinise their own motivation.

Gu's Academy quickly attracted a large student base, and became a rallying point for dissent and criticism of the government, in the form of the Donglin movement. The Academy was strongly critical of the notorious eunuch Wei Zhongxian, and as a result of Wei's persecution it was shut down in 1622; it reopened some years later after the eunuch's death.
