= Tianshou Mountain =

Mountain in Beijing, China

Tianshou Mountain (simplified Chinese: 天寿山; traditional Chinese: 天壽山; pinyin: Tiānshòu Shān) is located in the north of Changping District, Beijing. It was originally named Huangtu Mountain (黃土山), also known as Dongshan (東山), or Dongzhazi Mountain (東榨子山). In 1409, the Yongle Emperor ordered the construction of imperial tombs on the mountain, hence the name change to Tianshou Mountain. From the Yongle Emperor onwards, all Ming emperors (except for the Jingtai Emperor, who was buried in Jinshan, now known as Yuquan Mountain) were buried in Tianshou Mountain, making it the location of the Ming tombs.

List of Ming emperors and empresses buried in Tianshou Mountain
Tomb	Emperor	Empress
Chang Mausoleum (長陵)	Yongle Emperor	Empress Renxiaowen
Xian Mausoleum (獻陵)	Hongxi Emperor	Empress Chengxiaozhao
Jing Mausoleum (景陵)	Xuande Emperor	Empress Xiaogongzhang
Yu Mausoleum (裕陵)	Emperor Yingzong of Ming	Empress Xiaozhuangrui, Empress Xiaosu
Mao Mausoleum (茂陵)	Chenghua Emperor	Empress Xiaozhenchun, Empress Xiaomu, Empress Xiaohui
Tai Mausoleum (泰陵)	Hongzhi Emperor	Empress Xiaochengjing
Kang Mausoleum (康陵)	Zhengde Emperor	Empress Xiaojingyi
Yong Mausoleum (永陵)	Jiajing Emperor	Empress Xiaojiesu, Empress Xiaolie, Empress Xiaoke
Zhao Mausoleum	Longqing Emperor	Empress Xiaoyizhuang, Empress Xiao'an, Empress Xiaoding
Ding Mausoleum	Wanli Emperor	Empress Xiaoduanxian, Empress Xiaojing
Qing Mausoleum (慶陵)	Taichang Emperor	Empress Xiaoyuanzhen, Empress Xiaohe, Empress Xiaochun
De Mausoleum (德陵)	Tianqi Emperor	Empress Xiao'aizhe
Si Mausoleum (思陵)	Chongzhen Emperor	Empress Xiaojielie
