= Empress Chen =

Empress Chen (陳皇后) may refer to one of the following Chinese empresses:

- Empress Chen Jiao (empress 141 BC – 130 BC), Han dynasty empress
- Empress Chen Yueyi (565?–650?), Northern Zhou dynasty empress
- Empress Chen Jinfeng (893–935), Min empress
- Empress Xiaojiesu (1508–1528), Ming dynasty empress
- Empress Xiaoan (d. 1596), Ming dynasty empress

== See also ==
- Empress Zhen (disambiguation)
