= Jeon =

Jeon may refer to:

- Jeon (Korean surname)
- Jeon (food), a Korean pancake
- Jeon or chŏn, a subunit of various currencies of the Korean peninsula, including:
  - North Korean won
  - South Korean won (1945–1953)
  - The former Korean won
  - The former Korean yang

== See also ==
- Jeonju, North Jeolla Province, South Korea
- Jen (disambiguation)
- Zhen (disambiguation)
