= Empress Xiaoyi =

Empress Xiaoyi may refer to:

- Xiao Wenshou (343–423), empress dowager of Liu Song, stepmother of Liu Yu (Emperor Wu)
- Empress Dowager Xiaoyi (Ming dynasty) (1397–1462), mother of the Jingtai Emperor
- Empress Xiaoyizhuang (1530–1558), wife of the Longqing Emperor
- Empress Xiaoyiren (died 1689), wife of the Kangxi Emperor
- Empress Xiaoyichun (1727–1775), concubine of the Qianlong Emperor
