= Chenai =

Chenai may refer to:

- Chennai, a city in India
- Chenai (Thessaly), an ancient city-state of Thessaly, Greece
