= Figurine Lantern =

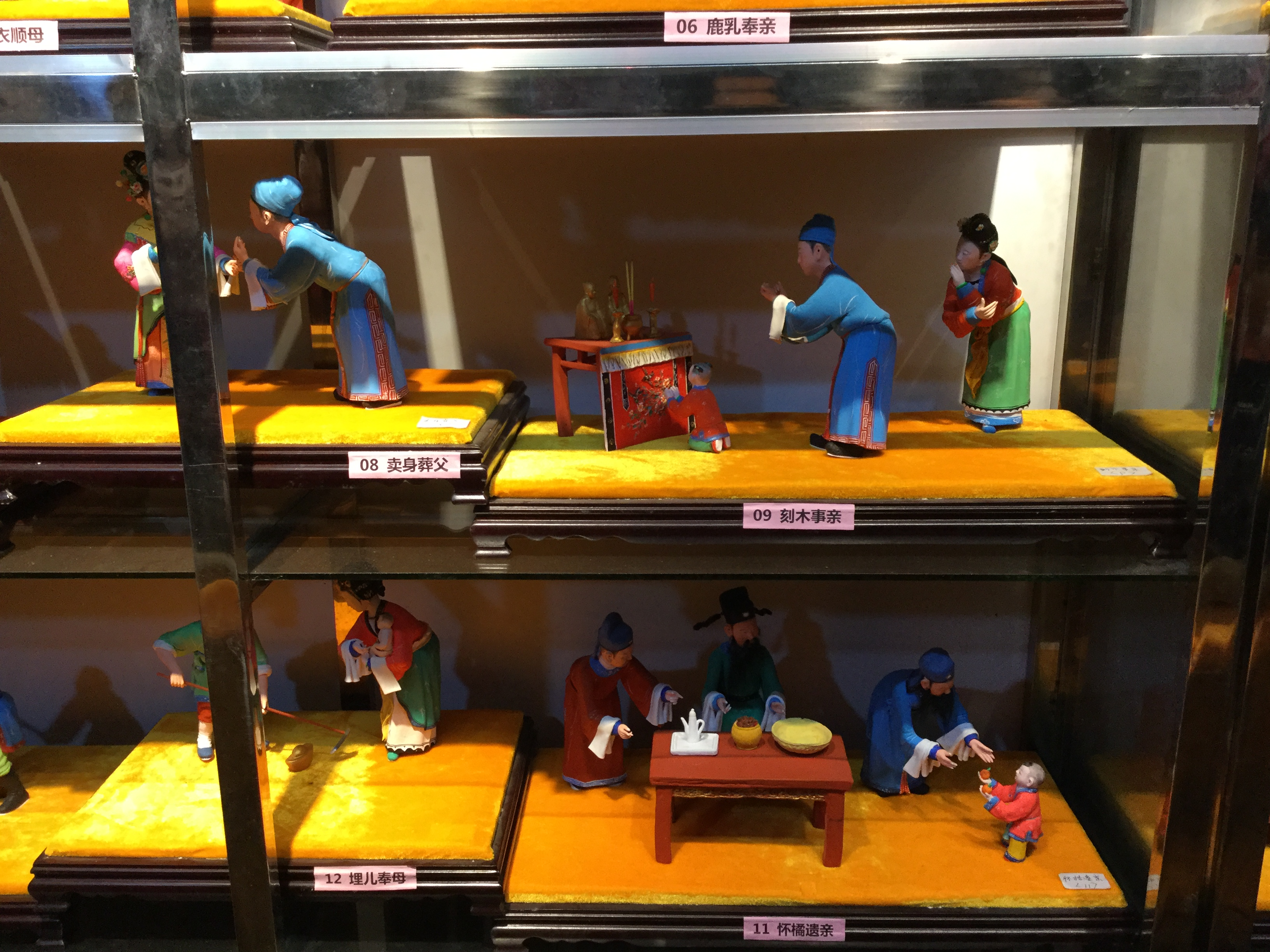
Figurine Lantern

Figurine Lantern (Traditional Chinese: 翁仔燈. Simplified Chinese: 翁仔灯; Teochew: Ang1 Gian2 Deng1; lit. doll lantern) is a type of traditional Teochew decorative lantern originating from Jieyang. Its characteristic is that small clay figurines are carved into the shape of dolls and painted with brightly colored clothes. These figures are placed in carved wooden lantern cabinets to create screen lanterns depicting historical or theatrical characters. They have a history of over 400 years, dating back to the Longqing era of the Ming Dynasty.

== Folk custom ==
The figurine lamps are closely related to the Lantern Festival and represent the pinnacle of Lantern Festival celebrations in the Teochew culture and Chaoshan region. In Jieyang City, from the eleventh to the sixteenth day of the first lunar month every year, the Pomenlouzheng (破门楼郑) located on the north side of Jinxianmen (进贤门) in Rongcheng is brightly lit, with lanterns and decorations all the way from the alley entrance inwards. Inside the building, colorful lanterns, flower lanterns, and palace lanterns are hung, and dozens of lantern cabinets are arranged on both sides, displaying sets of exquisitely crafted miniature clay opera‑scene figurines (翁仔屏).

A local saying goes: "Watch the figurine lanterns and carry the white boy" (看翁仔燈抱白弟). It expresses a wish for prosperity in the new year — both in wealth and in descendants.

The Figurine Lantern, which has a history of more than 300 years, is open to the public from the 11th to the 15th day of the first lunar month (Lantern Festival) every year.

During the week-long carnival, thousands of locals and tourists gather to view the newly made figurine lanterns. In the Teochew dialect, the word for lantern (pronounced as Dêng1) sounds exactly like the word for a male descendant (Chinese: 丁; Teochew: Dêng1). Therefore, "watching lanterns" is symbolically associated with "adding children to the family" (Chinese: 添丁; Teochew: Tin1 Dêng1).

== Legend ==
According to local tradition, in the early Ming dynasty a renowned geomancer known by the sobriquet Louse Immortal (Chinese: 蝨母仙; Teochew: sag4 bho2 siêng1), whose personal name was He Yeyun (何野云), wandered to Jieyang. The Zheng lineage of Rongcheng received him with great hospitality and invited him to design a gatehouse for their clan. He Yeyun planned a three‑courtyard structure (三进厅). Because the site fell under the Li (離) position in geomantic calculation—and Li, in the Eight Trigrams, corresponds to fire—the central hall could not be roofed over. The space had to remain open to allow the fire‑energy to rise. Because the central hall of the structure has no roof in the middle, the structure looks uncompleted, it is called Pomenlouzheng (lit. Zheng's dilapidated gatehouse) by the locals. However, from a modern perspective, the central hall is not covered, forming an open space that is conducive to air circulation and natural lighting.

Starting from the Longqing reign of the Ming dynasty, the Zheng clan's gatehouse established the custom of setting up figurine lanterns inside the building every first lunar month, praying for prosperity in both wealth and descendants, and for happiness and good fortune. This tradition continues to this day.

== Intangible cultural heritage ==
In 2017, the Rongcheng Pomenglou Zheng Figurine Lantern Custom (榕城破门楼郑翁仔灯习俗) was inscribed as part of the fifth batch of Guangdong Province's Representative Items of Intangible Cultural Heritage.
