= Xiaojing (disambiguation) =

The Xiaojing, or Classic of Filial Piety, is a Confucian classic treatise giving advice on filial piety

Xiaojing may also refer to:

- Xiao'erjing, or Xiaojing, practice of writing Sinitic languages or the Dungan language in the Arabic script
- Emperor Xiaojing of Eastern Wei (524–552), emperor of the Chinese/Xianbei dynasty Eastern Wei
- Empress Dowager Xiaojing, consort of the Ming dynasty's Wanli Emperor
