= Feng Bao =

16th-century Chinese eunuch

Feng Bao (Note: Chinese: 馮保; pinyin: Féng Bǎo) (Note: Feng Bao used the courtesy name Yongting (永亭) and the art name Shuanglin (雙林).) (fl. 1567–1583) was a Chinese eunuch, the highest-ranking during the minority of the Ming emperor Wanli. He was one of the three most influential figures in the administration of the empire during the first decade of the Emperor's reign, along with Grand Secretary Zhang Juzheng and Empress Dowager Li. Feng was known for his education and competence as a statesman. After Zhang's death in 1582, he lost the emperor's support and was demoted to a lower position in Nanjing in early 1583.

== Biography ==
Feng Bao was born during the Ming dynasty in Shenzhou in northern China's Hebei province. As a child, he attended the Neishutang, a school for eunuchs located within the Forbidden City. There, he received instruction from scholars of the Hanlin Academy. He had a passion for literature, was skilled in playing the flute, and excelled in calligraphy.

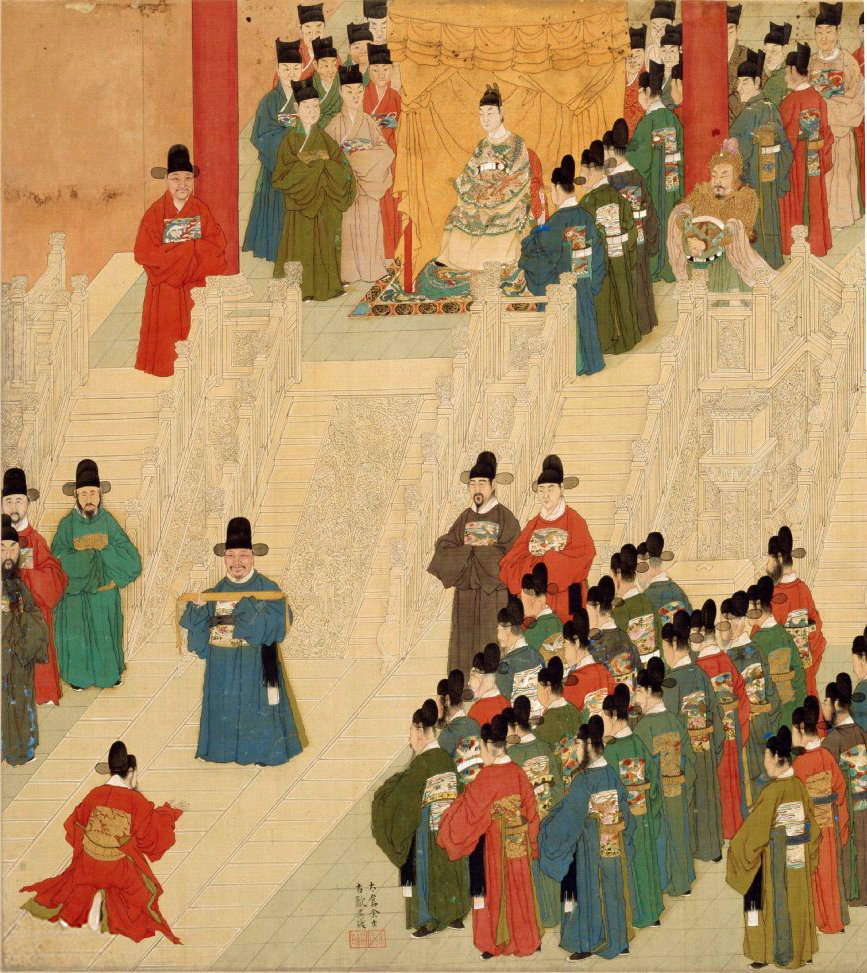
The young Wanli Emperor holding an imperial audience, with court eunuchs standing beside and behind the throne, c. 1577

In 1538, Feng began working as a scribe for the Directorate of Ceremonial, a position he held for 15 years. In 1553, he transferred to the seals office, and in 1560, the Jiajing Emperor appointed him deputy director (sīlǐ bǐngbǐ tàijiàn 司禮秉筆太監) of the Directorate of Ceremonial. Along with three or four eunuch colleagues, he oversaw the compilation and transmission of imperial edicts. In 1567, the newly crowned Longqing Emperor chose him as his personal secretary and also appointed him director of the Eastern Depot, which was responsible for the eunuch secret service and the Imperial Stables. In 1572, shortly before his death, the Longqing Emperor promoted Feng to director (sīlǐ zhǎngyìn tàijiàn 司禮掌印太監) of the Directorate of Ceremonial, making him the highest-ranking eunuch in the Forbidden City. He also continued to oversee the Eastern Depot. The Wanli Emperor then ascended the throne at the age of ten. He held great respect for three individuals: his mother Lady Li, Grand Secretary Zhang Juzheng, and Feng, all of whom worked closely together.

Feng was known for his efficiency, capability, and competence. Following Zhang's death in 1582, he faced criticism from the censors. In early 1583, he was removed from his positions and demoted to a lower-ranking post in Nanjing. Additionally, eight of his closest subordinate eunuchs were also dismissed. His property and that of his relatives were seized. Furthermore, his brother and adopted son, who held high positions in the central military commissions, were imprisoned and ultimately died.

American historian Shih-shan Henry Tsai noted that, despite his love for history and efforts to avoid the mistakes of his predecessors, Feng ultimately lost his power after sixteen years in office. His downfall was brought about by complaints from fellow eunuchs, who reported to the emperor that Feng had grown too powerful. Feng was then replaced as head of the Eastern Depot by Zhang Jing, who held the position until 1590 when he was dismissed due to a loss of the emperor's confidence.

According to Tsai's monograph on Ming eunuchs, Feng died in 1583 after only a few months in Nanjing. In contrast, Michela Fontana, the biographer of Matteo Ricci, and American historian Ronnie Po-Chia Hsia both state that Ricci met Feng in 1599. At the time, Feng was still one of the most influential figures in Nanjing at the age of seventy.
