= Empress Xiaojing =

Empress Xiaojing may refer to:

- Empress Wang Zhi (孝景皇后) (173BC – 126BC), wife of Emperor Jing of Han
- Empress Xiaojing (孝靖皇后) (1565–1611), biological mother of the Ming dynasty Taichang Emperor
- Empress Xiaojingxian (孝敬憲皇后) (1679–1731), wife of the Qing dynasty Yongzheng Emperor
- Empress Xiaojingcheng (孝静成皇后) (1812–1855), imperial noble consort of the Qing dynasty Daoguang Emperor
