= Chen =

Chen or Ch'en may refer to:

== People ==
- Chen (surname) (陳 / 陈), a common Chinese surname
- Chen (singer) (born 1992), member of the South Korean-Chinese boy band EXO
- Chen Chen (poet) (born 1989), Chinese-American poet
- חֵן (Khen), a Hebrew first name or surname:
  - Hen Lippin (born 1965), former Israeli basketball player
  - Chen Kugel (born 1962), Israeli pathologist who did an autopsy on Yahya Sinwar
  - Chen Reiss (born 1979), Israeli operatic soprano
  - Ronen Chen (born 1965), Israeli fashion designer

== Historical states ==
- Chen (state) (c. 1045 BC–479 BC), a Zhou dynasty state in present-day Anhui and Henan
- Chen (Thessaly), a city-state in ancient Thessaly, Greece
- Chen Commandery, a commandery in China from Han dynasty to Sui dynasty
- Chen dynasty (557–589), a Chinese southern dynasty during the Northern and Southern dynasties period

== Businesses and organizations ==
- Council for Higher Education in Newark (CHEN)
- Chen (Hebrew: ח״ן), acronym in Hebrew for the Women's Army Corps (חיל נשים, khayil nashim) a defunct organization in the Israeli Defence Force
- Chen, a brand name used by Mexican frozen food distributor Sigma Alimentos

== Other uses ==
- Chen, a genus of geese which is now generally included in Anser
- Chen's notation, a graphical entity-relationship model devised by Peter Chen
- Chen-style taijiquan, a Chinese martial art created by the Chen family
- Chen, a character from the Touhou Project video game series
- Chen, a playable panda character in the video game Heroes of the Storm

== See also ==
- Cheng (disambiguation)
- Khen (disambiguation)
- Zhen (disambiguation) (Note that Chinese names transcribed Zhen in the modern Pinyin system were transcribed Chen in the older Wade–Giles system)
