= Empress Zhen =

Empress Zhen may refer to:

- Empress Zhen (Cao Fang) (甄皇后, personal name unknown) (died 251), wife of Cao Fang of Cao Wei
- Lady Zhen (甄夫人; 183–221), wife of Cao Pi, posthumously Empress Wenzhao of Wei
- Empress Zhen (Liao dynasty) (甄皇后; died 951), wife of Emperor Shizong of Liao
- Empress Dowager Ci'an (1837–1881), also known as Empress Zhen (貞皇后), married to the Xianfeng Emperor of Qing

== See also ==
- Zhen (disambiguation)
