= Khen (disambiguation) =

The khen is a mouth organ of Southeast Asia.

Khen may also refer to:

- Khen dynasty, a mediaeval dynasty of Assam, India
- Khen Lampert (born 1957), Israeli educator and philosopher
- Khen Shish (born 1970), Israeli artist
- Koo Luam Khen (born 1951), Malaysian football player
- Khen (DJ), Israeli DJ and music producer

== See also ==
- KHEN-LP, a radio station of Colorado, the US
- Chen (disambiguation)
