= Zhao Mausoleum (Ming dynasty) =

Mausoleum in China

Ming Zhaoling
- 明昭陵
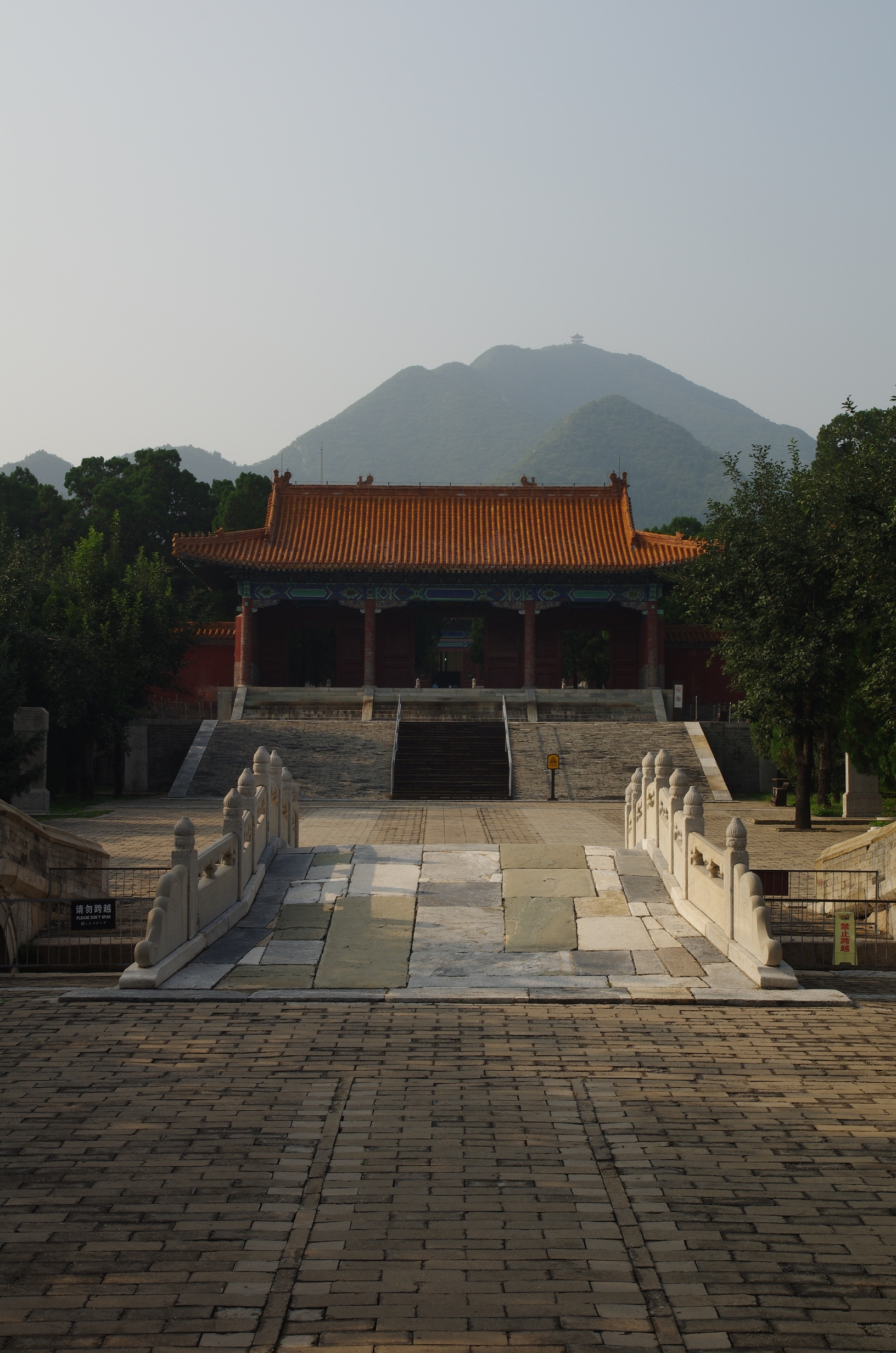
- Ling'en Gate of the Mausoleum
- Interactive map of the Ming Zhaoling area

General information
- Location: Changping District, Beijing, China
- Coordinates: 40°17′26″N 116°12′40″E

The Zhao Mausoleum (Chinese: 明昭陵; pinyin: Míng Zhāolíng) is a mausoleum in China where the Longqing Emperor was buried. The mausoleum is one of the thirteen imperial tombs at Ming tombs in Changping District 45 km north of central Beijing.

The Longqing Emperor was the 13th emperor of the Ming dynasty (1368–1644), reigning from 1566 until his death in 1572. He was buried in the Zhao Mausoleum, one of the thirteen imperial tombs in the Ming tombs complex. His first wife, Empress Li, who died in 1558, was also interred at the mausoleum. Later, the emperor's two other wives, Empress Xiao'an and Empress Xiaoding, were also laid to rest there.

The Zhao Mausoleum is the only tomb in the Ming tombs complex that has undergone a significant renovation, which took place in 1980. It was opened to the public in 1990 and is one of only three tombs in the complex that are accessible to tourists, along with the Chang and Ding Mausoleums.

The mausoleum was originally built as a tomb for the Jiajing Emperor's parents, but for various reasons, the Wanli Emperor chose to bury his father, the Longqing Emperor, there instead. The construction of the mausoleum was completed in 1573, and it follows a similar architectural style to other Ming tombs. The complex is centered around a continuous geometric axis starting with a stele in a pavilion, leading to the Ling'en Gate and the Ling'en Hall (隆恩殿), which was used for paying respects to the Longqing Emperor by successive emperors. The Minglou Tower is the next building, enclosed by a square castle. This castle then connects to the Precious Castle (宝城), a circular wall that encloses the burial mound. The mound itself is an artificial circular structure made of packed earth, beneath which lies the underground palace where the deceased are laid to rest. Similar to the Eastern Qing tombs and Western Qing tombs, the Ming tombs also feature a courtyard with a sacred kitchen and storeroom located near the entrance to the tomb. However, the Zhao Mausoleum is the only Ming tomb where these buildings have been preserved. The entire complex covers an area of 34,000 square meters.

The name Zhaoling has been used for other Chinese imperial tombs as well. The Tang dynasty Emperor Taizong (died 649) is buried in Zhaoling, located northwest of Xi'an, while the Qing dynasty emperor Hong Taiji (died 1643) is buried in Zhaoling in Shenyang, Liaoning.

== Gallery ==
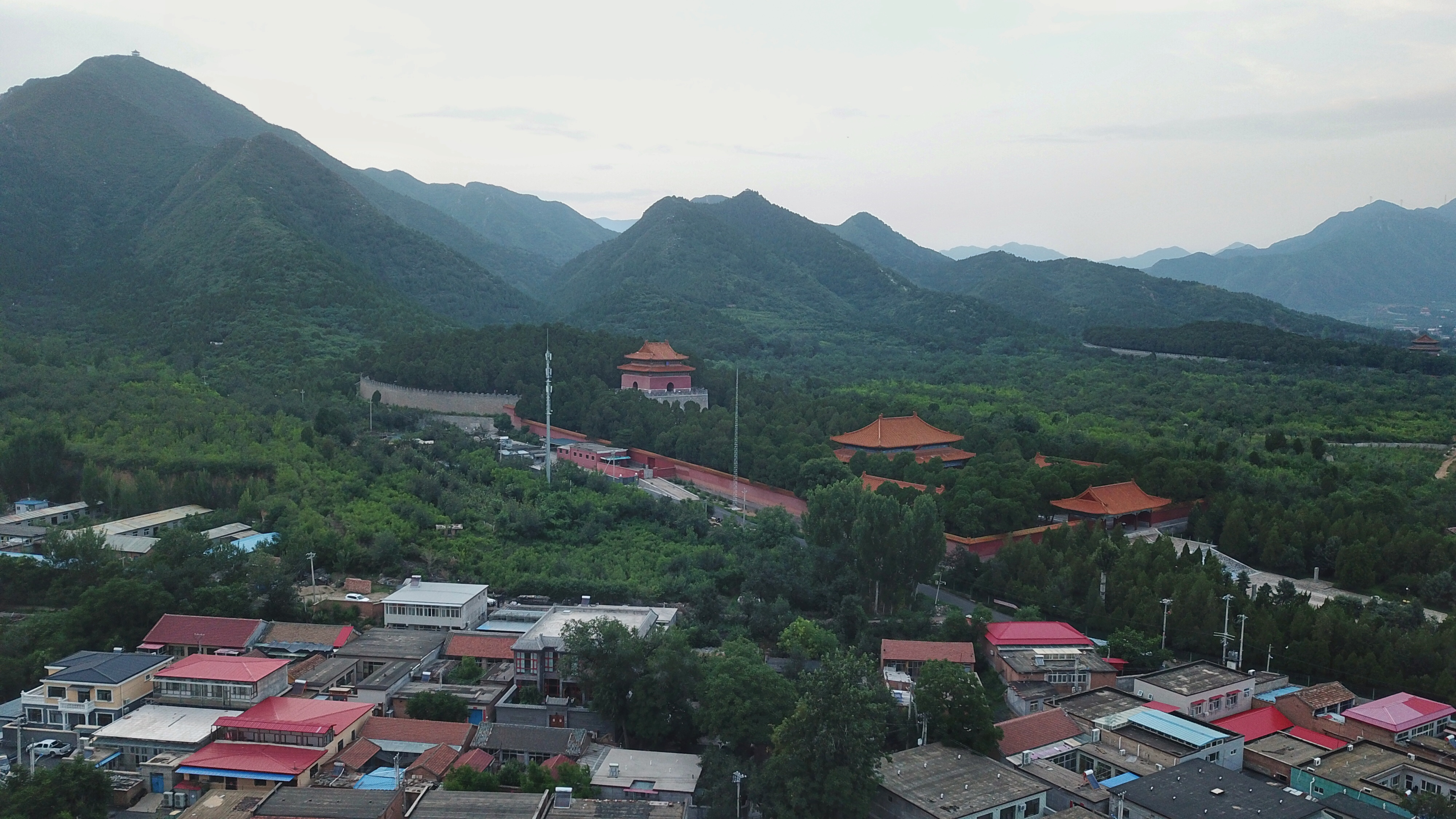
Side-view of the mausoleum (Bird's-eye view from Zhaoling Village)

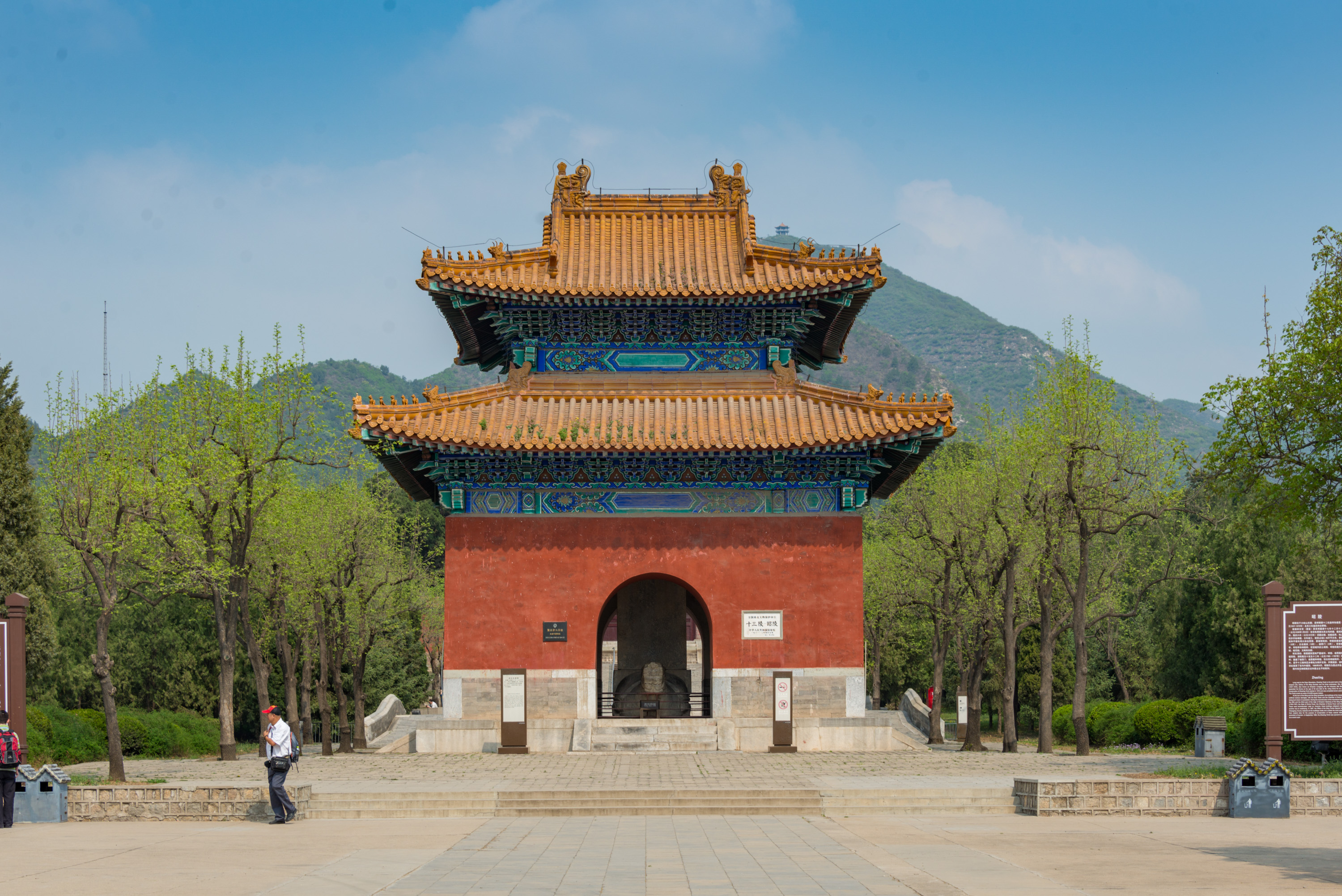
Shengong Shengde Stele Pavilion

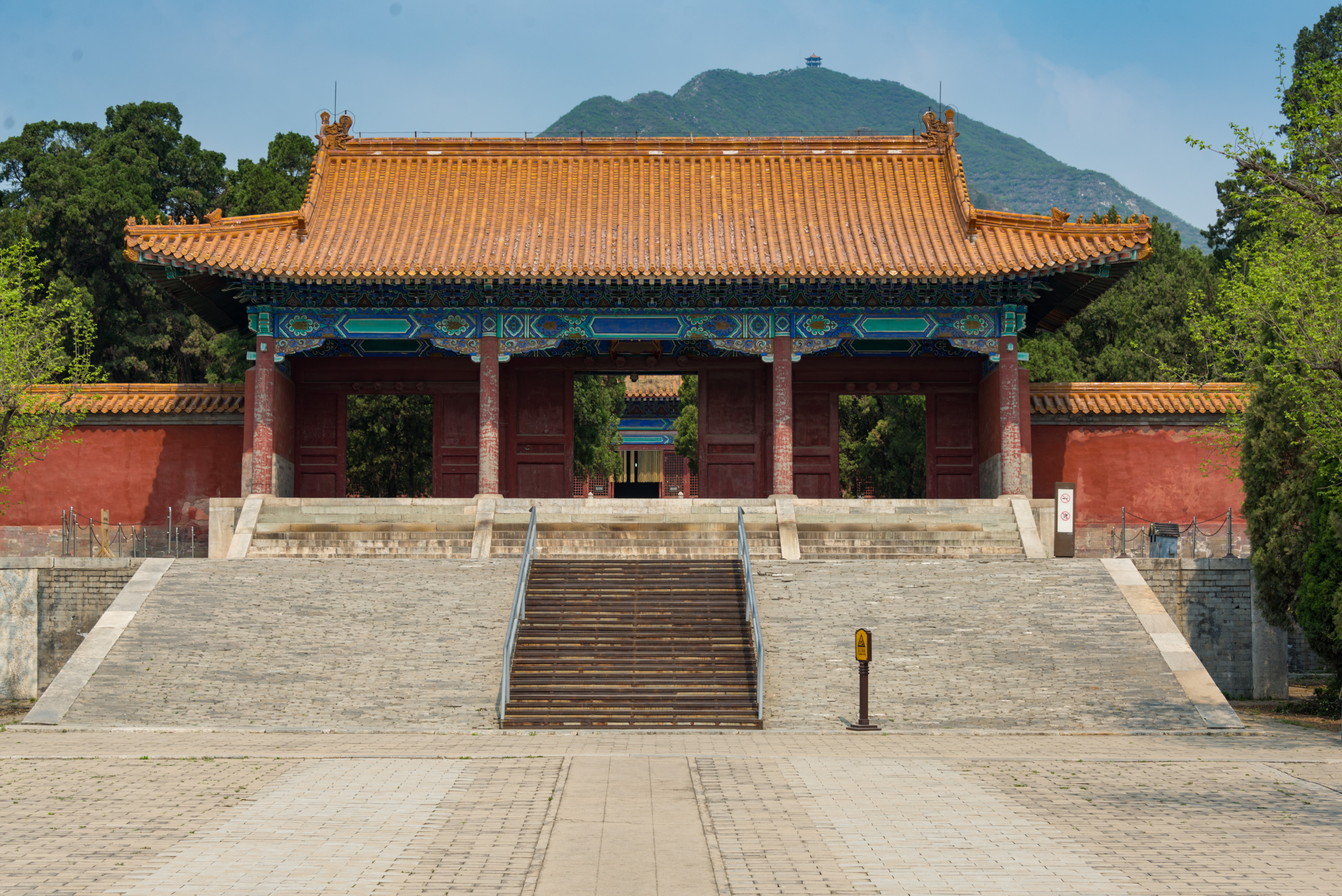
Ling'en Gate

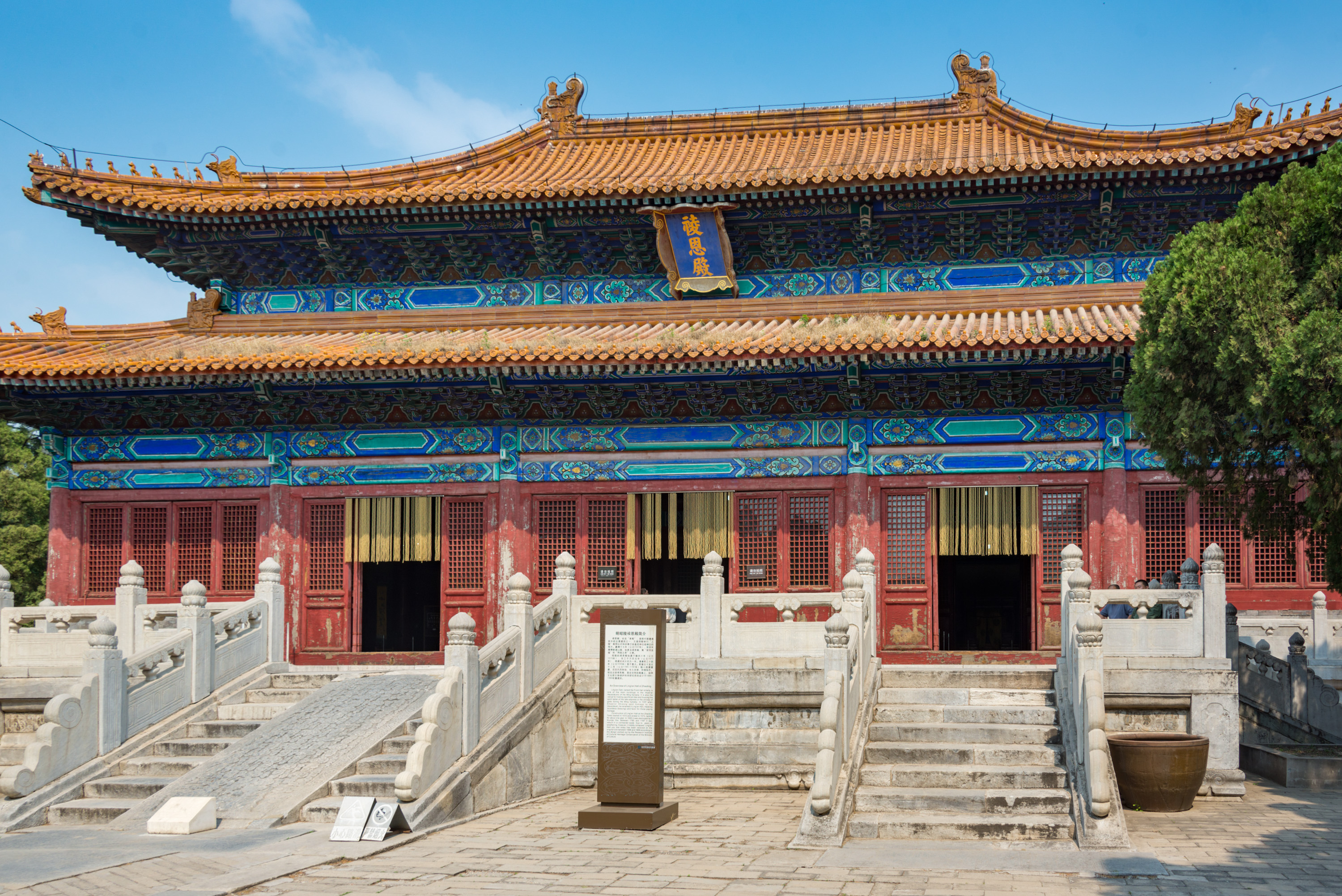
Ling'en Hall

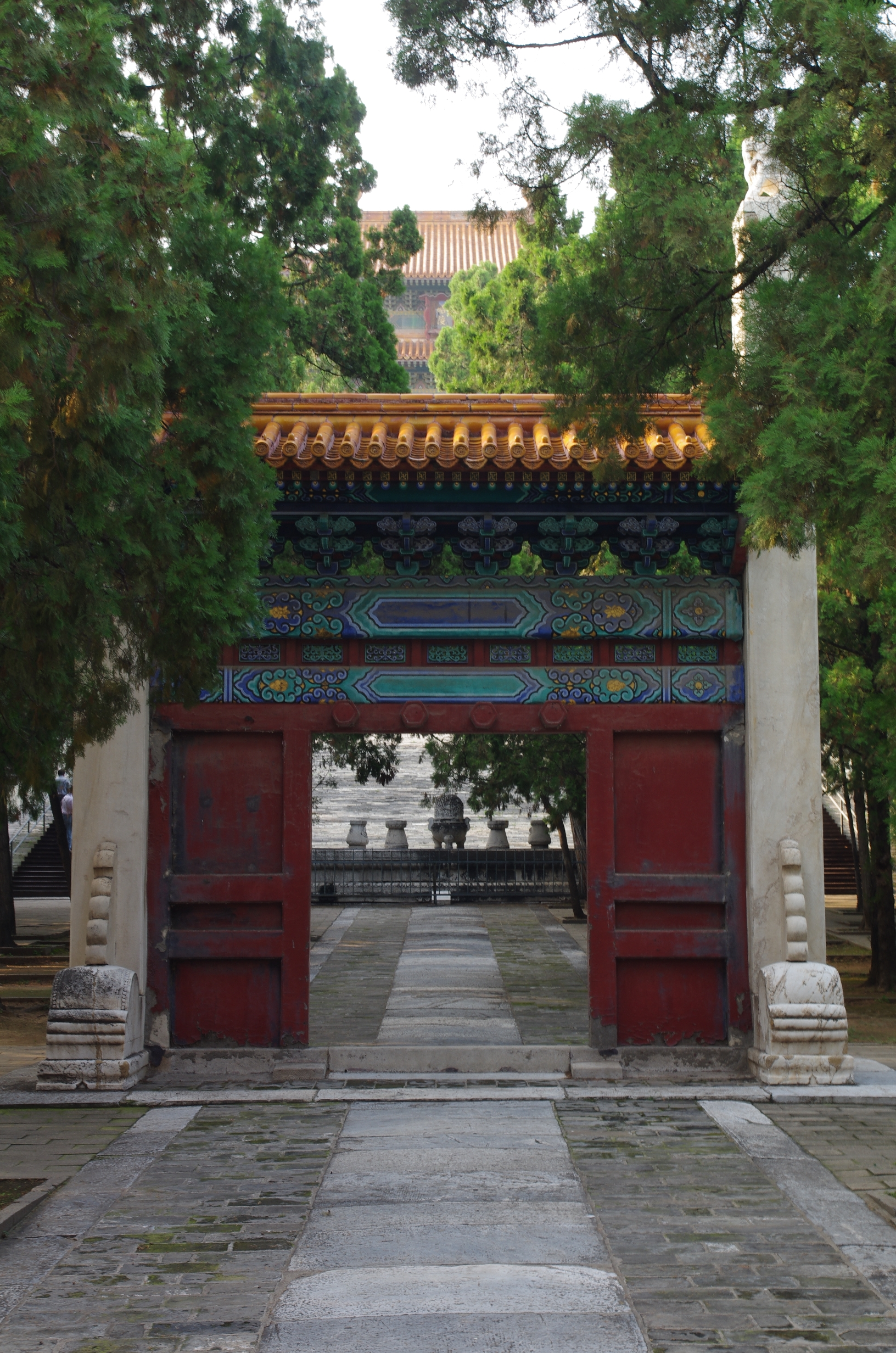
Lingxing Gate

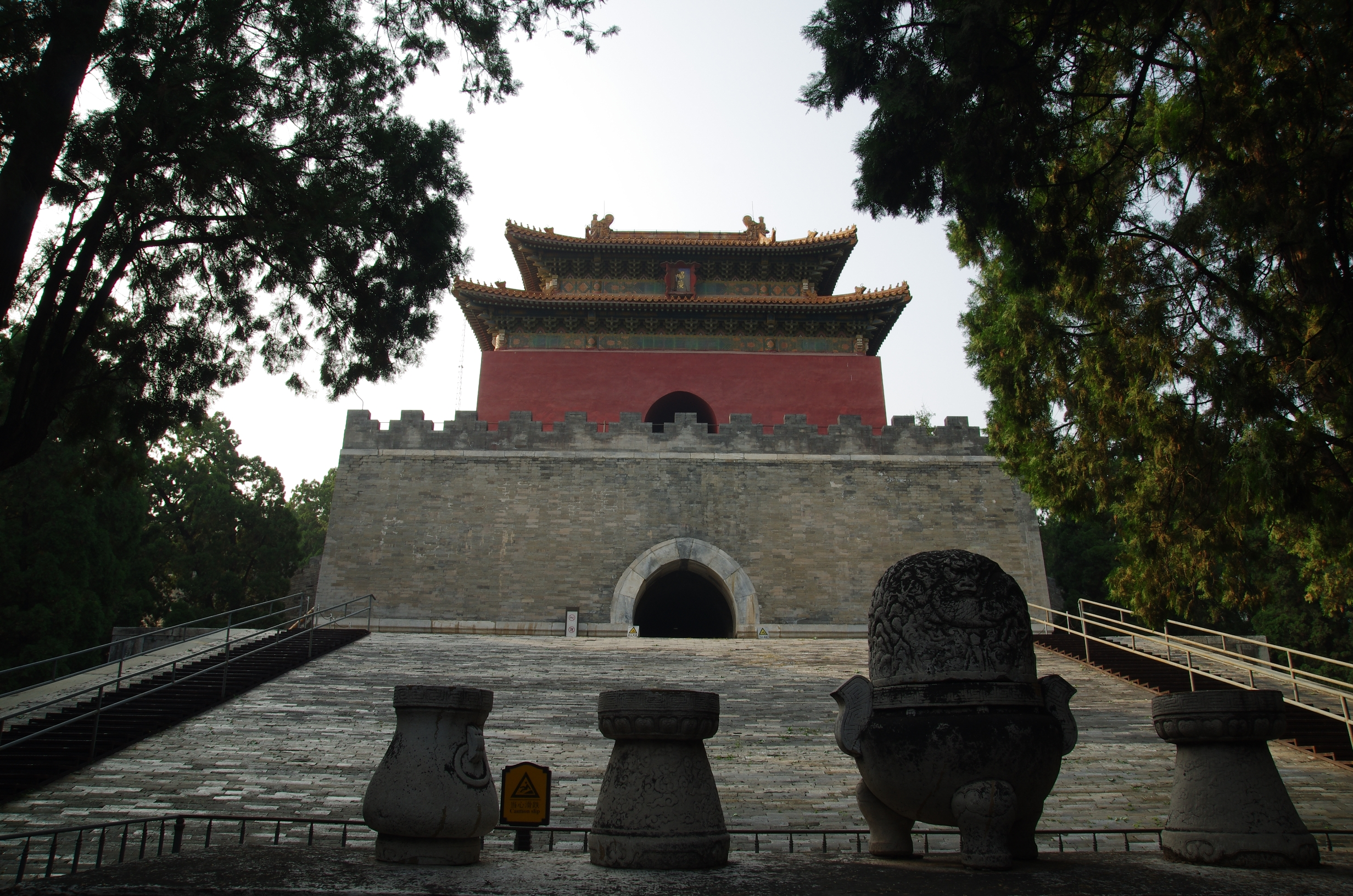
Minglou Tower

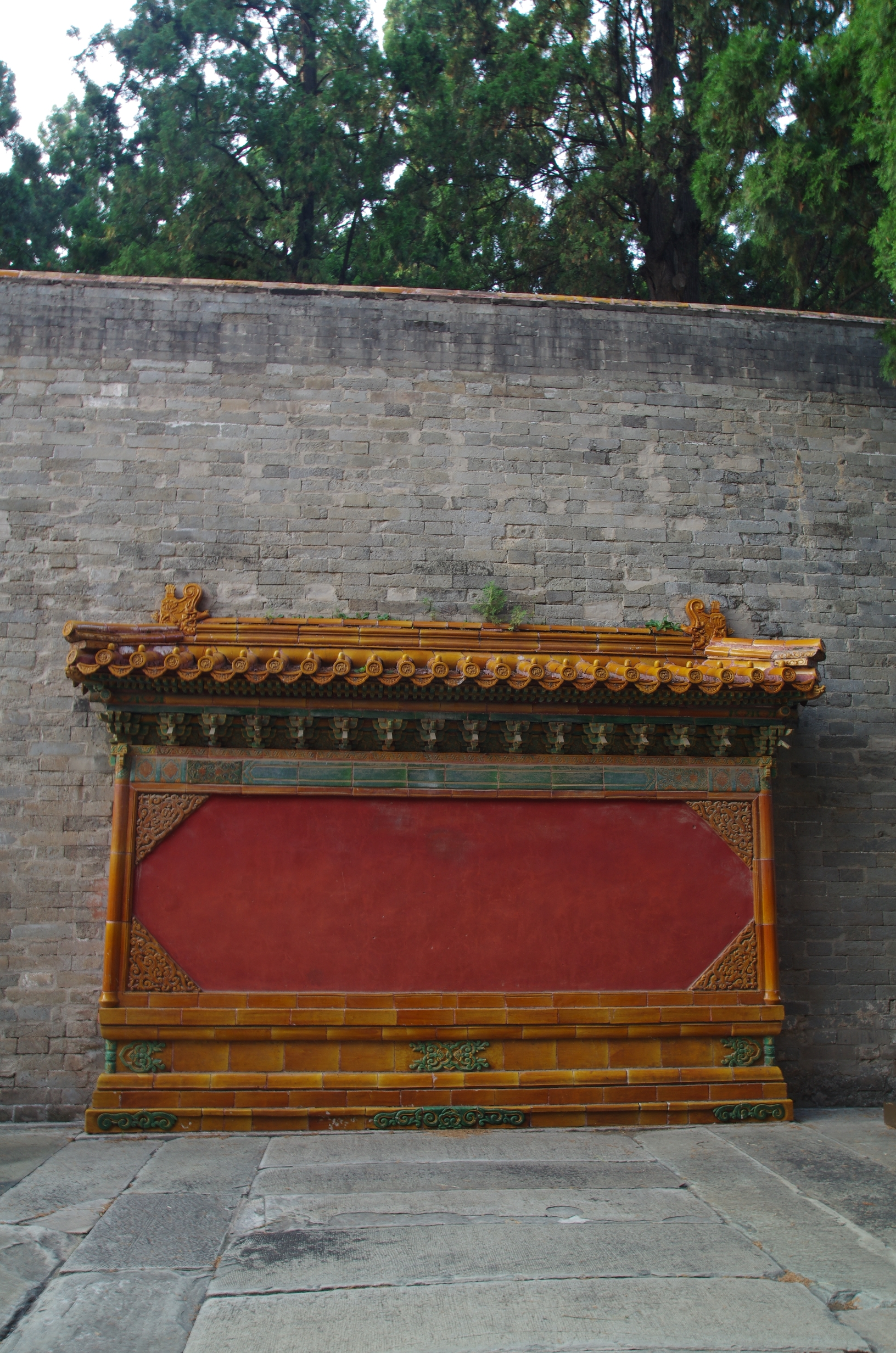
Precious Castle's Glazed Shadow Wall (琉璃影壁)
