= Empress Dowager Xiaoding =

Chinese empress dowager (1545–1614)

Empress Dowager Xiaoding 孝定皇太后
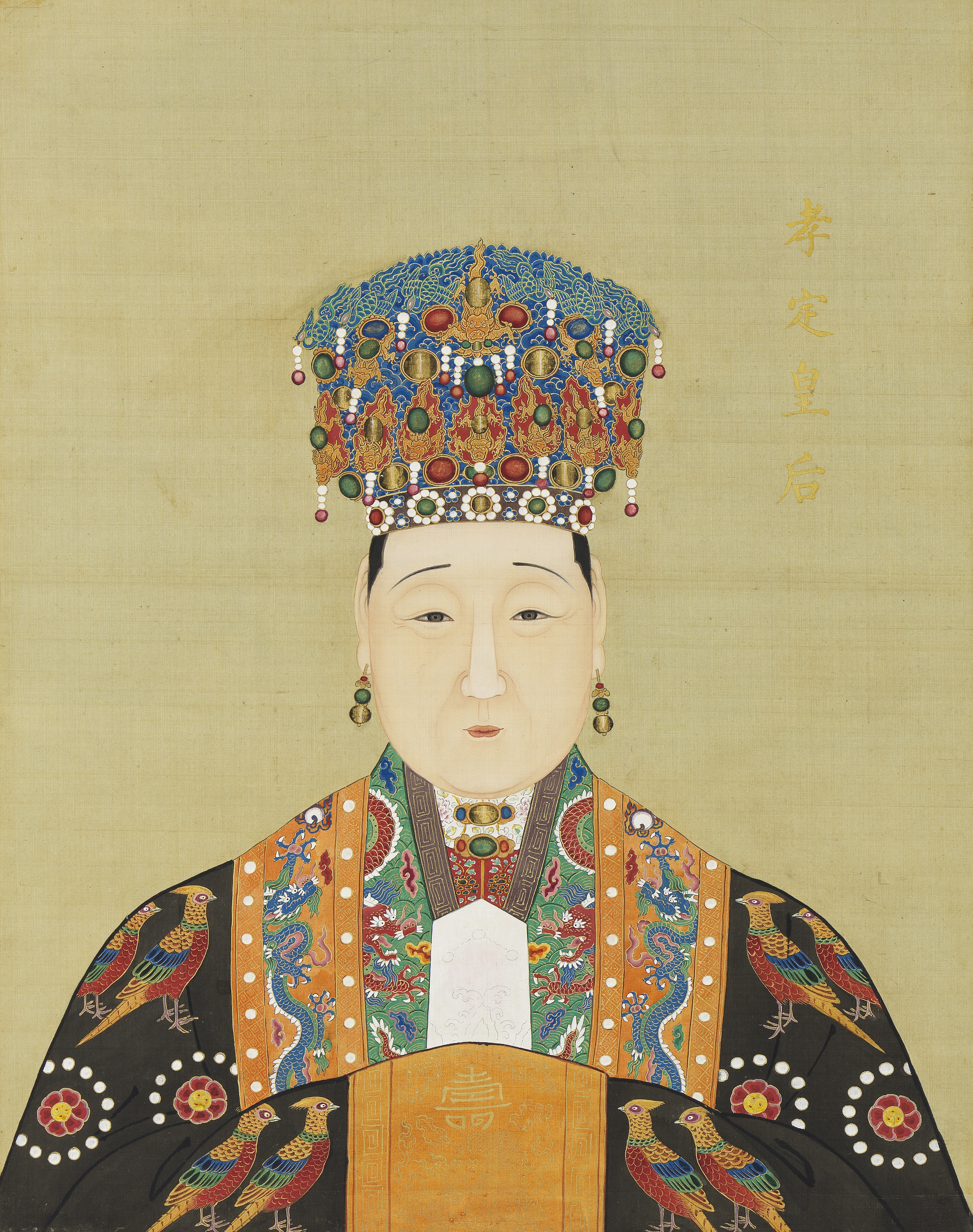

Empress dowager of the Ming dynasty
- Tenure: 5 July 1572 – 1614
- Predecessor: Empress Dowager Zhaosheng
- Born: 1545
- Died: 1614 (aged 68–69)
- Burial: Zhao Mausoleum
- Spouse: Longqing Emperor (m. 1560; died 1572)
- Issue Detail: Wanli Emperor
Posthumous name
- Empress Dowager Xiaoding Zhenchun Qinren Duansu Bitian Zuosheng (Note: Simplified Chinese: 孝定贞纯钦仁端肃弼天祚圣皇太后; traditional Chinese: 孝定貞純欽仁端肅弼天祚聖皇太后)
- Clan: Li
- Father: Li Wei

Chinese name
- Chinese: 孝定皇太后
Transcriptions
Standard Mandarin
- Hanyu Pinyin: Xiàodìng Huángtàihòu

Empress Dowager Xiaoding (1545–1614), of the Li clan, was a Chinese empress dowager of the Ming dynasty. She was one of the concubines of the Longqing Emperor and the mother of his successor, the Wanli Emperor.

After the Longqing Emperor's death, Empress Dowager Li became the regent and de facto ruler in place of the underage Wanli Emperor. She oversaw the Emperor's education while Grand Secretary Zhang Juzheng and the eunuch Feng Bao managed the state administration. Although she did not typically involve herself in politics, she did intervene in the dispute over the appointment of the heir to the throne, where she supported the rights of the Emperor's eldest son. Instead of focusing on politics, she devoted herself to religion. She was a devout Buddhist and surrounded herself with leading Buddhist monks of the time. She also used her influence and financial resources to extensively support Buddhist monasteries, particularly in the 1570s and 1580s, and to a lesser extent after 1601.

== Biography ==
Lady Li was born in 1545 during China's Ming dynasty in Huo County, present-day a district of Beijing. Her father, Li Wei (李偉), was a bricklayer and a descendant of soldiers who had been resettled from Shanxi to Beijing in the early 15th century. She received a good education and in 1550, she became one of the maids of Zhu Zaiji, Prince of Yu. In 1563, she gave birth to his third son, Zhu Yijun. Zhu Zaiji ascended the throne as the Longqing Emperor in 1567, and he named Zhu Yijun as his heir the following year.

Following his accession, the Longqing Emperor elevated Lady Li to the position of Noble Consort (Guifei). Despite being favored by the Emperor, she maintained a positive relationship with his empress, Lady Chen, who had no sons and was her main competition for his attention. Her ability to work with her rivals and competitors was evident throughout her life and played a significant role in her achievements. Zhang Dewei described her as capable, wise, and decisive, while also noting that she was sensitive, knew her limits, and never overstepped her boundaries.

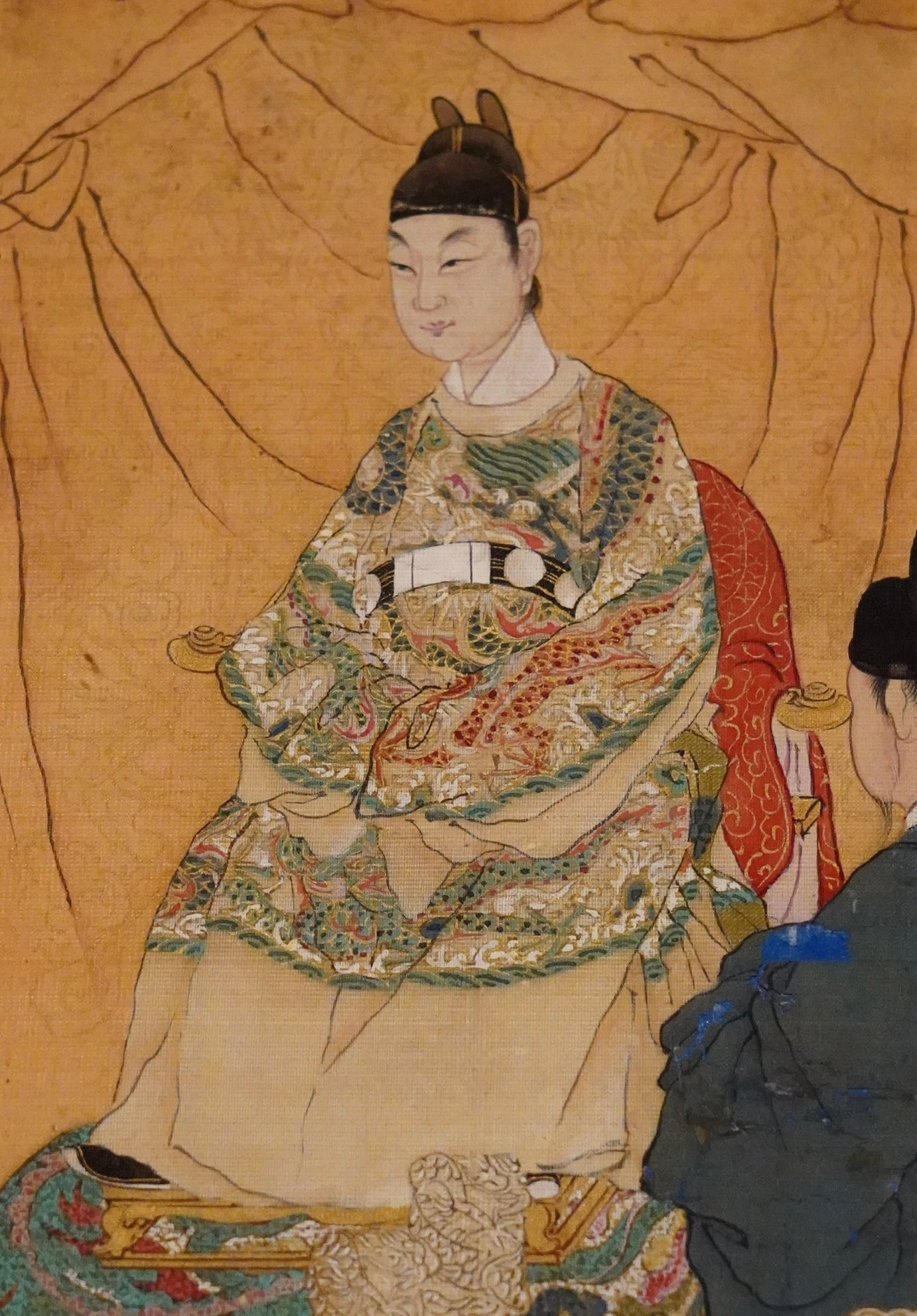
The young Wanli Emperor, c. 1577

In 1572, the Longqing Emperor died and his son with Lady Li became the Wanli Emperor. She was granted the title of empress dowager and, as per the law, assumed the role of head of government during her son's minority. She formed an alliance with Senior Grand Secretary Zhang Juzheng and the highest-ranking eunuch in the imperial palace, Feng Bao. Together, they ruled the empire, with Zhang overseeing the government, Feng Bao managing the imperial eunuchs, and Empress Dowager Li supervising the Wanli Emperor's education, but she did not interfere in political decision-making. At the government's request, she spent more time in the imperial palace than in her own empress dowager palace until 1578 to oversee her son's education. Hoping the young emperor would become diligent, responsible, and humble, Empress Dowager Li raised him with both care and strict discipline. (Note: For example, in 1580, the Wanli Emperor was drinking with his eunuchs. One of them refused to sing at the Emperor's request, which angered the Emperor. He threatened to behead the eunuch but ultimately only cut off his hair. The following day, Empress Dowager Li reprimanded her son for his behavior and made him kneel and apologize. She also summoned Zhang Juzheng and members of the Grand Secretariat and announced her demand for the Wanli Emperor to be replaced on the throne by his younger brother as punishment. This demand shocked the Emperor and the officials. Eventually, the situation was resolved when the Wanli Emperor signed an edict of apology, expressing remorse for his actions, and transferred his favorite eunuchs out of Beijing. This incident damaged the Emperor's relationships with his mother and ministers.) The Wanli Emperor's deep respect and devotion towards his mother, instilled by his strict upbringing, prevented him from openly opposing her throughout his life.

The alliance between Empress Dowager Li, Zhang Juzheng, and Feng Bao successfully governed the country for a decade until Zhang's death in 1582. The Empress Dowager's position as the head of the government brought her prestige and recognition, but in accordance with the rules established by the founding Ming emperor Hongwu, she refrained from actively participating in politics and only occasionally attempted to intervene. For example, due to her Buddhist beliefs, she requested Zhang Juzheng to temporarily abolish the death penalty, but when he refused, citing the need to follow existing laws, she did not push her requests further. When she learned of the investigation into her father and brother for corruption, she did not offer them support but instead sent her father a set of masonry tools as a reminder of his humble origins. Even after Zhang Juzheng's death and Feng Bao's dismissal, Empress Dowager Li maintained her influence by forming an alliance with Zhang's successors, the grand secretaries Shen Shixing, Xu Guo (許國), and Wang Xijue.

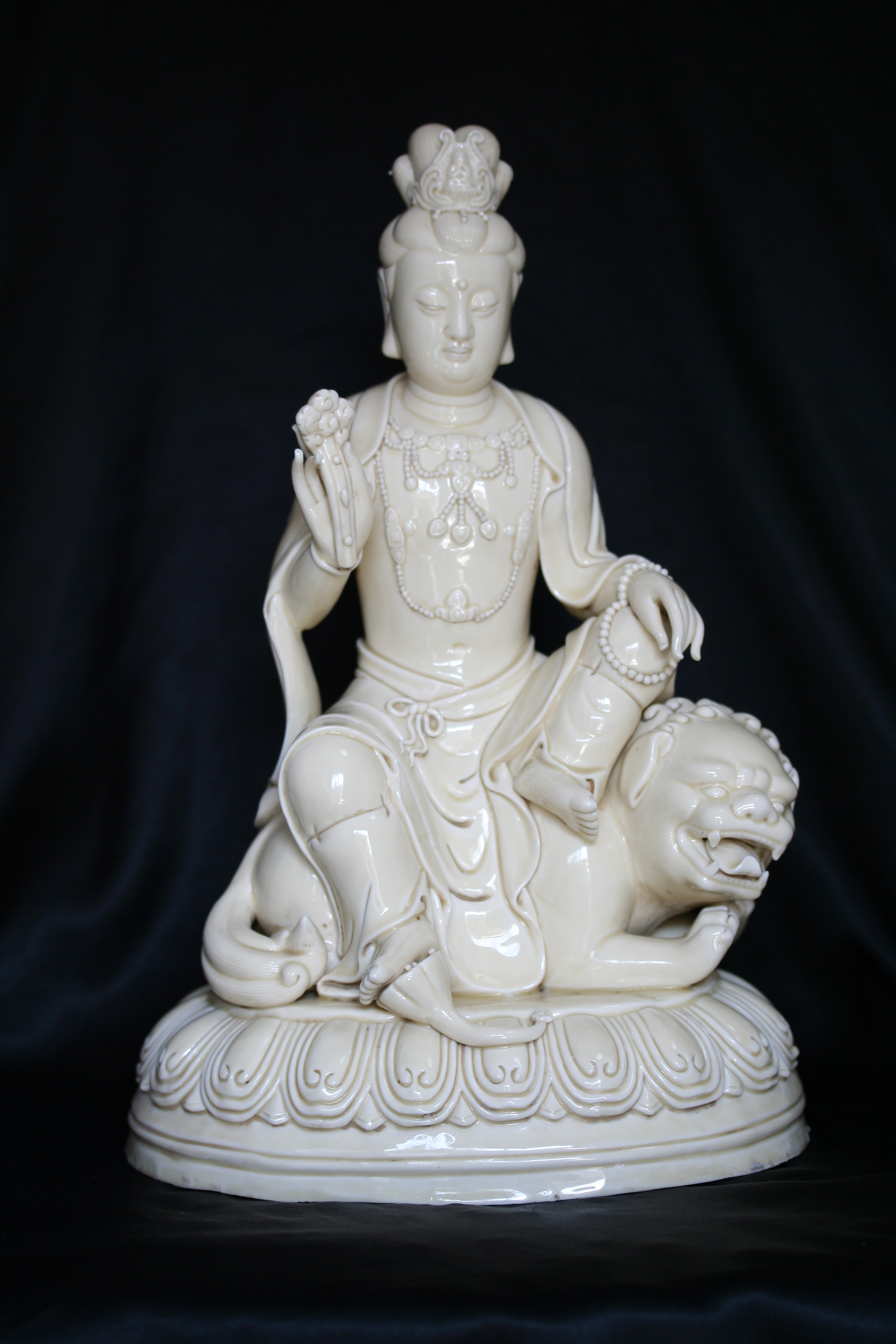
Bodhisattva Manjushri in Blanc-de-Chine, early 17th century

Empress Dowager Li devoted herself to religious practice instead of involving herself in politics. She was a devout Buddhist, known for her support of the reconstruction and construction of numerous Buddhist monasteries. She also made generous donations to Buddhist monks and monasteries. She even referred to herself as the bodhisattva Guanyin (Avalokiteśvara) and was often associated with this deity. She funded many expensive construction projects during the 1570s, 1580s, and the first half of the 1590s. Initially, her support was focused on Buddhists in and around Beijing, but she eventually expanded her efforts to include other regions, such as Jiangnan. In the mid-1590s, a disagreement with the Emperor over the appointment of an heir to the throne caused a rift, resulting in her having fewer resources to fund projects. It was not until after the appointment of a successor in 1601 and the resolution of the dispute with the Emperor that she was able to resume her activities, although they were not as extensive as they were during the first half of the Wanli Emperor's reign.

In 1586, a succession dispute arose when the Emperor elevated his favorite concubine, Lady Zheng, to the rank of "Imperial Noble Consort" (Huang Guifei) after she gave birth to a son, Zhu Changxun (1586–1641). She was now just one rank below Empress Wang and above any of his other concubines, including Lady Wang, the mother of the Emperor's eldest son Zhu Changluo (1582–1620). It was evident to those around the Emperor that he favored Lady Zheng's son as his successor over his eldest son. This caused officials to demand the appointment of an heir, with many citing laws that required the appointment of the eldest son, but some sided with the Emperor and Lady Zheng. Despite the disputes, the Emperor delayed the decision until 1601, when he finally appointed Zhu Changluo as his successor. In the midst of the dispute, Empress Dowager Li and Empress Wang supported Lady Wang and her son. When the Emperor complained that his eldest son was the son of a mere palace maid, the Empress Dowager countered that the Emperor himself was also the son of a mere maid. Her public and behind-the-scenes support for the Empress and Lady Wang balanced the Emperor's favoritism towards Lady Zheng. Empress Dowager Li relied on the laws established by the Hongwu Emperor, which considered the appointment of the empress and the heir to the throne as family matters of the imperial family. This gave her, as empress dowager, the final and decisive word. As time passed, a loose group formed around her, consisting of high officials, prominent Buddhist monks, ordinary officials, and some eunuchs, all supporting her interests and those of the Emperor's eldest son.

In 1595–1604, a disagreement over the succession caused a rift between the Emperor and his mother. The Emperor had agreed to begin the education of his eldest son in early 1594, but this concession was followed by attacks on the Empress Dowager. In 1595, her close confidant, the Buddhist monk Hanshan Deqing, was arrested and sent to southern China. That same year, the Emperor did not attend her birthday celebration. The following year, he demoted and transferred his mother's eunuch relative, the high-ranking and respected Zhang Cheng (張誠), to Nanjing. In 1600, the Emperor bestowed a high honorary title on the Taoist Geng Yilan, who had participated in the arrest of Hanshan Deqing.

After the appointment of the heir to the throne in 1601, the Emperor's relationship with his mother began to improve. In 1602, he bestowed gifts upon her brother, the Count of Wuqing, and in 1604, he had two temples built for her health. Their relationship continued to be steadily good as the persecution of Buddhists over the previous decade ceased. The Emperor and Empress Dowager even supported Buddhist monks and monasteries on various occasions. Empress Dowager Li returned to public life on a larger scale after 1604, renewing her support for Buddhist institutions that had been subdued in the decade after 1594. She died in 1614 and was buried with the Longqing Emperor in the Zhao Mausoleum in the Ming tombs near Beijing.

== Titles ==
- During the reign of the Jiajing Emperor (1521–1567):
  - Lady Li (李氏; from 1545)
  - Maid in the Prince's Household (王府宫人; from 1550)
  - Concubine of the Prince of Yu (year of appointment unknown)
- During the reign of the Longqing Emperor (1567–1572):
  - Imperial Noble Consort (皇貴妃; from 1567)
- During the reign of the Wanli Emperor (1572–1620):
  - Empress Dowager Cisheng (慈聖皇太后; from 1572)
  - Empress Dowager Cisheng Xuanwen Mingsu (慈聖宣文皇太后; from 1578)
  - Empress Dowager Cisheng Xuanwen Mingsu (慈聖宣文明肅皇太后; from 1582)
  - Empress Dowager Cisheng Xuanwen Mingsu Zhenshou Duanxian (慈聖宣文明肅貞壽端獻皇太后; from 1601)
  - Empress Dowager Cisheng Xuanwen Mingsu Zhenshou Duanxian Gongxi (慈聖宣文明肅貞壽端獻恭熹皇太后; from 1606)
  - Empress Dowager Xiaoding Zhenchun Qinren Duansu Bitian Zuosheng (孝定貞純欽仁端肅弼天祚聖皇太后, from 1614)

== Issue ==
- As Concubine Li:
  - Zhu Yijun, the Wanli Emperor (萬曆帝 朱翊鈞; 1563–1620, r. 1572–1620), the Longqing Emperor's third son
  - Princess Shouyang (壽陽公主), personal name Yao'e (堯娥), the Longqing Emperor's third daughter. Married in 1581 to Hou Gongchen (侯拱辰).
- As Imperial Noble Consort Li:
  - Princess Yongning (永寧公主; d. 1594), personal name Yaoying (堯媖), the Longqing Emperor's fourth daughter. Married in 1582 to Liang Bangrui (梁邦瑞).
  - Zhu Yiliu, Prince Jian of Lu (潞簡王 朱翊鏐; 1568–1614), the Longqing Emperor's fourth son
  - Princess Rui'an (瑞安公主), personal name Yaoyuan (堯媛), the Longqing Emperor's fifth daughter. Married in 1585 to Wan Wei (萬煒; d. 1644).
