= Empress Xiaoke (Jiajing) =

Chinese posthumous empress (1510–1554)

Empress Xiaoke 孝恪皇后
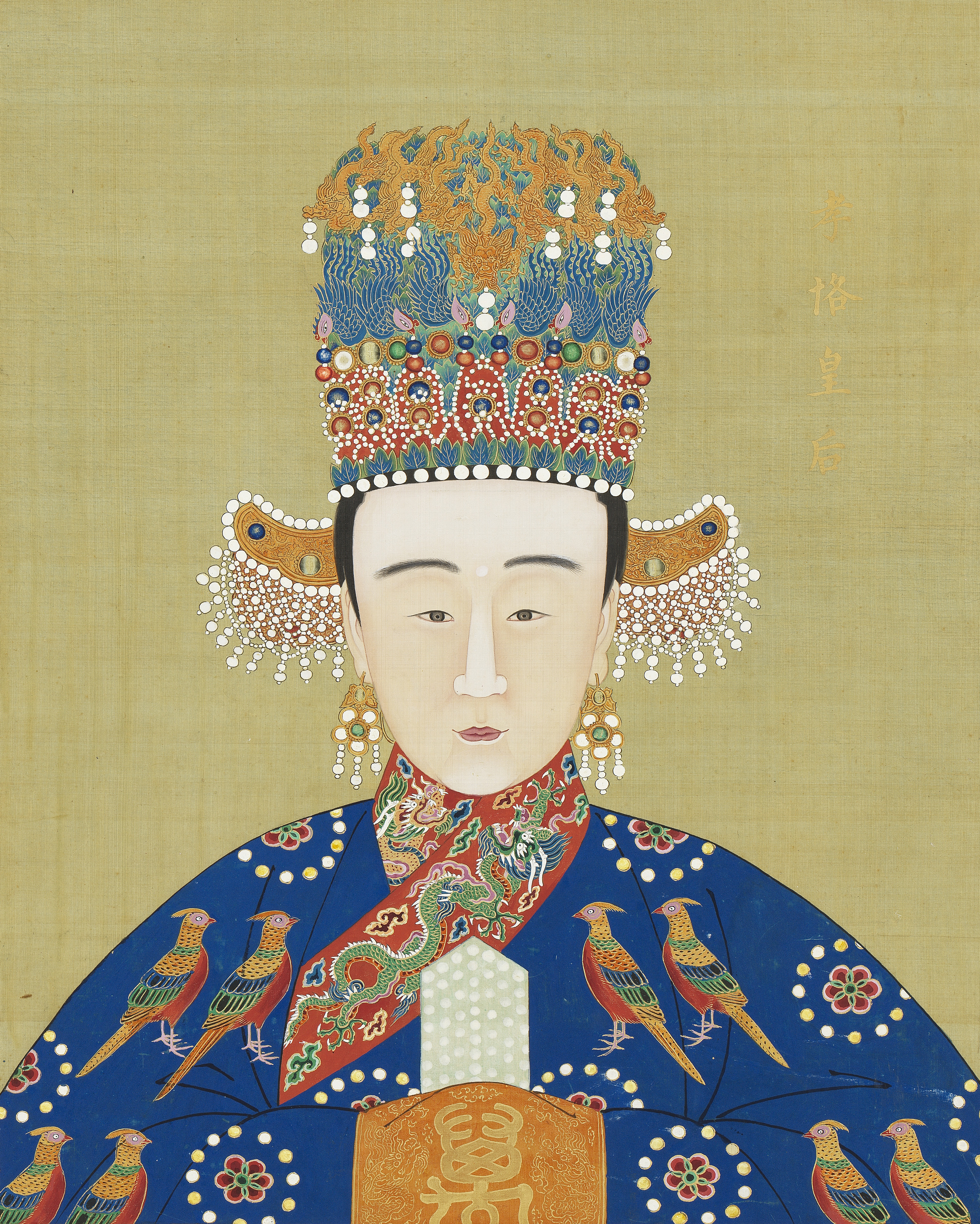
- Born: 1510; Daxing, Zhili (present-day Daxing District, Beijing, China)
- Died: 1554 (aged 43–44); Beijing
- Burial: Yongling Mausoleum
- Spouse: Jiajing Emperor (m. 1530)
- Issue: Longqing Emperor
Posthumous name
- Empress Xiaoke Chun Ciyi Gongshun Zantian Kaisheng (孝恪淵純慈懿恭順贊天開聖皇后)
- Clan: Du (杜)
- Father: Du Lin (杜林)

Empress Xiaoke (孝恪皇后; 1510–1554) of the Du clan, was a concubine of Jiajing Emperor of the Ming dynasty and the mother of Zhu Zaiji, the Longqing Emperor.

== Biography ==
In the 9th year (1530) of the Jiajing Emperor's reign, Lady Du was selected to become a concubine of Jiajing Emperor. In the fifteenth year of Jiajing reign, she was promoted to concubine Kang, and in the sixteenth year (1537), and she gave birth to Zhu Zaiji, the third son of the emperor who was not favoured.

In the first month of the 33rd year of Jiajing (1554), Lady Du died at age 40. She was posthumously named Consort Rongshukang (荣淑康妃). She was buried in Yuquan Mountain. The ceremonial officer asked Zhu Zaiji to serve the three-year mourning but the Jiajing Emperor did not allow it.

After Zhu Zaiji became emperor, he posthumously awarded his mother with the title "Empress Xiaoke" and was reburied Yongling tombs.

== Titles ==
- During the reign of the Zhengde Emperor (r. 1505–1521)
  - Lady Du (杜氏; from 1510)
- During the reign of the Jiajing Emperor (r. 1521–1567)
  - Concubine Kang (康嫔; from March 1531)
  - Consort Kang (康妃; from 1536)
  - Consort Rongshukang (荣淑康妃; from 1554)
- During the reign of the Longqing Emperor (r. 1567–1572)
  - Empress Xiaoke Chun Ciyi Gongshun Zantian Kaisheng (孝恪淵純慈懿恭順贊天開聖皇后; from 1567)

== Issue ==
- As Consort Kang:
  - Zhu Zaiji, the Longqing Emperor (隆慶帝 朱載坖; 4 March 1537 – 5 July 1572), the Jiajing Emperor's third son
