= Jen (disambiguation) =

Jen is a feminine given name and a surname.

Jen or JEN may also refer to:

- JEN (charity), a Japanese humanitarian aid organisation
- Jen language, an Adamawa language of Nigeria
- Joves d'Esquerra Nacionalista, the youth wing of the Socialist Party of Majorca
- Ren (Confucianism) (Jen in Wade–Giles), a Confucian virtue
