= Empress Chen (Longqing) =

Empress of China from 1567 to 1572

Empress Xiao'an 孝安皇后
- Empress consort of the Ming dynasty
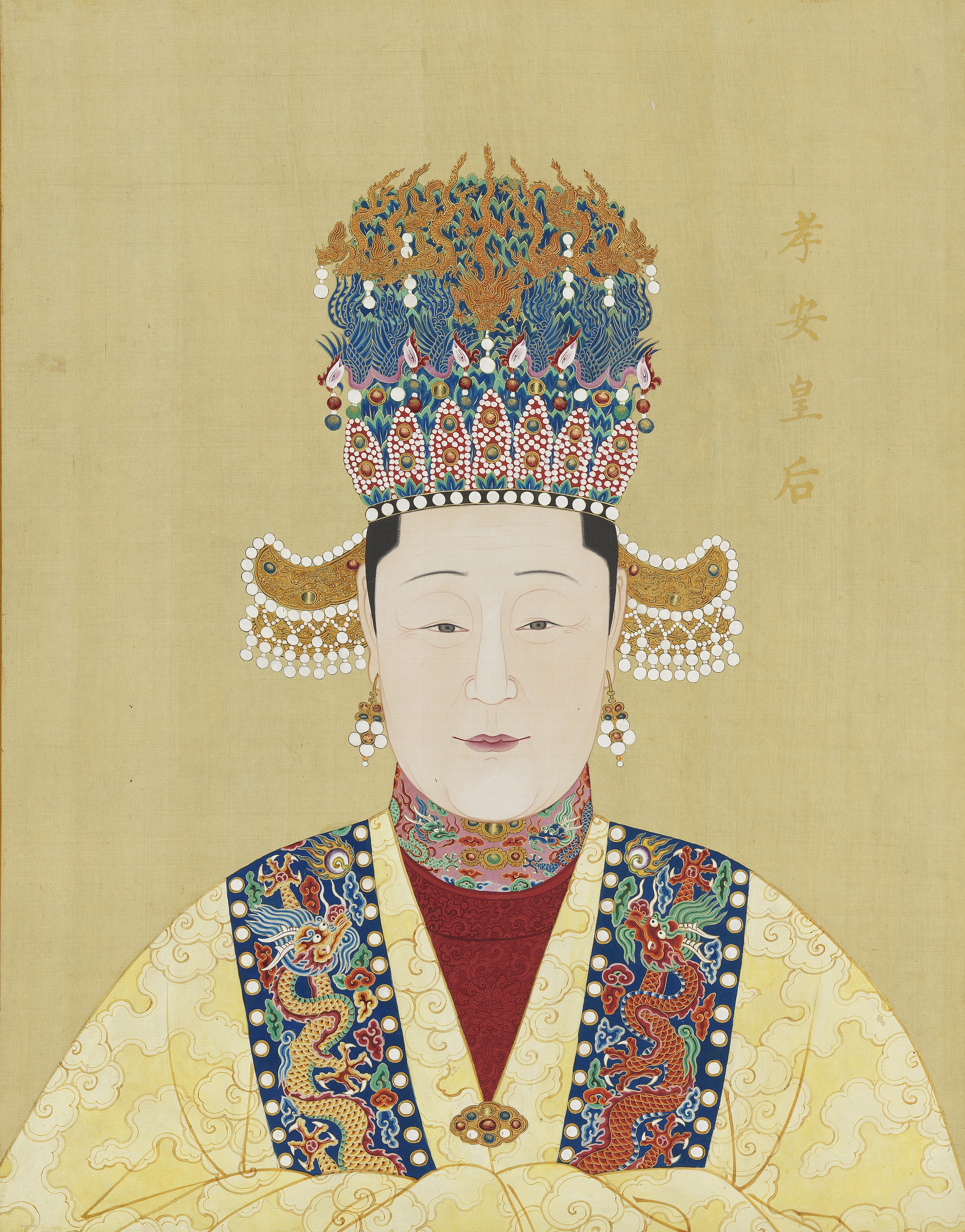
- Born: Tongzhou, Zhili (present-day Tongzhou District, Beijing, China)
- Died: 1596
- Burial: Zhaoling Mausoleum
- Spouse: Longqing Emperor (m. 1558; died 1572)
- Clan: Chen
- Father: Chen Jingxing

Chinese name
- Chinese: 孝安皇后
Transcriptions
Standard Mandarin
- Hanyu Pinyin: Xiào'ān Huánghòu

Empress Xiao'an (d. 1596), of the Chen clan, was a Chinese empress consort of the Ming dynasty. She was the second wife of the Longqing Emperor.

In 1558, following the death of his first wife Lady Li, Zhu Zaiji, Prince of Yu, married Lady Chen. Upon his ascension to the throne as the Longqing Emperor in 1567, he appointed her as his empress. After only two years, however, she fell out of favor with the Emperor and was moved to a separate palace in 1569. She became ill and was not properly cared for. The Emperor told opposing officials that she did not understand his family affairs and that she had no son and was in poor health. Another alleged reason for her removal was her criticism of the Emperor's preoccupation with women and music.

The Emperor's son from a concubine, the heir to the throne and future Wanli Emperor, however, treated the Empress well and visited her regularly. After his ascension to the throne, he granted her the title of empress dowager and always treated her with respect as his father's principal wife.

== Titles ==
The titles of Empress Chen:

- During the reign of the Jiajing Emperor (r. 1521–1567):
  - Lady Chen (陳氏)
  - Princess Consort of Yu (裕王妃; from 1558)
- During the reign of the Longqing Emperor (r. 1567–1572):
  - Empress (皇后; from 1567)
- During the reign of the Wanli Emperor (r. 1572–1620):
  - Empress Dowager Rensheng (仁聖皇太后; from 1572)
  - Empress Dowager Rensheng Zhenyi (仁聖貞懿皇太后; from 1578)
  - Empress Dowager Rensheng Zhenyi Kangjing (仁聖貞懿康靜皇太后; from 1582)
  - Empress Xiao'an Zhenyi Gongchun Wenhui Zuotian Hongsheng (孝安貞懿恭純溫惠佐天弘聖皇后; from 1596)

Chinese royalty
Vacant Title last held by Empress Dowager Zhaosheng and Empress Dowager Zhangsheng	Empress dowager of the Ming dynasty 1572–1596 with Empress Dowager Xiaoding	Vacant Title next held by Empress Dowager Ningsheng (Southern Ming)
Vacant Title last held by Empress Xiaolie	Empress consort of the Ming dynasty 1567–1572	Vacant Title next held by Empress Xiaoduanxian
Preceded by Princess Consort Li	Princess consort of Yu; 1558–1567	The Prince of Yu ascended the throne
