= Zhen =

Zhen may refer to:

- Towns of China, called zhèn (镇) in Chinese
- Zhen (surname) (甄), a Chinese surname
- Balhae Kingdom, originally called Zhen (振) in Chinese
- Lady Zhen (183-221), wife of Cao Pi of Cao Wei of the Three Kingdoms
- Empress Zhen (Cao Fang) (died 251), empress of Cao Wei, wife of Cao Feng
- Empress Dowager Ci'an (1837-1881), Noble Consort Zhen to the Xianfeng Emperor of the Qing Dynasty
- Empress Zhen (Liao dynasty) (died 951), wife of Emperor Shizong of Liao
- Zhēn(砧 or 碪) is dadeumi which is laundry tool.
- Zhěn (轸) or Chariot, a Chinese constellation

== See also ==
- Chen (disambiguation)
- Zhen Zhen (珍珍), female giant panda
- Zhenniao, a legendary creature
