= Empress Xiaojing (Wanli) =

Chinese empress dowager (1565–1611)

Empress Xiaojing 孝靖皇后
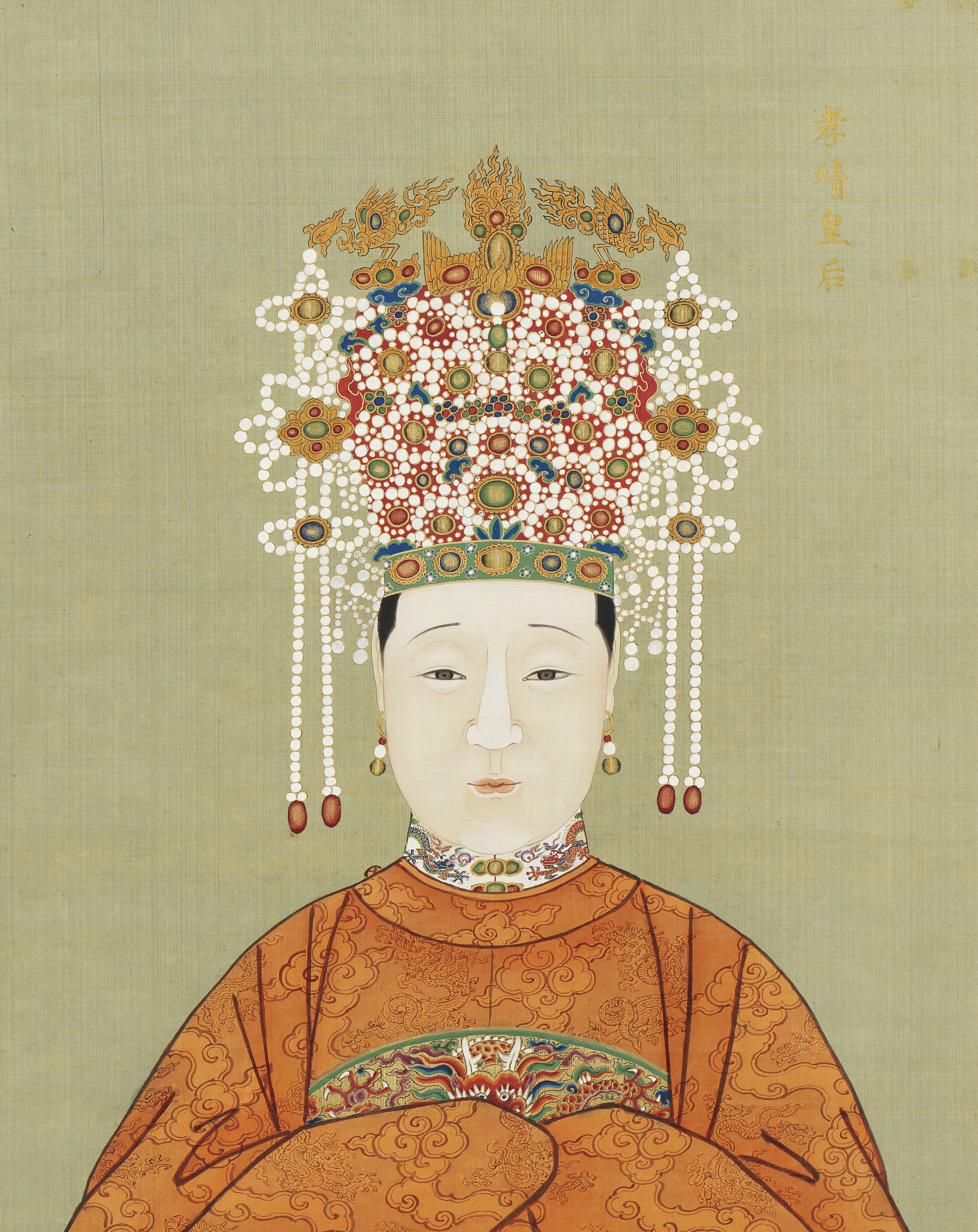
- Born: 27 February 1565; Hebei
- Died: 18 October 1611 (aged 46); Jingyang Palace, Forbidden City, Beijing
- Burial: Ding Mausoleum
- Spouse: Wanli Emperor (m. 1582)
- Issue: Taichang Emperor; Princess Yunmeng
Posthumous name
- Empress Dowager Xiaojing Wenyi Jingrang Zhenci Cantian Yinsheng (孝靖溫懿敬讓貞慈參天胤聖皇太后)
- Clan: Wang
- Father: Wang Chaocai
- Mother: Lady Ge

Chinese name
- Chinese: 孝靖皇后
Transcriptions
Standard Mandarin
- Hanyu Pinyin: Xiàojìng Huánghòu

Empress Xiaojing (27 February 1565 – 18 October 1611), of the Wang clan, was a concubine of the Wanli Emperor of China's Ming dynasty and the biological mother of the Taichang Emperor. Lady Wang entered the imperial palace as a maid serving Empress Dowager Li, the Wanli Emperor's mother. She later became one of the Wanli Emperor's concubines and gave birth to his first son, Zhu Changluo. Due to the Emperor's favor toward Noble Consort Zheng and the prolonged succession dispute surrounding the choice of heir apparent, Lady Wang spent much of her life in relative obscurity. The Emperor eventually appointed Zhu Changluo as his heir, but Lady Wang died in 1611 before her son ascended as the Taichang Emperor. Her grandson, the Tianqi Emperor, posthumously honored her as empress in 1620.

== Biography ==
Lady Wang was born on 27 February 1565 during the Ming dynasty in present-day Hebei Province, China, to Wang Chaocai (王朝寀), a company commander (baihu) of the Imperial Guard, and Lady Ge (葛). She began serving as a maid (宮人) in the palace of Empress Dowager Li in 1578. In late 1581, when Lady Li's son the Wanli Emperor visited his mother, he became attracted to Lady Wang, and she soon became pregnant by him. Although the Emperor initially wanted nothing to do with the child, Lady Li convinced him to acknowledge paternity through records of his visits and arranged for Lady Wang to be promoted as a concubine with the title of Consort Gong (恭妃). Lady Wang then moved to Jingyang Palace, where she lived for the rest of her life. In August 1582, she gave birth to the Emperor's first son, Zhu Changluo. The Emperor's interest in Lady Wang diminished after 1584, as he became more enamored with another concubine, Lady Zheng, who also gave birth to a son, Zhu Changxun, in 1586.

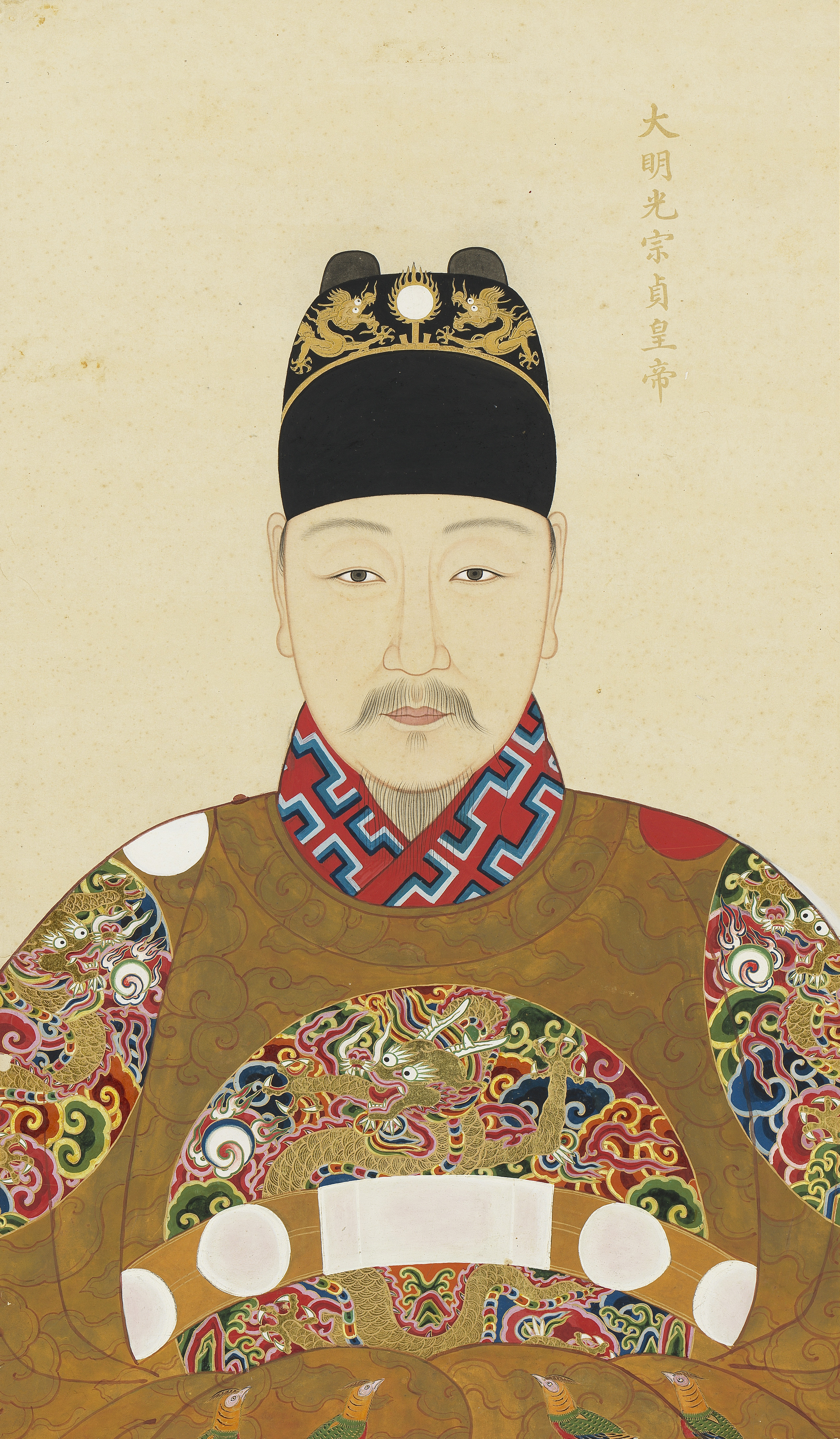
Zhu Changluo, Empress Xiaojing's son, was unable to see his mother for nearly thirty years until her critical illness in 1611.

Lady Wang lived in seclusion and isolation within the Forbidden City, and the Emperor neglected her and rarely allowed their son to visit her. Although Zhu Changluo was his eldest son, the Emperor did not immediately name him as heir to the throne, despite Lady Li and government officials advocating for his appointment. Instead, the Emperor and Lady Zheng favored Zhu Changxun. It was not until 1601, after prolonged disputes and discussions, that Zhu Changluo finally became the designated heir. Five years later, in 1606, after the birth of Zhu Changluo's first son (the future Tianqi Emperor), Lady Wang was finally granted the title of Imperial Noble Consort (Huang Guifei), a fitting recognition for the mother of an heir.

In 1611, Lady Wang became critically ill, and Zhu Changluo requested permission to visit her. By then, she had become blind. She died on 18 October 1611, not long after their meeting, and was buried on Tianshou Mountain. Her son ascended the throne as the Taichang Emperor in 1620 but died after only one month of reign. Her grandson, the Tianqi Emperor, upon assuming the throne, bestowed upon her the posthumous name Empress Dowager Xiaojing and reburied her in the Wanli Emperor's tomb, Ding Mausoleum, in the Ming tombs outside Beijing.

== Titles ==
The titles of Empress Xiaojing:

- During the reign of the Jiajing Emperor (1521–1567):
  - Lady Wang (王氏; 27 February 1565)
- During the reign of the Wanli Emperor (1572–1620):
  - Palace Lady (宮人; from 1578)
  - Consort Gong (恭妃; from 5 July 1582)
  - Imperial Noble Consort (皇貴妃; from 1605)
  - Imperial Noble Consort Wensu Duanjing Chunyi (温肃端靖纯懿皇贵妃; from 1611)
- During the reign of the Tianqi Emperor (1620–1627)
  - Empress Dowager Xiaojing Wenyi Jingrang Zhenci Cantian Yinsheng (孝靖溫懿敬讓貞慈參天胤聖皇太后; from 1621)

== Issue ==
- As Consort Gong:
  - Zhu Changluo (朱常洛), the Taichang Emperor (泰昌帝; 1582–1620), the Wanli Emperor's first son
  - Princess Yunmeng (雲夢公主), personal name Xuanyuan (軒嫄), the Wanli Emperor's fourth daughter
