= Empress Xiaoyizhuang =

Chinese imperial consort (1530–1558)

Empress Xiaoyizhuang 孝懿莊皇后
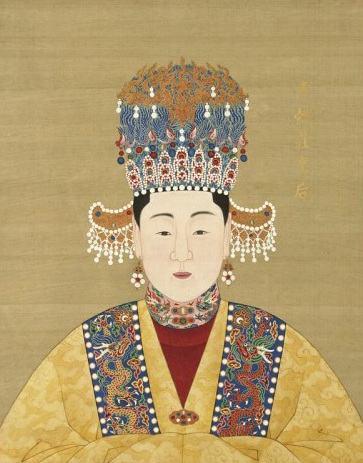

Princess consort of Yu
- Tenure: 1553–1558
- Successor: Empress Xiao'an
- Born: 1530; Changping, Zhili (present-day Changping District, Beijing, China)
- Died: 1558 (aged 27–28); Beijing
- Burial: Zhao Mausoleum
- Spouse: Longqing Emperor (m. 1553)
- Issue: Zhu Yiyi, Crown Prince Xianhuai; Zhu Yiling, Prince Dao of Jing; Princess Penglai
Posthumous name
- Empress Xiaoyi Zhenhui Shunzhe Gongren Litian Xiangsheng Zhuang (孝懿貞惠順哲恭仁儷天襄聖莊皇后)
- Clan: Li (李)
- Father: Li Ming (李铭)

Empress Xiaoyizhuang (孝懿莊皇后 李氏; 1530–1558), of the Li clan, was a Chinese imperial consort of the Ming dynasty, she was the first wife of the Longqing Emperor. Her father is Li Ming (李铭).

== Life ==
In the 2nd month of the 32nd year of Jiajing (1553), Lady Li married Zhu Zaiji and was bestowed the title of Princess consort of Yu (裕王妃). On 15 October 1555 she gave birth to the eldest son of Zhu Zaiji, Zhu Yiyi, who would die prematurely in 11 May 1559. After his father ascended the throne, he was named the Crown Prince Xianhuai in the first year of Longqing (1567).

It is unknown when Lady Li gave birth to his second son, Zhu Yiling, who died aged one. Zhu Yiling was posthumously named Prince Dao of Jing. Lady Li gave birth to a daughter in an unknown year who is known as Princess Penglai. In the 4th month of the thirty-seventh year of Jiajing (1558), Lady Li who was only in her 20s died. After Zhu Zaiji came to the throne, he personally appointed the posthumous title to Empress Xiaoyizhuang.

== Titles ==
- During the reign of the Jiajing Emperor (r. 1521–1567):
  - Lady Li (李氏; from 1530)
  - Princess consort of Yu (裕王妃; from 1553)
- During the reign of the Longqing Emperor (r. 1567–1572):
  - Empress Xiaoyi (孝懿皇后; from 1567)
- During the reign of the Wanli Emperor (r. 1572–1620):
  - Empress Xiaoyi Zhenhui Shunzhe Gongren Litian Xiangsheng Zhuang (孝懿貞惠順哲恭仁儷天襄聖莊皇后; from 1572)

== Issue ==
- As Princess of Yu:
  - Zhu Yiyi, Crown Prince Xianhuai (憲懷皇太子 朱翊釴; 15 October 1555 – 11 May 1559), the Longqing Emperor's first son
  - Zhu Yiling, Prince Dao of Jing (靖悼王 朱翊鈴), the Longqing Emperor's second son
  - Princess Penglai (蓬萊公主; 1557), the Longqong Emperor's first daughter
