= Chen (Thessaly) =

Town and polis in ancient Thessaly

Coordinates: 38°48′N 22°12′E

Chen (Ancient Greek: Χήν), or Chenai (Χῆναι), was a town and polis (city-state) of Oetaea in ancient Thessaly. It is mentioned by Pausanias.

Its location is on Mount Oeta.
