= Ding Mausoleum =

Ming dynasty mausoleum in Beijing, China

Ming Dingling
- 明定陵
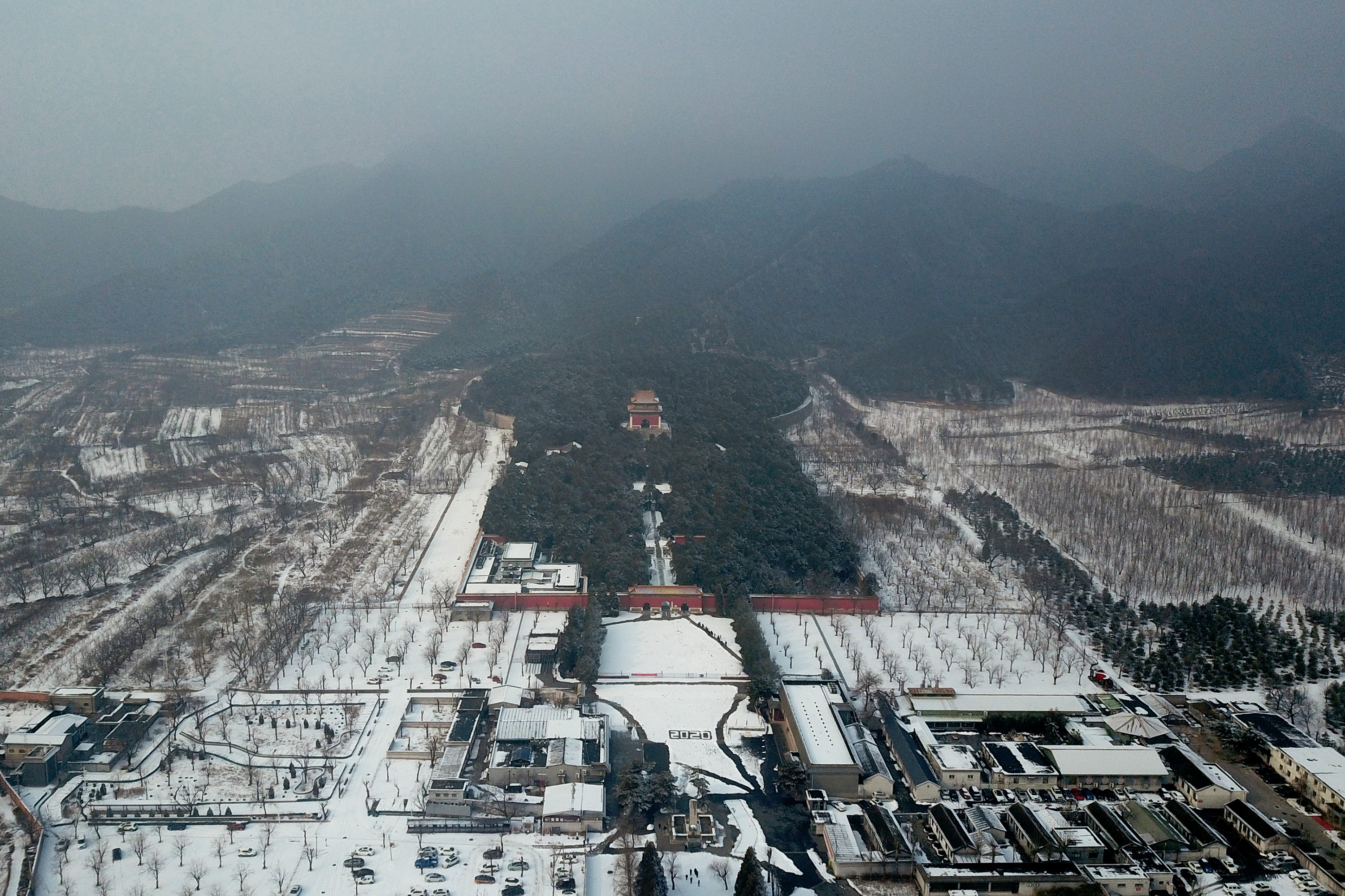
- Interactive map of the Ming Dingling area

General information
- Location: Changping District, Beijing, China
- Coordinates: 40°17′40″N 116°13′0″E

The Ming Dingling (Chinese: 明定陵; pinyin: Míng Dìng Líng) is a mausoleum in China where the Wanli Emperor, together with his two empresses Wang Xijie and Dowager Xiaojing, were buried. Dingling is one of the thirteen imperial tombs at Ming tombs in Changping district 45 km north of central Beijing. The Dingling is the only tomb of a Ming dynasty emperor that has been excavated since the founding of the People's Republic of China, a situation that is almost a direct result of the fate that befell Dingling and its contents after the excavation.

== History ==
The Wanli Emperor was the thirteenth emperor of the Ming dynasty and ruled from 1572 to 1620. His mausoleum, the Dingling, was built between 1584 and 1590 and occupies a surface area of 180,000 square meters (1,937,503.9 sq ft). The mausoleum consists of five halls with some walls, and is located 27 meters (89 ft) below ground. The name Dingling was used for Chinese imperial tombs both before and after the Ming dynasty.

== Excavation of the Dingling Mausoleum ==
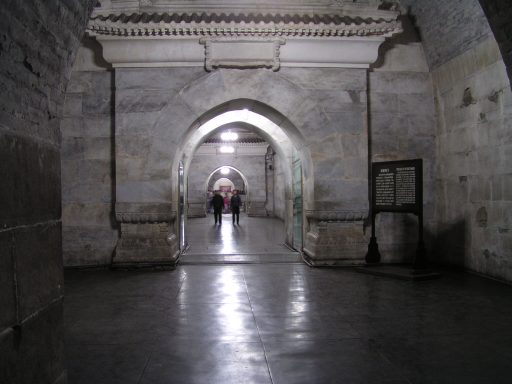
Inside the Dingling Mausoleum

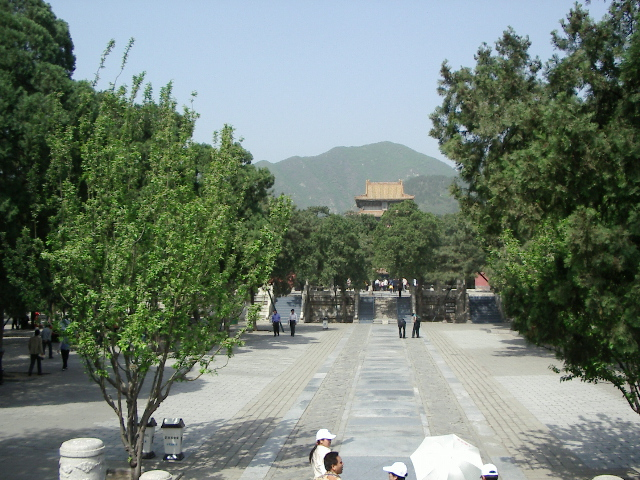
Dingling Mausoleum, one of the Thirteen Tombs of the Ming dynasty near Beijing

A group of prominent scholars led by Guo Moruo and historian and Beijing deputy mayor Wu Han began advocating the excavation of Changling, the tomb of the Yongle Emperor, the largest and oldest of the Ming tombs near Beijing. Despite winning approval from premier Zhou Enlai, this plan was vetoed by archaeologists because of the importance and public profile of Changling. Instead, Dingling, the third largest of the Ming Tombs, was selected by Wu Han as a trial site in preparation for the excavation of Changling.

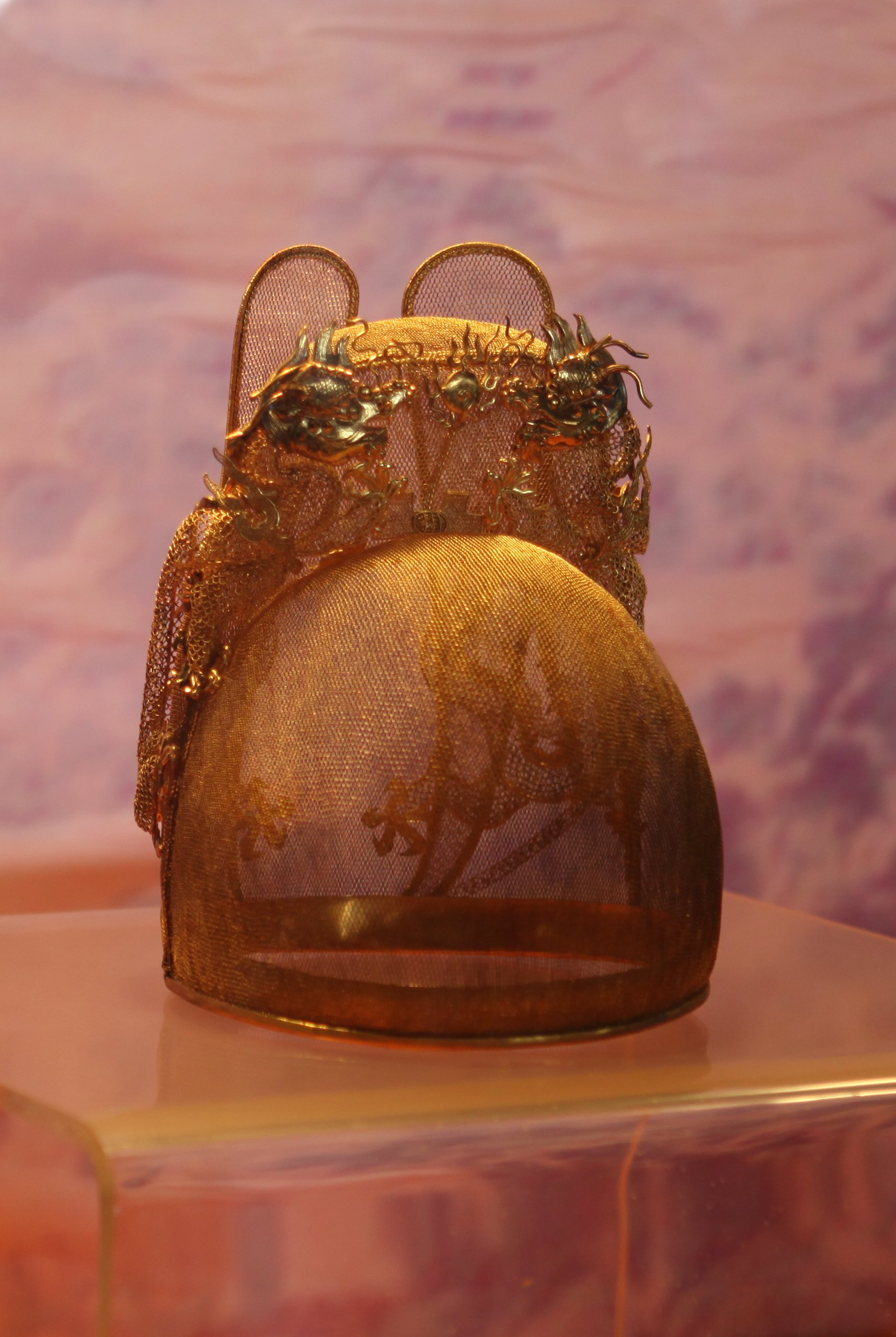
Golden crown (replica) excavated from Dingling Mausoleum

The excavation of Dingling began in 1956, which revealed an intact 1,195-square-meter (12,862.9 sq ft) tomb, more than 3,000 artifacts; thousands of items of silk, textiles, wood, and porcelain, and the skeletons of the Wanli Emperor and his two empresses. However, there was neither the technology nor the resources to adequately preserve the excavated artifacts. After several disastrous experiments, the large amount of silk and other textiles were simply piled into a drafty storage room that was wet from water leaks. As a result, most of the surviving artifacts have severely deteriorated, and many replicas would instead later be displayed in the museum. Furthermore, the political impetus behind the excavation created pressure to quickly complete the excavation; the resulting haste rendered documentation of the excavation was poor. Excavation completed in 1957 and a museum was established in 1959.

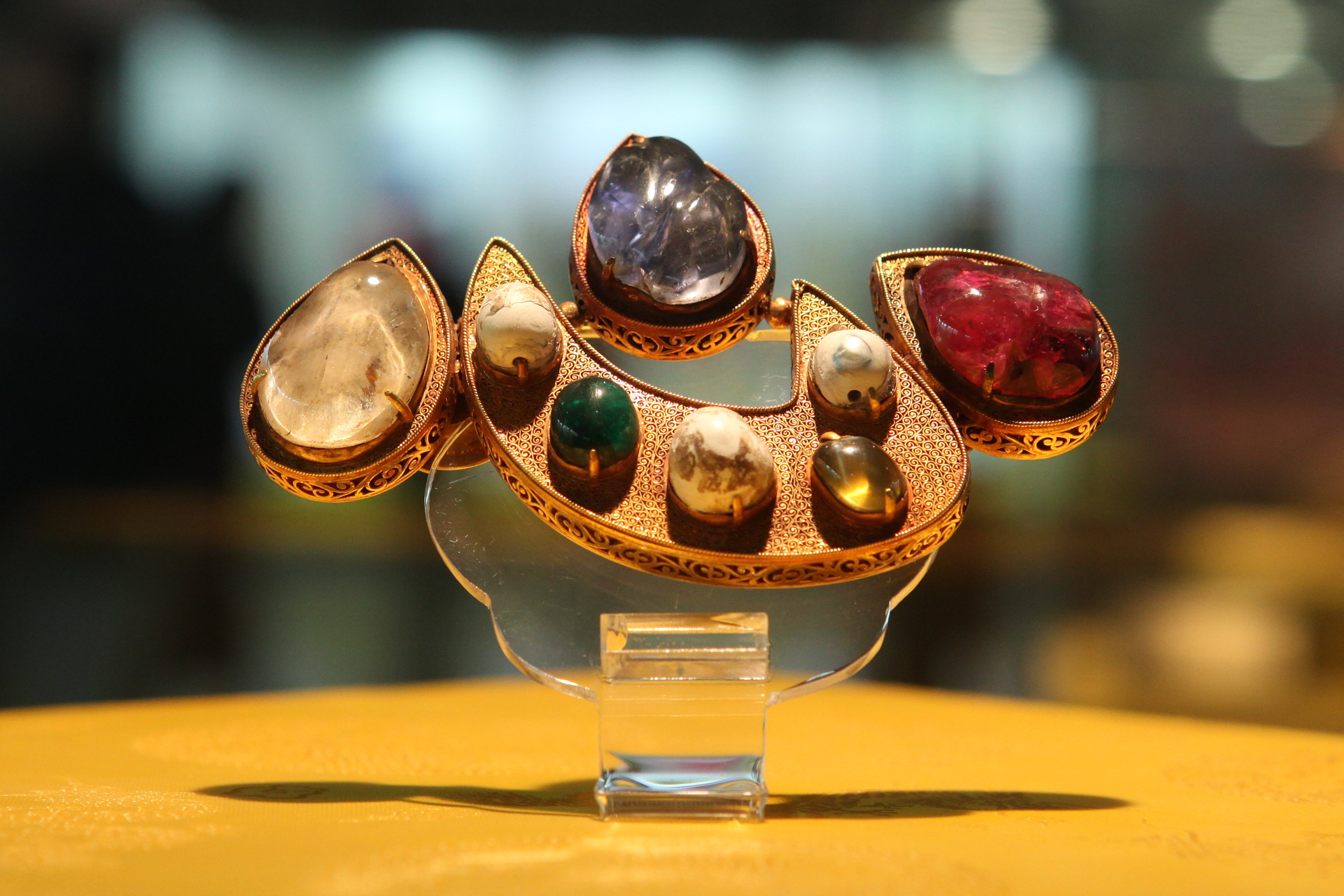
Jewelry from Ming tombs, shaped like the Chinese character '心', a Kangxi radical meaning 'heart'.

A far more severe problem soon befell the project when a series of political mass movements that soon escalated into the Cultural Revolution of 1966 swept the country with all archeological work was stopped for the next ten years.

During the first phase of the Cultural Revolution, fervent Red Guards stormed the Dingling museum and tomb and dragged the remains of the Wanli Emperor and empresses to the front of the tomb, where they were posthumously "denounced", burned and thrown away. Even their coffins were destroyed. Many other artifacts were also destroyed. Wu Han, one of the key advocates of the project, became the first major target of the Cultural Revolution, was denounced, and died in jail in 1969.

It was not until 1976, after the death of Mao Zedong, that archaeological work recommenced in earnest and an excavation report was finally prepared by archaeologists who had survived the turmoil.

The excavation of Dingling has been questioned because it was never formally approved and because the excavation report is held to be inadequate. Worse was a lack of technology to preserve the excavated bodies, which were quickly destroyed after the tomb opened during the first phase of the Cultural Revolution. The failure of the excavation of Dingling has been used as an argument against the opening of the Tang dynasty Qianling Mausoleum and the Mausoleum of the First Qin Emperor.

Lessons learned from the Dingling excavation led to a new policy by the People's Republic of China to not excavate any historical site except for rescue purposes. In particular, no proposal to open an imperial tomb has been approved since Dingling, even when the entrance has been accidentally revealed, as was the case of the Qianling Mausoleum. The original plan, to use Dingling as a trial site for the excavation of Changling, was abandoned.
