= Longqing Emperor =

Emperor of China from 1567 to 1572

Longqing Emperor 隆慶帝
- Palace portrait on a hanging scroll

Emperor of the Ming dynasty
- Reign: 23 January 1567 – 5 July 1572
- Enthronement: 4 February 1567
- Predecessor: Jiajing Emperor
- Successor: Wanli Emperor
- Born: 4 March 1537
- Died: 5 July 1572 (aged 35)
- Burial: Zhao Mausoleum, Ming tombs, Beijing
- Consorts: Empress Xiaoyizhuang (m. 1553; died 1558) Empress Xiao'an (m. 1558) Empress Dowager Xiaoding (m. 1560)
- Issue Detail: Wanli Emperor
Era dates
- Longqing: (Note: Simplified Chinese: 隆庆; traditional Chinese: 隆慶; pinyin: Lóngqìng) 9 February 1567 – 1 February 1573
Posthumous name
- Emperor Qitian Longdao Yuanyi Kuanren Xianwen Guangwu Chunde Hongxiao Zhuang (Note: Simplified Chinese: 契天隆道渊懿宽仁显文光武纯德弘孝庄皇帝; traditional Chinese: 契天隆道淵懿寬仁顯文光武純德弘孝莊皇帝 (conferred by the Wanli Emperor in 1572))
Temple name
- Muzong (Note: Chinese: 穆宗; pinyin: Mùzōng)
- House: Zhu
- Dynasty: Ming
- Father: Jiajing Emperor
- Mother: Lady Du

Chinese name
- Traditional Chinese: 隆慶帝
- Simplified Chinese: 隆庆帝
Transcriptions
Standard Mandarin
- Hanyu Pinyin: Lóngqìng Dì
- Wade–Giles: Lung^{2}-chʻing^{4} Ti^{4}
- IPA: [lʊ̌ŋ.tɕʰîŋ tî]

The Longqing Emperor (4 March 1537 – 5 July 1572), personal name Zhu Zaiji, (Note: Simplified Chinese: 朱载坖; traditional Chinese: 朱載坖; pinyin: Zhū Zàijì) (Note: Beginning in the Wanli era, his personal name was also recorded as Zhu Zaihou (朱載垕), and this variant was later adopted by many modern works.) was the 13th emperor of the Ming dynasty of China, reigning from 1567 to 1572. He was initially known as the Prince of Yu from 1539 to 1567 before he became the emperor. He succeeded his father, the Jiajing Emperor.

After the death of the Jiajing Emperor, the Longqing Emperor inherited a country in turmoil due to years of mismanagement and corruption. Recognizing the extent of the chaos caused during his father's lengthy reign, the Emperor worked to restore order in the state administration. He reinstated talented officials who had been previously exiled and dismissed corrupt officials and Taoist priests who had surrounded the Jiajing Emperor. Additionally, he lifted the ban on foreign trade, boosting the empire's economy, and reorganized the border troops to strengthen security on the inland and coastal borders. The seaports of Zhejiang and Fujian were fortified to defend against coastal pirates, who had been a constant nuisance during the previous government. The Emperor also successfully repelled Altan Khan's Mongol army, which had breached the Great Wall and reached Beijing. A peace treaty was signed shortly after, allowing for the resumption of the exchange of horses for silk. Despite a promising start, the Longqing Emperor quickly neglected his duties as a ruler and instead focused on personal pleasures.

== Early life ==
Zhu Zaiji, the future Longqing Emperor, was born on 4 March 1537 to the Jiajing Emperor, the 12th emperor of China's Ming dynasty, and a concubine surnamed Du. He was the Emperor's third son; the eldest son had died in infancy before Zhu Zaiji's birth, and the second son, Zhu Zairui, was six months older than him. A month after Zhu Zaiji's birth, the Emperor's fourth son, Zhu Zaizhen, was born.

In February 1539, the Jiajing Emperor named Zhu Zairui heir to the throne. On the same day, he granted Zhu Zaiji the title of Prince of Yu (裕王) and Zhu Zaizhen the title of Prince of Jing. In 1549, Zhu Zairui died. His death caused the Jiajing Emperor to feel immense sorrow and regret, as he believed he had not listened to the supposed advice of his Taoist priest Tao Zhongwen, who had warned him that "two dragons should not face each other". The "two dragons" referred to the reigning emperor and the heir apparent. This belief may have contributed to his reluctance to designate another heir and his avoidance of contact with Zhu Zaiji. Another version suggests that the Emperor held a grudge against Zhu Zaiji for not observing sexual abstinence during the mourning period (this version was fueled by the fact that Zhu Zaiji had a son in October 1555, only 18 months after his mother's death).

In September 1552, Zhu Zaiji and Zhu Zaizhen began their education together. Two months later, wives were selected for them, and they were married in February 1553. After that, Zhu Zaiji moved from the Forbidden City to his princely palace. For thirteen years, he lived outside the Forbidden City, gaining experience of conditions beyond the Imperial Palace and developing an understanding of the country's issues. The Jiajing Emperor ensured that he and the officials treated the third and fourth sons equally, sparking speculation at court as to who would become his successor. This speculation was further fueled by the Emperor's fondness for Zhu Zaizhen's mother, in whose company he spent much of his time. In contrast, when Zhu Zaiji's mother died in February 1554, the funeral arrangements had to be revised twice, as the Emperor suppressed any suggestion that she held a higher status than just the mother of the presumptive heir.

In March 1560, the Jiajing Emperor received a memorandum suggesting that Zhu Zaiji be appointed as his successor. The Emperor was outraged and ordered the execution of the writer, but later that year, he changed his mind and ordered Zhu Zaizhen to go to his seat in De'an, Huguang. This decision strengthened Zhu Zaiji's position, although he continued to be excluded from the Emperor's entourage and neglected. Unlike the deceased Zhu Zairui, the Emperor did not like him. Despite being 29 years old at the time of his accession to the throne and having a Confucian education, Zhu Zaiji lacked deep knowledge in statesmanship and was not adequately prepared to govern an empire.

== Beginning of reign ==
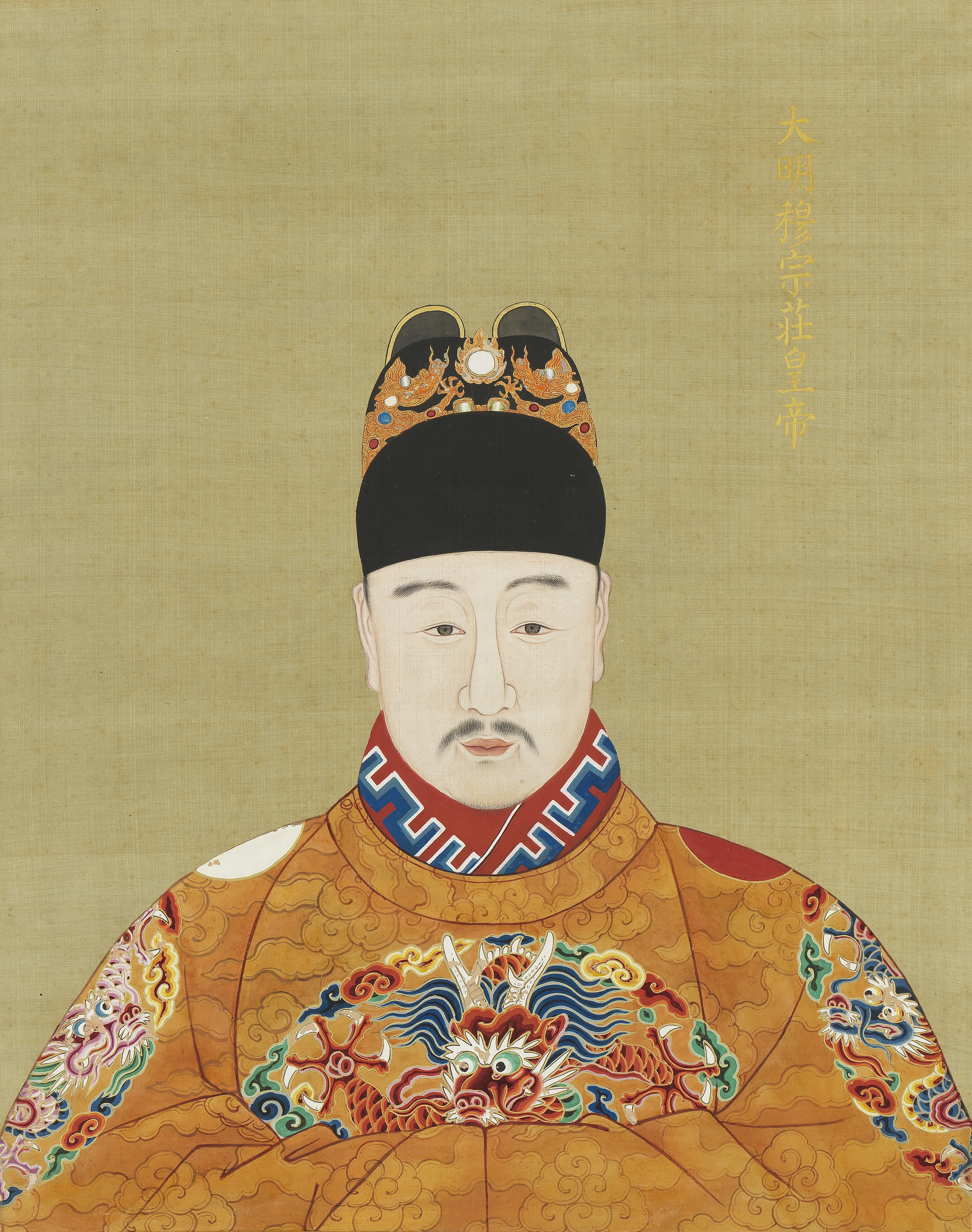
Portrait of the Longqing Emperor

The Jiajing Emperor died on 23 January 1567, and twelve days later, Zhu Zaiji became the new emperor. He adopted the era name Longqing, which means "great celebration".

The reign of the Longqing Emperor began with the implementation of the Jiajing Emperor's "dying orders", which aimed to bring about reform and political change. Senior Grand Secretary Xu Jie, in collaboration with Zhang Juzheng, drafted the "final edict" of the Jiajing Emperor and the first edicts of the Longqing Emperor's reign, which were approved by the Emperor himself. These edicts, with the goal of "removing the bad" and "introducing the new", revoked the unpopular policies of the Jiajing Emperor and introduced long-awaited reforms. The Taoist priests who had held significant influence during the previous era were imprisoned and their rituals were banned. The orders to gather ingredients for their rituals were also cancelled. The area in West Park, which was built by the Jiajing Emperor and modeled after the Taoist Immortal Lands, was dismantled. Officials who had been punished for opposing the policies of the Jiajing Emperor were pardoned and released from prison. Those who were still alive were reinstated to their positions, and those who had died were given posthumous honors. These reforms were generally well-received.

In the long term, the most noteworthy event during the early days of the Longqing era was the selection of Zhang as grand secretary. Zhang had been the Emperor's tutor since 1563, and the Emperor saw him as a man with exceptional abilities. Throughout the Longqing Emperor's reign, Zhang's power and influence increased, and after the Emperor died, he swiftly rose to the position of senior grand secretary. He became the most influential politician in the Ming government for a decade and was considered the most competent administrator of the late Ming dynasty.

In the years that followed, the reforms persisted, with the Longqing Emperor approving changes proposed by experienced statesmen such as Gao Gong, Chen Yiqin, and Zhang. An evaluation was conducted on the government officials, including those from the princely households. Competent officials were promoted, while inadequate ones were removed from their positions. Taxes for those affected by natural disasters were lowered, and land surveys and tax records were updated. Restrictions were placed on certain expenses for the imperial household.

However, Senior Grand Secretary Xu Jie had already rejected cooperation with the grand secretaries Gao Gong and Guo Pu while drafting the Jiajing Emperor's "final edict". Instead, he invited Zhang, who was then the director of the Hanlin Academy. This caused a conflict with his colleagues in the secretariat. A contemporary commentator remarked sadly on this, noting that such capable men were unable to work together for the good of the empire and instead became mortal enemies. The Emperor dismissed Gao from office in summer 1567, and Xu the following year. When Gao returned to office in the early 1570s, he and his followers sought revenge against Xu and his sons.

== Personality ==
The information available about the Longqing Emperor is vague and contradictory. While official history praises his thrift and humanity, it seems that this is simply the usual rhetoric. He was not naturally strong or ambitious, in contrast to his father. He was known for being friendly and kind, and during his reign, there were fewer severe punishments for high officials compared to previous years, but he lacked his father's drive for power, as well as his temper and cruelty. Additionally, he did not possess the same strength of faith in Taoism as his father. The Longqing Emperor also suffered from a speech defect, which caused him to only speak to his eunuchs. In public, he was always silent and even during formal events, his grand secretaries would deliver his lines for him.

The Longqing Emperor was perceived to have average intelligence at best, but he was determined to be taken seriously. He implemented reforms and policy changes during his reign, particularly in relation to the Jiajing Emperor. He was successful in strengthening his government by aligning himself with capable politicians, a rarity during the Ming dynasty. While his minimal involvement in state affairs did not have a negative impact, as competent ministers and grand secretaries were responsible for handling them, it did lead to a power struggle within the Grand Secretariat. The winner of this struggle would have the authority to make final decisions on state matters. Gao, who had been one of the Longqing Emperor's closest mentors during his youth, was able to consolidate power as the head of the Grand Secretariat (and also held the title of minister of personnel) more than any of his predecessors.

Within months of ascending to the throne, the Longqing Emperor became disinterested in matters of state and instead devoted much of his time to extravagant parties with his consorts, indulging in opulence and living extravagantly. It is rumored that he sought entertainment and luxury as a means of compensating for years of neglect and deprivation. Concerned officials began to voice their objections, citing his declining health and exhaustion, both physically and mentally.

== Trade ==
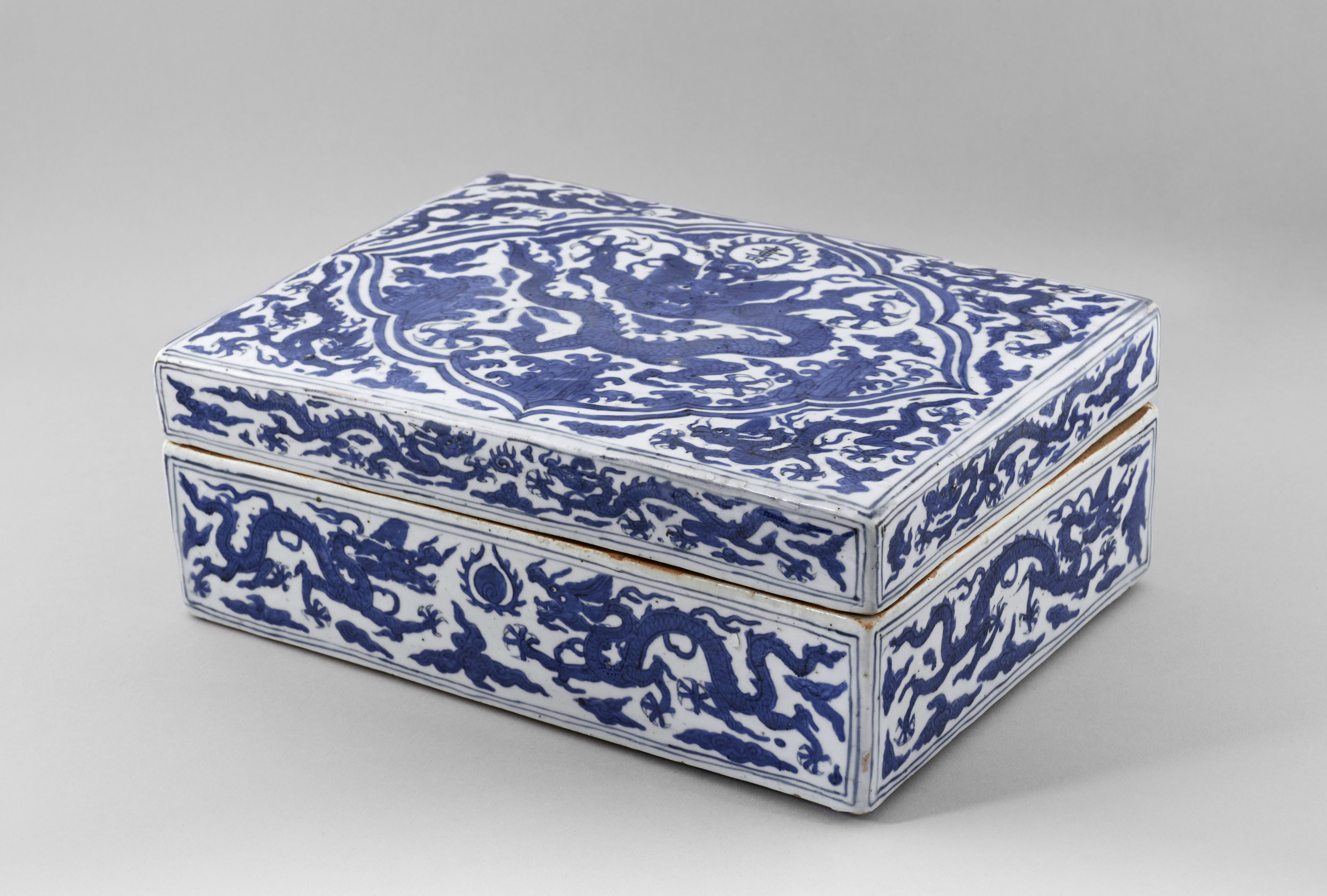
Porcelain box from the Longqing era. Musée Cernuschi

During the Longqing era, the government adopted a more open approach to trade compared to the previous Jiajing regime. In 1567, the grand coordinator of Fujian proposed to abolish the Haijin policy, which was approved by the government and the Emperor. This led to the restoration of maritime inspection offices and the legalization of foreign trade, primarily in Yuegang (Moon Port) in Fujian, but trade with Japan remained prohibited. In addition to the southeast coast, the northern borders were also opened as part of a new reconciliation policy, allowing for trade with the Mongols.

== Financial policy ==
Bronze coins, also known as coppers, were primarily used along the Grand Canal in the mid-16th century, causing a shortage in other areas and hindering trade. In 1567, Minister of Revenue, Ge Shouli (葛守禮), suggested resuming production of these coins due to their importance in the daily lives of urban citizens. He believed that losing control over the currency would also mean losing control over the entire economy, as silver and those who profited from it would dominate. The Ministry of Works rejected the proposal, citing the high cost of casting the coins, which was twice their value. Opponents of the minister argued that the existing coins were sufficient for the limited regions where they were in circulation.

Later, in the years 1569–1570, the Emperor was convinced by Minister of War Tan Lun and Left Vice Minister of Personnel Jin Xueyan (靳學顏) to reopen the mints. They argued that it was necessary to increase the money supply during a silver shortage, as this would lead to a decrease in the price of silver and an increase in the value of goods. They also believed that a medium of exchange was needed to prevent the wealthy from hoarding silver and causing a shortage, and that using silver for payments was disadvantageous for smaller payers. Their proposal was met with opposition from Gao who argued that having two currencies would lead to the state manipulating their exchange rate and causing mistrust among the population. Despite this, the mints were only open for a short period of time, until the death of the Longqing Emperor.

== Military and foreign policy ==
In foreign affairs, the Longqing era was a period of peace. Apart from Guangdong, the pirate raids that devastated China in the Jiajing era subsided. The grand military parade held in the autumn of 1569 was a momentous occasion. The previous parade had taken place in 1429 and the next one would not occur until 1581. As part of the parade, incompetent officers were dismissed and the units underwent rigorous training. Despite the high cost, it greatly boosted the morale of both the soldiers and the onlookers. The parade, which featured a colorful display with the Emperor at its center, was meticulously planned by Zhang, who was dedicated to fortifying border defenses and revitalizing the military. Apart from uplifting the spirits of the troops, the parade also provided a refreshing break from the monotonous palace life for the Emperor.

Immediately after the parade, the Mongol army led by Altan Khan breached the Great Wall and ravaged the northern border regions. Prior to this, there had been fighting in the winter of 1567/68, during which Ming troops not only defended their territory but also made several forays into the Mongolian steppes. In the early 1570s, the Ming dynasty's long-term policy towards the Mongols changed. Gao and Zhang, in addition to strengthening the border troops, pursued a policy of appeasement and negotiated peace with Altan Khan in 1571. As part of the agreement, the Ming dynasty opened border markets where the Mongols could trade their horses and other surplus goods for Chinese goods. Altan Khan was also granted the title of Prince of Shunyi (Obedience and Righteousness) by the Longqing Emperor.

== Death ==
The Emperor died on 5 July 1572 (Note: Sometimes it is stated as 4 July 1572, for example in Dardess, John W.: Ming China, 1368–1644: A Concise History of a Resilient Empire.) at the age of thirty-five. Prior to his death, he entrusted ministers Gao Gong, Zhang Juzheng, and Gao Yi (高儀) to manage state affairs and advise his ten-year-old son, the Wanli Emperor. (Note: Following the Wanli Emperor's accession, Gao Gong was forced to retire by an alliance between Zhang Juzheng and the eunuch Feng Bao. Gao Yi died of illness soon after. With Gao's removal, Zhang effectively took control of the government and remained in power until his death in 1582.) The Longqing Emperor was buried in Zhao Mausoleum, one of the Ming tombs located near Beijing. He was given the posthumous name Emperor Zhuang (莊帝) and the temple name Muzong (穆宗).

== Family ==
The Longqing Emperor had four sons and seven daughters. His first son, Zhu Yiyi, was born to his first wife, Lady Li. His second son died as an infant. The third son, Zhu Yijun, inherited the throne. The fourth son, Zhu Yiliu, held the title of Prince of Lu and resided in Weihui, Henan. Both Zhu Yijun and Zhu Yiliu were born to a concubine surnamed Li. Out of the seven daughters, only four survived into adulthood.

- Empress Xiaoyizhuang (孝懿莊皇后) of the Li clan (李氏; d. 1558)
  - Zhu Yiyi (朱翊釴), Crown Prince Xianhuai (憲懷皇太子; October 1555 – May 1559), first son
  - Princess Penglai (蓬萊公主), first daughter
- Empress Xiao'an (孝安皇后) of the Chen clan (陳氏; d. 1596)
- Empress Dowager Xiaoding (孝定皇太后) of the Li clan (李氏; 1545 – 18 March 1614)
  - Zhu Yijun (朱翊鈞), the Wanli Emperor (萬曆帝; 1563–1620), third son
  - Princess Shouyang (壽陽公主), personal name Yao'e (堯娥), third daughter. Married in 1581 to Hou Gongchen (侯拱辰).
  - Princess Yongning (永寧公主; d. 1594), personal name Yaoying (堯媖), fourth daughter. Married in 1582 to Liang Bangrui (梁邦瑞).
  - Zhu Yiliu (朱翊鏐), Prince Jian of Lu (潞簡王; 1568–1614), fourth son
  - Princess Rui'an (瑞安公主), personal name Yaoyuan (堯媛), fifth daughter. Married in 1585 to Wan Wei (萬煒; d. 1644).
- Consort Zhaoshunying (昭順英妃) of the Wei clan (魏氏; d. 1575)
- Consort Duanshunshu (端順淑妃) of the Qin clan (秦氏)
  - Princess Qixia (棲霞公主), personal name Yaolu (堯𡞱), seventh daughter
- Consort Gonghuizhuang (恭惠莊妃) of the Liu clan (劉氏; d. 1582)
- Consort Zhuangxirong (莊僖榮妃) of the Wang clan (王氏; d. 1580)
- Consort Yongkede (榮恪德妃) of the Li clan (李氏; d. 1632)
- Consort Zhaohuiduan (昭惠端妃) of the Dong clan (董氏)
- Consort Duankehui (端恪惠妃) of the Ma clan (馬氏; d. 1640)
- Consort Gongjinghe (恭靜和妃) of the Zhao clan (趙氏; d. 1581)
- Consort Yongdaoan (榮悼安妃) of the Yang clan (楊氏; d. 1576)
- Consort Kangjingrong (康靖容妃) of the Han clan (韓氏; d. 1630)
- Consort Zhaojingjing (昭靖敬妃) of the Zhuang clan (莊氏; d. 1580)
- Consort Zhaoronggong (昭榮恭妃) of the Li clan (李氏; d. 1577)
- Consort Duanhuiyi (懿妃) of the Yu clan (于氏)
- Consort Zhaoyiqi (昭懿奇妃) of the Ye clan (葉氏; d. 1621)
- Consort Zhenhuixian (貞恵賢妃) of the Jiang clan (江氏)
- Unknown
  - Zhu Yiling (朱翊鈴), Prince Dao of Jing (靖悼王), second son
  - Princess Taihe (太和公主), second daughter
  - Princess Yanqing (延慶公主), personal name Yaoji (堯姬), sixth daughter. Married in 1587 to Wang Bing (王昺).

== See also ==
- Chinese emperors family tree (late)

== Notes ==
Longqing Emperor House of Zhu Born: 4 March 1537 Died: 5 July 1572
Regnal titles
Preceded by Jiajing Emperor	Emperor of the Ming dynasty 23 January 1567 – 5 July 1572	Succeeded by Wanli Emperor
Chinese royalty
New creation	Prince of Yu; March 1539 – 23 January 1567	Merged into the Crown
