= List of posthumous names =

In China, posthumous names were conferred upon Emperors, Empresses, and notable officials by the imperial court up until the fall of Qing dynasty in 1911. The following list is limited to officials. The name is most often used in the combination surname + posthumous name + "gong 公," as appears in all formal references.

During Ming and Qing dynasties, posthumous names of officials were formalized and fixed at two characters. The first character Wen 文 was typically only given to those who had obtained Jinshi degree and served in the Hanlin Academy. Among all posthumous names, Wenzheng 文正 was considered the most prestigious, followed by Wenzhong 文忠, etc.

== Terms used in posthumous names ==
The "Rules for Posthumous Names" section of the Lost Book of Zhou features an elaborate explanation of the terms used in posthumous names. Entries are sorted according to alphabetical order based on pinyin romanization.

Praises (上諡)
Neutral terms (中諡)
Deprecations (下諡)

Term	Meaning / origin	Original explanation in Classical Chinese	Translated explanation in English
哀 Āi	"Lamentable"	蚤孤短折曰哀	One who loses their spouse and passes away at an early age is called "lamentable"
哀 Āi	"Lamentable"	恭仁短折曰哀	One who is cautious and benevolent but passes away at an early age is called "lamentable"
哀 Āi	"Lamentable"	德之不建曰哀	One who is immoral is called "lamentable"
哀 Āi	"Lamentable"	遭難已甚曰哀	One who experiences tremendous misery is called "lamentable"
哀 Āi	"Lamentable"	處死非義曰哀	One who dies of unnatural causes is called "lamentable"
安 Ān	"Peaceful"	好和不爭曰安	One who values peace and does not seek confrontation is called "peaceful"
安 Ān	"Peaceful"	兆民寧賴曰安	One who brings peace to the society is called "peaceful"
安 Ān	"Peaceful"	寬容平和曰安	One who is tolerant and gentle is called "peaceful"
安 Ān	"Peaceful"	寬裕和平曰安	One who is affluent and harmonious is called "peaceful"
安 Ān	"Peaceful"	所保惟賢曰安	One who respects virtuous individuals is called "peaceful"
安 Ān	"Peaceful"	中心宅仁曰安	One who is kind and benevolent is called "peaceful"
安 Ān	"Peaceful"	修己寧民曰安	One who self-cultivates and brings stability to the society is called "peaceful"
安 Ān	"Peaceful"	務德不爭曰安	One who upholds morality and does not seek confrontation is called "peaceful"
安 Ān	"Peaceful"	莊敬盡禮曰安	One who is respectful and spares no effort in abiding rituals is called "peaceful"
安 Ān	"Peaceful"	敬而有禮曰安	One who is respectful and polite is called "peaceful"
安 Ān	"Peaceful"	貌肅辭定曰安	One who dresses adequately and speaks respectfully is called "peaceful"
安 Ān	"Peaceful"	止於義理曰安	One who pursues righteousness and principles is called "peaceful"
安 Ān	"Peaceful"	恭德不勞曰安	One who is courteous and does not trouble others is called "peaceful"
安 Ān	"Peaceful"	靜正不遷曰安	One who is calm and does not enforce changes wilfully is called "peaceful"
安 Ān	"Peaceful"	懿恭中禮曰安	One who is courteous and upholds rituals adequately is called "peaceful"
安 Ān	"Peaceful"	凝重合禮曰安	One who is dignified and abides by proper rituals is called "peaceful"
比 Bǐ	"Emulous"	擇善而從曰比	One who learns from and performs kind deeds is called "emulous"
比 Bǐ	"Emulous"	事君有黨曰比	One who identifies with those congenial is called "emulous"
成 Chéng	"Accomplished"	安民立政曰成	One who brings peace to the society and establishes principles for politics is called "accomplished"
成 Chéng	"Accomplished"	刑民克服曰成	One who executes law to establish societal order is called "accomplished"
成 Chéng	"Accomplished"	佐相克終曰成	One who assists others and achieves great results is called "accomplished"
成 Chéng	"Accomplished"	制義克服曰成	One who establishes hierarchy and societal order is called "accomplished"
成 Chéng	"Accomplished"	禮樂明具曰成	One who establishes rituals is called "accomplished"
成 Chéng	"Accomplished"	持盈守滿曰成	One who achieves great deeds but remains true to inherent qualities is called "accomplished"
成 Chéng	"Accomplished"	遂物之美曰成	One who achieves beautiful outcomes is called "accomplished"
成 Chéng	"Accomplished"	通達強立曰成	One who is powerful and upright is called "accomplished"
成 Chéng	"Accomplished"	經德秉德曰成	One who is wise, brave, restraint and righteous is called "accomplished"
成 Chéng	"Accomplished"	民和神福曰成	One who brings peace to the society and is worthy of divine protection is called "accomplished"
成 Chéng	"Accomplished"	道兼聖智曰成	One who is wise and conscious is called "accomplished"
成 Chéng	"Accomplished"	夙夜警戒曰成	One who is incessantly prudent is called "accomplished"
成 Chéng	"Accomplished"	曲直赴禮曰成	One who upholds rituals without excuse is called "accomplished"
成 Chéng	"Accomplished"	仁化純被曰成	One who is enlightened and pure is called "accomplished"
成 Chéng	"Accomplished"	不忘久要曰成	One who honors promises is called "accomplished"
成 Chéng	"Accomplished"	德備禮樂曰成	One who is moral and abides by rituals is called "accomplished"
成 Chéng	"Accomplished"	德見於行曰成	One who acts morally is called "accomplished"
成 Chéng	"Accomplished"	久道化隆曰成	One who advocates great enlightenment is called "accomplished"
成 Chéng	"Accomplished"	內德純備曰成	One who is spiritually pure and perfect is called "accomplished"
成 Chéng	"Accomplished"	坤寧化洽曰成	One who is tranquil and enlightened is called "accomplished"
誠 Chéng	"Sincere"	純德合天曰誠	One whose purity and morality conform to natural principles is called "sincere"
誠 Chéng	"Sincere"	從容中道曰誠	One who pursues moderation is called "sincere"
誠 Chéng	"Sincere"	推心御物曰誠	One who is honest about treasured thoughts is called "sincere"
誠 Chéng	"Sincere"	秉德純一曰誠	One who is virtuous and pure is called "sincere"
誠 Chéng	"Sincere"	明信率下曰誠	One who leads subordinates with earnest respect is called "sincere"
誠 Chéng	"Sincere"	肫篤無欺曰誠	One who is faithful and truthful is called "sincere"
誠 Chéng	"Sincere"	實心施惠曰誠	One who is genuinely charitable is called "sincere"
沖 Chōng	"Otiose"	幼少在位曰沖	One who reigns at an early age is called "otiose"
沖 Chōng	"Otiose"	幼少短折曰沖	One who passes away at an early age is called "otiose"
崇 Chóng	"Lofty"	能修其官曰崇	One who is competent in fulfilling responsibilities is called "lofty"
純 Chún	"Pure"	中正精粹曰純	One who is impartial, upright and unsullied is called "pure"
純 Chún	"Pure"	見素抱樸曰純	One who entrusts venerable individuals with governance and promotes nomocracy is called "pure"
純 Chún	"Pure"	安危一心曰純	One who focuses on creating peace and stability is called "pure"
純 Chún	"Pure"	志慮忠實曰純	One whose aspirations and thoughts are faithful is called "pure"
純 Chún	"Pure"	至誠無息曰純	One whose beliefs are perennial is called "pure"
純 Chún	"Pure"	內心和一曰純	One whose inner thoughts are non-conflicting is called "pure"
純 Chún	"Pure"	治理精粹曰純	One who governs with unsullied intent is called "pure"
慈 Cí	"Merciful"	視民如子曰慈	One who regards subjects as sons is called "merciful"
慈 Cí	"Merciful"	愛育必周曰慈	One who meticulously care and educate is called "merciful"
慈 Cí	"Merciful"	撫柔平恕曰慈	One who is gentle and benevolent is called "merciful"
聰 Cōng	"Intelligent"	聲入心通曰聰	One who is able to comprehend the advice of venerable individuals is called "intelligent"
聰 Cōng	"Intelligent"	邇言必察曰聰	One who heeds the advice of those on intimate terms is called "intelligent"
達 Dá	"Unprejudiced"	質直好義曰達	One who is upright and righteous is called "unprejudiced"
達 Dá	"Unprejudiced"	疏通中理曰達	One who is impartial is called "unprejudiced"
大 Dà	"Great"	則天法堯曰大	One who follows heavenly principles and the ways of Yao is called "great"
戴 Dài	"Esteemed"	愛民好治曰戴	One who cares for subjects and promotes good governance is called "esteemed"
戴 Dài	"Esteemed"	典禮不愆曰戴	One who abides by rituals and does not err is called "esteemed"
蕩 Dàng	"Dissolute"	好內遠禮曰蕩	One who frequently patronizes concubines and does not abide by rituals is called "dissolute"
蕩 Dàng	"Dissolute"	狂而無據曰蕩	One who is uncultured and unrestrained is called "dissolute"
悼 Dào	"Mournful"	肆行勞祀曰悼	One who behaves wantonly with no regard for rituals is called "mournful"
悼 Dào	"Mournful"	中年早夭曰悼	One who passes away prematurely is called "mournful"
悼 Dào	"Mournful"	恐懼從處曰悼	One who is vicious and causes the decline of the state is called "mournful"
悼 Dào	"Mournful"	未中早夭曰悼	One who passes away at an early age is called "mournful"
道 Dào	"Principled"	以德化民曰道	One who governs with kindness is called "principled"
德 Dé	"Virtuous"	綏柔士民曰德	One who appeases the literati is called "virtuous"
德 Dé	"Virtuous"	諫爭不威曰德	One who highlights the mistakes of others and urges their correction but is not haughty is called "virtuous"
德 Dé	"Virtuous"	謀慮不威曰德	One who is meticulous but not haughty is called "virtuous"
德 Dé	"Virtuous"	貴而好禮曰德	One who is patrician but not conceited and impertinent is called "virtuous"
德 Dé	"Virtuous"	忠和純備曰德	One who is loyal, peaceful and pure is called "virtuous"
德 Dé	"Virtuous"	綏懷來人曰德	One who appeases and shows concern for visitors is called "virtuous"
德 Dé	"Virtuous"	強直溫柔曰德	One who is unyielding, upright and tender is called "virtuous"
德 Dé	"Virtuous"	勤恤民隱曰德	One who shows concern for the people's sufferings is called "virtuous"
德 Dé	"Virtuous"	忠誠上實曰德	One who is loyal and honest is called "virtuous"
德 Dé	"Virtuous"	輔世長民曰德	One who assists the ruler in governance is called "virtuous"
德 Dé	"Virtuous"	寬眾憂役曰德	One who is lenient and merciful is called "virtuous"
德 Dé	"Virtuous"	剛塞簡廉曰德	One who leads a simple and incorrupt life is called "virtuous"
德 Dé	"Virtuous"	惠和純淑曰德	One who is compassionate and kind is called "virtuous"
德 Dé	"Virtuous"	富貴好禮曰德	One who is affluent but not conceited and impertinent is called "virtuous"
德 Dé	"Virtuous"	功成民用曰德	One who accomplishes great deeds for the society is called "virtuous"
德 Dé	"Virtuous"	修文來遠曰德	One whose civil governance attracts foreigners from afar is called "virtuous"
德 Dé	"Virtuous"	睿智日新曰德	One who is farsighted and stays abreast of developments is called "virtuous"
德 Dé	"Virtuous"	善政養民曰德	One who governs ethically and fosters societal stability is called "virtuous"
德 Dé	"Virtuous"	尊賢親親曰德	One who respects and cherishes exemplary individuals is called "virtuous"
德 Dé	"Virtuous"	仁而有化曰德	One who is benevolent and enlightened is called "virtuous"
德 Dé	"Virtuous"	憂在進賢曰德	One who is interested in entrusting venerable individuals with governance is called "virtuous"
德 Dé	"Virtuous"	寬栗擾毅曰德	One who is generous and persistent is called "virtuous"
德 Dé	"Virtuous"	直溫強義曰德	One who is upright, gentle and righteous is called "virtuous"
德 Dé	"Virtuous"	諫諍不違曰德	One who highlights the mistakes of others and urges their correction is called "virtuous"
德 Dé	"Virtuous"	周旋中禮曰德	One whose actions and grooming conform to rituals is called "virtuous"
德 Dé	"Virtuous"	澤及遐外曰德	One who bestows grace on uncultured and foreign peoples is called "virtuous"
德 Dé	"Virtuous"	懿修罔懈曰德	One who behaves morally without negligence is called "virtuous"
丁 Dīng	"Unscrupulous"	述善不克曰丁	One who is unfilial is called "unscrupulous"
丁 Dīng	"Unscrupulous"	述義不悌曰丁	One who talks about morality but does not act accordingly is called "unscrupulous"
丁 Dīng	"Unscrupulous"	迷而不悌曰丁	One who does not rectify mistakes is called "unscrupulous"
鼎 Dǐng	"Outstanding"	追改前過曰鼎	One who identifies and rectifies prior mistakes is called "outstanding"
定 Dìng	"Resolute"	大慮靜民曰定	One who ponders the means to achieve socio-psychological stability is called "resolute"
定 Dìng	"Resolute"	安民大慮曰定	One who ponders the means to achieve socio-economic stability is called "resolute"
定 Dìng	"Resolute"	純行不爽曰定	One who is morally upright without negligence is called "resolute"
定 Dìng	"Resolute"	安民法古曰定	One who emulates the ancestors in creating societal stability is called "resolute"
定 Dìng	"Resolute"	純行不二曰定	One whose actions do not deviate from moral principles is called "resolute"
定 Dìng	"Resolute"	追補前過曰定	One who makes up for prior mistakes is called "resolute"
定 Dìng	"Resolute"	仁能一眾曰定	One who treats all with benevolence is called "resolute"
定 Dìng	"Resolute"	嗣成武功曰定	One who inherits military accomplishments from prior individuals is called "resolute"
定 Dìng	"Resolute"	踐行不爽曰定	One who performs duties without negligence is called "resolute"
定 Dìng	"Resolute"	審於事情曰定	One who investigates issues prudently is called "resolute"
定 Dìng	"Resolute"	德操純固曰定	One whose morality and ethics are unwavering is called "resolute"
定 Dìng	"Resolute"	以勞定國曰定	One who works tirelessly for national stability is called "resolute"
定 Dìng	"Resolute"	克綏邦家曰定	One who brings peace to the state is called "resolute"
定 Dìng	"Resolute"	靜正無為曰定	One who is pure, upright and follows natural principles is called "resolute"
定 Dìng	"Resolute"	大應慈仁曰定	One who is merciful and benevolent is called "resolute"
定 Dìng	"Resolute"	義安中外曰定	One who governs morally and brings peace to China and beyond is called "resolute"
定 Dìng	"Resolute"	鎮靜守度曰定	One who is calm and abides by law is called "resolute"
度 Dù	"Lawful"	心能制義曰度	One who is able to render apposite judgment is called "lawful"
度 Dù	"Lawful"	進退可軌曰度	One whose actions are legally appropriate is called "lawful"
度 Dù	"Lawful"	守法緯民曰度	One who governs based on legal principles is called "lawful"
度 Dù	"Lawful"	從容有常曰度	One whose actions are customary is called "lawful"
度 Dù	"Lawful"	禮儀咨善曰度	One whose actions are informed by morality is called "lawful"
度 Dù	"Lawful"	寬裕有容曰度	One who is magnanimous and welcoming is called "lawful"
度 Dù	"Lawful"	創制垂法曰度	One who establishes principles and regulations is called "lawful"
度 Dù	"Lawful"	懿徽足式曰度	One whose virtuous actions are models for future generations is called "lawful"
端 Duān	"Upright"	守禮執義曰端	One who abides by rituals and moral code is called "upright"
端 Duān	"Upright"	聖修式化曰端	One who self-cultivates according to virtuous principles is called "upright"
端 Duān	"Upright"	嚴恭蒞下曰端	One who leads subordinates with dignity and respect is called "upright"
端 Duān	"Upright"	恭己有容曰端	One who is respectful and magnanimous is called "upright"
端 Duān	"Upright"	秉心貞靜曰端	One who handles issues faithfully and calmly is called "upright"
端 Duān	"Upright"	守禮自重曰端	One who abides by rituals and respects oneself is called "upright"
敦 Dūn	"Altruistic"	善行不怠曰敦	One who performs kind deeds without negligence is called "altruistic"
敦 Dūn	"Altruistic"	溫仁忠厚曰敦	One who is benevolent and loyal is called "altruistic"
敦 Dūn	"Altruistic"	能記國善曰敦	One who is aware of the positive aspects of the state is called "altruistic"
敦 Dūn	"Altruistic"	溫仁厚下曰敦	One who is benevolent to subordinates is called "altruistic"
敦 Dūn	"Altruistic"	篤親睦族曰敦	One who cultivates harmonious relationships with family members and friends is called "altruistic"
敦 Dūn	"Altruistic"	樹德純固曰敦	One whose virtuous behaviors are unwavering is called "altruistic"
干 Gàn	"Unruly"	犯國之紀曰干	One who violates national law is called "unruly"
剛 Gāng	"Undaunted"	追補前過曰剛	One who makes up for prior mistakes is called "undaunted"
剛 Gāng	"Undaunted"	強毅果敢曰剛	One who is tenacious and courageous is called "undaunted"
剛 Gāng	"Undaunted"	致果殺敵曰剛	One who valiantly battles enemies is called "undaunted"
剛 Gāng	"Undaunted"	強而能斷曰剛	One who is powerful and not impressionable is called "undaunted"
剛 Gāng	"Undaunted"	自強不息曰剛	One who is unwavering in pursuing self-improvement is called "undaunted"
剛 Gāng	"Undaunted"	政刑明斷曰剛	One who decisively enforces law and implements punishment is called "undaunted"
剛 Gāng	"Undaunted"	威強不屈曰剛	One who does not yield in the face of brutality is called "undaunted"
剛 Gāng	"Undaunted"	強義果敢曰剛	One who is righteous and courageous is called "undaunted"
高 Gāo	"High"	德覆萬物曰高	One who treats all virtuously is called "high"
高 Gāo	"High"	功德盛大曰高	One whose merit is lofty is called "high"
高 Gāo	"High"	覆幬同天曰高	One whose bestowed grace is equivalent to that of the heaven is called "high"
革 Gé	"Revolutionary"	獻敏成行曰革	One who advances proposition is called "revolutionary"
公 Gōng	"Selfless"	立志及眾曰公	One who aspires to serve public interests is called "selfless"
恭 Gōng	"Deferential"	尊賢貴義曰恭	One who respects exemplary individuals and prioritizes morality is called "deferential"
恭 Gōng	"Deferential"	敬事供上曰恭	One who is meticulous in actions and respects superiors is called "deferential"
恭 Gōng	"Deferential"	尊賢敬讓曰恭	One who respects exemplary individuals and is modest is called "deferential"
恭 Gōng	"Deferential"	既過能改曰恭	One who rectifies prior mistakes is called "deferential"
恭 Gōng	"Deferential"	執事堅固曰恭	One who is steadfast is called "deferential"
恭 Gōng	"Deferential"	愛民長弟曰恭	One who cares for subjects in the same way as elders care for juniors is called "deferential"
恭 Gōng	"Deferential"	執禮御賓曰恭	One who is courteous to guests is called "deferential"
恭 Gōng	"Deferential"	芘親之闕曰恭	One who tolerates the mistakes of family members is called "deferential"
恭 Gōng	"Deferential"	尊長讓善曰恭	One who respects elders and promotes kindness is called "deferential"
恭 Gōng	"Deferential"	淵源流通曰恭	One who has no desire is called "deferential"
恭 Gōng	"Deferential"	夙夜敬事曰恭	One who works tirelessly is called "deferential"
恭 Gōng	"Deferential"	知過能改曰恭	One who owns up to and rectifies mistakes is called "deferential"
恭 Gōng	"Deferential"	賢而不伐曰恭	One who is proficient but not conceited is called "deferential"
恭 Gōng	"Deferential"	率事以信曰恭	One who assumes good faith while handling issues is called "deferential"
恭 Gōng	"Deferential"	不懈於位曰恭	One who does not neglect duties is called "deferential"
恭 Gōng	"Deferential"	卑以自牧曰恭	One who is modest is called "deferential"
恭 Gōng	"Deferential"	不懈於德曰恭	One who does not neglect the pursuit of morality is called "deferential"
恭 Gōng	"Deferential"	治典不易曰恭	One who does not deviate from national law is called "deferential"
恭 Gōng	"Deferential"	責難於君曰恭	One who does not embarrass and discommode the ruler is called "deferential"
恭 Gōng	"Deferential"	正德美容曰恭	One who behaves virtuously and dresses adequately is called "deferential"
恭 Gōng	"Deferential"	不懈為德曰恭	One who does not neglect moral actions is called "deferential"
恭 Gōng	"Deferential"	正己接物曰恭	One who treats others with respect is called "deferential"
恭 Gōng	"Deferential"	昭事不忒曰恭	One who is diligent and does not err is called "deferential"
恭 Gōng	"Deferential"	勤恤民隱曰恭	One who is attentive to people's sufferings is called "deferential"
恭 Gōng	"Deferential"	莊以蒞下曰恭	One who treats subordinates with dignity is called "deferential"
恭 Gōng	"Deferential"	謙和不懈曰恭	One who is modest, gentle and not negligent is called "deferential"
恭 Gōng	"Deferential"	遜順事上曰恭	One who is modest and obedient to elders is called "deferential"
光 Guāng	"Brilliant"	功格上下曰光	One whose accomplishments rival that of heaven and earth is called "brilliant"
光 Guāng	"Brilliant"	能紹前業曰光	One who is worthy of succeeding the achievements of ancestors is called "brilliant"
光 Guāng	"Brilliant"	居上能謙曰光	One who accomplishes greater feats than predecessors but remains modest is called "brilliant"
光 Guāng	"Brilliant"	功烈耿著曰光	One whose accomplishments are meritorious and noteworthy is called "brilliant"
廣 Guǎng	"Magnificent"	美化及遠曰廣	One whose great deeds have far-reaching impact is called "magnificent"
廣 Guǎng	"Magnificent"	所聞能行曰廣	One who is competent in emulating all things is called "magnificent"
果 Guǒ	"Motivated"	好力致勇曰果	One who is vigorous and courageous is called "motivated"
果 Guǒ	"Motivated"	好學近智曰果	One who is studious is called "motivated"
果 Guǒ	"Motivated"	臨事善斷曰果	One who is decisive in handling issues is called "motivated"
暠 Hào	"Bright"	綜善典法曰暠	One who is familiar with ordinances and regulations is called "bright"
和 Hé	"Moderate"	不剛不柔曰和	One who is neither overly unrelenting nor lenient is called "moderate"
和 Hé	"Moderate"	推賢讓能曰和	One who promotes venerable individuals and yields to qualified individuals is called "moderate"
和 Hé	"Moderate"	柔遠能邇曰和	One who wins over the people and treats them virtuously is called "moderate"
和 Hé	"Moderate"	號令悅民曰和	One whose policies confer satisfaction to the people is called "moderate"
和 Hé	"Moderate"	敦睦九族曰和	One who cultivates harmonious relationships among members of the nine grades of relations is called "moderate"
和 Hé	"Moderate"	懷柔胥洽曰和	One who appeases and cultivates harmonious relationships among the people is called "moderate"
和 Hé	"Moderate"	溫厚無苛曰和	One who is good-natured and does not treat others ruthlessly is called "moderate"
厚 Hòu	"Kind"	思慮不爽曰厚	One who considers meticulously and is uncorrupted is called "kind"
厚 Hòu	"Kind"	強毅敦樸曰厚	One who perseveres in maintaining honesty and simplicity is called "kind"
厚 Hòu	"Kind"	敦仁愛眾曰厚	One who is good-natured and shows care for others is called "kind"
胡 Hú	"Long-lived"	彌年壽考曰胡	One who lives to old age is called "long-lived"
胡 Hú	"Long-lived"	保民耆艾曰胡	One who ensures societal stability and the welfare of the elders is called "long-lived"
胡 Hú	"Long-lived"	保民畏懼曰胡	One who protects the people from terror is called "long-lived"
懷 Huái	"Yearned"	執義揚善曰懷	One who persists in performing moral deeds is called "yearned"
懷 Huái	"Yearned"	慈仁短折曰懷	One who is benevolent but passes away at an early age is called "yearned"
懷 Huái	"Yearned"	慈仁知節曰懷	One who is benevolent and understands etiquette is called "yearned"
懷 Huái	"Yearned"	失位而死曰懷	One who loses the rightful position and passes away as a result is called "yearned"
懷 Huái	"Yearned"	慈仁哲行曰懷	One who is benevolent and behaves rationally is called "yearned"
懷 Huái	"Yearned"	民思其惠曰懷	One whose good deeds are remembered by the people is called "yearned"
桓 Huán	"Fabled"	闢土服遠曰桓	One who expands the territories and pacifies those living afar is called "fabled"
桓 Huán	"Fabled"	克敬勤民曰桓	One who is respectful and serves the people diligently is called "fabled"
桓 Huán	"Fabled"	闢土兼國曰桓	One who expands the territories and conquers other states is called "fabled"
桓 Huán	"Fabled"	武定四方曰桓	One who pacifies the world through military might is called "fabled"
桓 Huán	"Fabled"	克亟成功曰桓	One who repeatedly resolves problems is called "fabled"
桓 Huán	"Fabled"	克敵服遠曰桓	One who defeats enemies and pacifies those living afar is called "fabled"
桓 Huán	"Fabled"	能成武志曰桓	One who achieves military aspirations is called "fabled"
桓 Huán	"Fabled"	壯以有力曰桓	One who is powerful and mighty is called "fabled"
荒 Huāng	"Unrestrained"	凶年無榖曰荒	One who rules over a period of no harvest is called "unrestrained"
荒 Huāng	"Unrestrained"	外內從亂曰荒	One who induces external threats and internal rebellions is called "unrestrained"
荒 Huāng	"Unrestrained"	好樂怠政曰荒	One who indulges in pleasures and neglects governance is called "unrestrained"
荒 Huāng	"Unrestrained"	昏亂紀度曰荒	One who disregards established rules is called "unrestrained"
荒 Huāng	"Unrestrained"	從樂不反曰荒	One who indulges in pleasures and shows no sign of reflection is called "unrestrained"
荒 Huāng	"Unrestrained"	狎侮五常曰荒	One who is frivolous and disregards moral principles is called "unrestrained"
徽 Huī	"Wonderful"	元德充美曰徽	One who is moral and exhibits sagely characteristics is called "wonderful"

== Wen 文 ==
- Wen 文
  - Han Yu 韓愈
  - Bai Juyi 白居易
  - Wang Anshi 王安石
  - Zhu Xi 朱熹
- Wencheng 文成
  - Liu Ji 劉基
  - Wang Yangming 王阳明
- Wending 文定
  - Liu Kezhuang 劉克莊
  - Shen Shixing 申時行
  - Xu Guangqi 徐光啟
- Wenhe 文和
  - Zhang Tingyu 張廷玉
- Wenmin 文敏
  - Zhao Mengfu 趙孟頫
  - Dong Qichang 董其昌
- Wenxiang 文襄
  - Zuo Zongtang 左宗棠
  - Zhang Zhidong 張之洞
- Wenzhen 文貞
  - Wei Zheng 魏徵
  - Xu Jie 徐階
- Wenzheng 文正
  - Fan Zhongyan 范仲淹
  - Sima Guang 司馬光
  - Xu Heng 許衡
  - Wu Cheng 吳澄
  - Li Dongyang 李東陽
  - Xie Qian 謝遷
  - Zeng Guofan 曾國藩
- Wenzhong 文忠
  - Ouyang Xiu 歐陽修
  - Su Shi 蘇軾
  - Zhang Juzheng 張居正
  - Lin Zexu 林則徐
  - Li Hongzhang 李鴻章

== Wu 武 ==
- Wumu 武穆
  - Yue Fei 岳飛
- Wuning 武寧
  - Xu Da 徐達
- Wulie 武烈
  - Sun Jian 孫堅

== Others ==
- Zhongsu 忠肅
  - Yu Qian 于謙
- Zhongwu 忠武
  - Zhuge Liang 諸葛亮
  - Han Shizhong 韓世忠
  - Chang Yuchun 常遇春
  - Yi Sun-sin 李舜臣
- Zhongzheng 忠正
  - Shi Kefa 史可法
