= Li Chunfang =

Chinese official (1511–1585)

- 李春芳
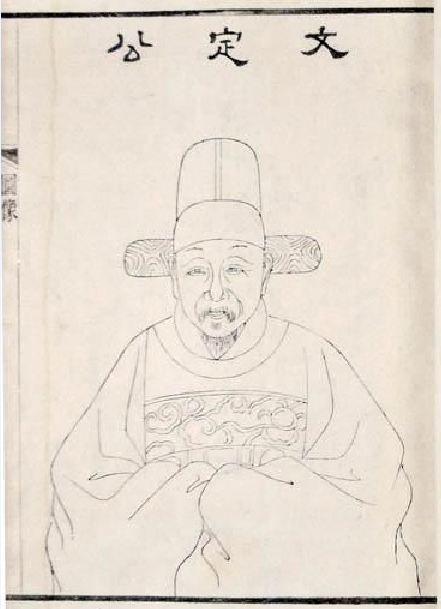

Senior Grand Secretary
- In office 1568–1571
- Monarch: Jiajing
- Preceded by: Xu Jie
- Succeeded by: Gao Gong

Grand Secretary
- In office 1565–1571
- Monarch: Jiajing

Minister of Rites
- In office 1563–1565
- Monarch: Jiajing
- Preceded by: Yan Na
- Succeeded by: Dong Fen

Personal details
- Born: 14 January 1511 Xinghua, Jiangsu
- Died: 18 April 1585 (aged 74)
- Education: jinshi degree (1547)

Chinese name
- Chinese: 李春芳
Transcriptions
Standard Mandarin
- Hanyu Pinyin: Lǐ Chūnfāng

Li Chunfang (Note: Li Chunfang used the courtesy name Zishi (子實) and the art name Shilu (石麓). He was given the posthumous name Wending (文定).) (14 January 1511 – 18 April 1585) was a Chinese scholar-official during the Ming dynasty. He held a high position in the court of the Jiajing Emperor in the mid-16th century, serving as minister of rites from 1563 to 1565. He later became grand secretary and headed the Grand Secretariat from 1568 to 1571.

== Biography ==
Li was born in 1511 during China's Ming dynasty in Xinghua County, in the Southern Metropolitan Area, which is now part of Jiangsu Province. He came from a modest landowning peasant family and received an education in Confucianism. Li was greatly influenced by prominent scholars such as Wang Gen, Lin Chun, Zhan Ruoshui, and Ouyang De. He successfully passed the provincial examination in 1531 and the metropolitan and palace examinations in 1547, earning the rank of jinshi. He excelled in the palace examination, achieving the top score. After his success in the examinations, Li began his career in civil service. In terms of personality, he was known to be soft-spoken, polite, and respectful, never displaying a domineering attitude.

He served at the Hanlin Academy and gained the favor of the Jiajing Emperor in the mid-1550s for his exceptional skill in writing Taoist prayers. He initially taught palace eunuchs and later held the positions of junior minister of the Court of Imperial Sacrifices and vice minister of rites. In 1563, he was promoted to minister of rites, and in May 1565, he was promoted once again to the position of grand secretary. After the resignation of Senior Grand Secretary Xu Jie in 1568, he became the head of the remaining grand secretaries in the Grand Secretariat. At that time, Chen Yiqin and Zhang Juzheng, both appointed in 1567, also served in the Grand Secretariat. In 1571, he resigned from his position and the Grand Secretariat was led by Gao Gong, who had served as grand secretary in 1566–1567 and 1570–1572.
