= 1587, a Year of No Significance =

1981 book by Ray Huang

- Author: Ray Huang
- Language: English
- Subject: History
- Publisher: Yale University Press
- Publication date: 1981
- Publication place: United States
- Media type: Print
- Pages: 278
- ISBN: 978-0-300-02518-7

1587, a Year of No Significance: The Ming Dynasty in Decline (Chinese: 萬曆十五年; pinyin: Wanli Shiwunian) is the most famous work of the Chinese historian Ray Huang. First published by Yale University Press in 1981, it examines how a number of seemingly-insignificant events in 1587 might have caused the downfall of the Ming dynasty.

The Chinese title, meaning "the fifteenth year of the Wanli era", is how the year 1587 was expressed in the Chinese calendar; it is the era name of the reigning Chinese emperor at the time, followed by the year of his reign.

Major figures discussed in the book besides the emperor are Grand Secretaries Zhang Juzheng and Shen Shixing, the official Hai Rui, the general Qi Jiguang, and the philosopher Li Zhi.

Although Huang had completed the manuscript by 1976, no publisher would accept it at first, as it was not serious enough for an academic work but was too serious for popular non-fiction.

The work has been translated into a number of different languages: Mandarin, Japanese, Korean, German, and French.

== Summary ==
The first chapter covers the Wanli Emperor's upbringing, especially his early ascent to the throne, his education under Grand Secretary Zhang Juzheng, and his early rule under the strong guidance of Zhang and the eunuch "Big Companion" Feng Bao. It covers traditions and rituals, including farming rituals and the morning audience, the regular functioning of the Imperial City and the government, and Wanli's marriage and romantic companions. The chapter ends with the death and subsequent condemnation of Grand Secretary Zhang for controlling the Emperor and the government for his own personal gain.

The second chapter focuses on First Grand Secretary Shen Shixing. Through his personal history, Huang illustrates that the typical career path to becoming a Grand Secretary was primarily academic, through the civil service exams and the Hanlin Academy, as opposed to government experience. The ritual of the Emperor's public study session is used to explain how the Imperial government relied primarily on personnel appointments and setting a moral example to inspire good conduct and good governance, as it did not have the resources to maintain order and legitimacy through military power or bureaucratic micromanagement.

== Adaptations ==
1587 was adapted into a play by the Zuni Icosahedron director Mathias Woo, which premièred in Hong Kong in 1999. The second production was in 2006, after Woo and the Towards the Republic screenwriter Zhang Jianwei (張建偉) had rewritten the script by adding a considerable amount of Kun opera and other elements. There was a third run in 2008.
