= Shen Shixing =

Ming dynasty government leader (1535–1614)

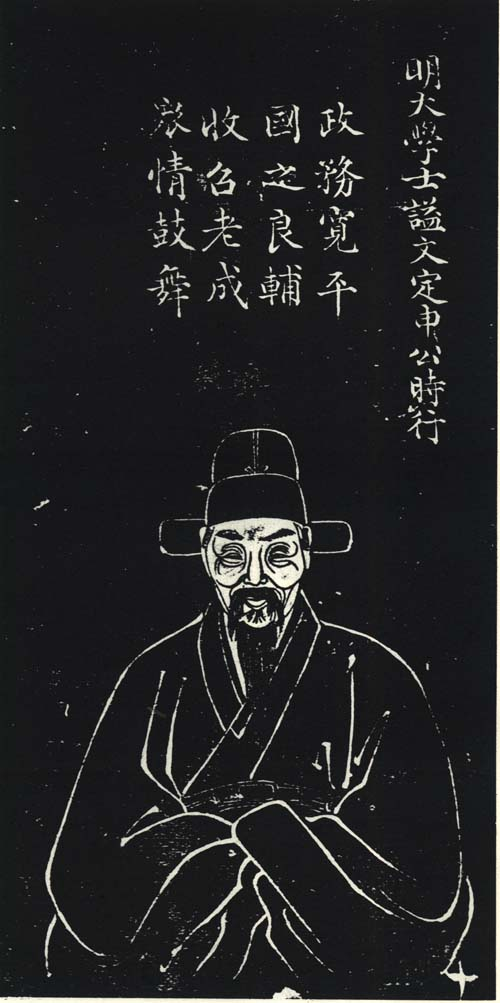

Senior Grand Secretary
- In office 1583–1591
- Monarch: Wanli Emperor
- Preceded by: Zhang Siwei
- Succeeded by: Wang Xijue

Personal details
- Born: 1535
- Died: 1614 (aged 78–79)

Shen Shixing (simplified Chinese: 申时行; traditional Chinese: 申時行; pinyin: Shēn Shíxíng; Wade–Giles: Shen Shih-hsing; 1535 – 1614) was a Ming dynasty Chinese politician, academic, and First Grand Secretary under the Wanli Emperor from 1583 to 1591.

He was born in Changzhou County, South Zhili (present-day Suzhou). With the help of First Grand Secretary Zhang Juzheng, he was appointed as Minister of Rites and then Minister of Personnel. He later became Grand Secretary of the Jianji Hall. After the death of Zhang and the fall of his successor amid great controversy, Shen became the First Grand Secretary (首輔; Shǒufǔ), the de facto Grand Chancellor of the Ming empire, a position he held for eight-and-a-half years. In this role, Shen served as the primary channel of communication between the Emperor and the civil service, while also serving as the emperor's personal tutor in public study sessions. During his tenure as First Grand Secretary, Shen was the personally closest civil servant or academic to the Wanli Emperor, having lectured before the emperor more often than any other academic, among other distinctions. Shen also took part in the drafting of the Collected Statutes of the Ming Dynasty.

== Education and rise ==
Shen Shixing came from Suzhou, then part of Nanzhili, the southern capital region of the Ming empire surrounding the original dynastic capital at Nanjing. At the 1562 palace examinations, Shen Shixing placed first of 299 successful candidates. He was assigned to the Hanlin Academy, the imperial academic institution, where he worked for 15 years. Among his responsibilities were scholarly work on the Confucian classics, especially the Four Books, as well as lecturing the emperor in public study sessions. He also briefly served as a vice-minister for seven months. In 1574, the ten-year-old Wanli Emperor gave Shen a present of a scroll of calligraphy he had personally written, titled Present Me to Goodness and Purify Me.

In 1578, Shen was appointed as Grand Secretary of the Jianji Hall, one of several Grand Secretaries. Shen was seen as a protégé of Zhang Juzheng, then the all-powerful First Grand Secretary and Grand Preceptor, who used heavy-handed tactics and a collaboration with the eunuch leader Feng Bao to silence critics and push through controversial reform efforts. When Zhang died in 1582, the court quickly condemned him for excessive corruption and abuse of power; after the Wanli Emperor first approved such a charge, perhaps unaware of its consequences, the court was thrown into turmoil by a flurry of impeachments of Zhang's associates, recalls of officials exiled by Zhang, and rapid reversal and condemnation of Zhang's policies. The Wanli Emperor became increasingly disturbed by what he perceived as Zhang's manipulation of himself over the course of his entire life.

Upon the death of First Grand Secretary Zhang Juzheng, he was succeeded as head of the Grand Secretariat by Zhang Siwei (張四維; Zhāng Sìwéi; Chang Ssu-wei). However, Zhang Siwei's father died within a year, which forced him to enter the traditional 27-month mourning period, during which he had to return to his ancestral home and could not serve in government. Thus, Shen Shixing was promoted to First Grand Secretary in 1583. Shen was not the oldest of the Grand Secretaries, but his personality and relatively neutral stance on Zhang Juzheng's crimes made him a good candidate for the post.

== First Grand Secretary (1583–1591) ==
As First Grand Secretary, Shen tried to mediate between the emperor and the civil service, who gradually became mired in a deep conflict over the choice of the Wanli Emperor's successor between two candidates. The Wanli Emperor's eldest son, Zhu Changluo, was preferred by the civil service, whereas the Wanli Emperor himself wished to appoint his favorite son, Zhu Changxun, born by his favorite wife, Lady Zheng. Shen was unable to resolve the succession conflict, which resulted in the Wanli Emperor's withdrawal from his governing duties and ultimately greatly stymied and disrupted the functioning of the Ming government. For this reason, Shen later felt that he had failed in his duties as First Grand Secretary. However, he could not take sole or even primary responsibility, as the problem could primarily be blamed on the meddling of overzealous, and largely younger, officials willing to martyr themselves for what they saw as a righteous cause.

Shen was generally seen as a successful First Grand Secretary, as he avoided major external conflicts, especially with the Mongols under successors of Altan Khan, and handled internal disasters adeptly, such as flooding of the Yellow River. Shen was known for being sincere and humble, and applied a "human touch" and "subtle management of personnel" to achieve his aims. Shen wished to prevent problems beforehand rather than solving them after they occurred, primarily through careful personnel management, setting a good moral example at the top of government, and consistently pursuing compromise to prevent open conflict between factions at court. This also opened him to criticism from officials who saw him as contradictory, too quick to compromise, or too prone to reversing his positions, but historian Ray Huang generally appraised Shen's handling of government positively in his 1981 book, 1587, a Year of No Significance.
