= Poems of a Thousand Masters =

Chinese classical poetry collection

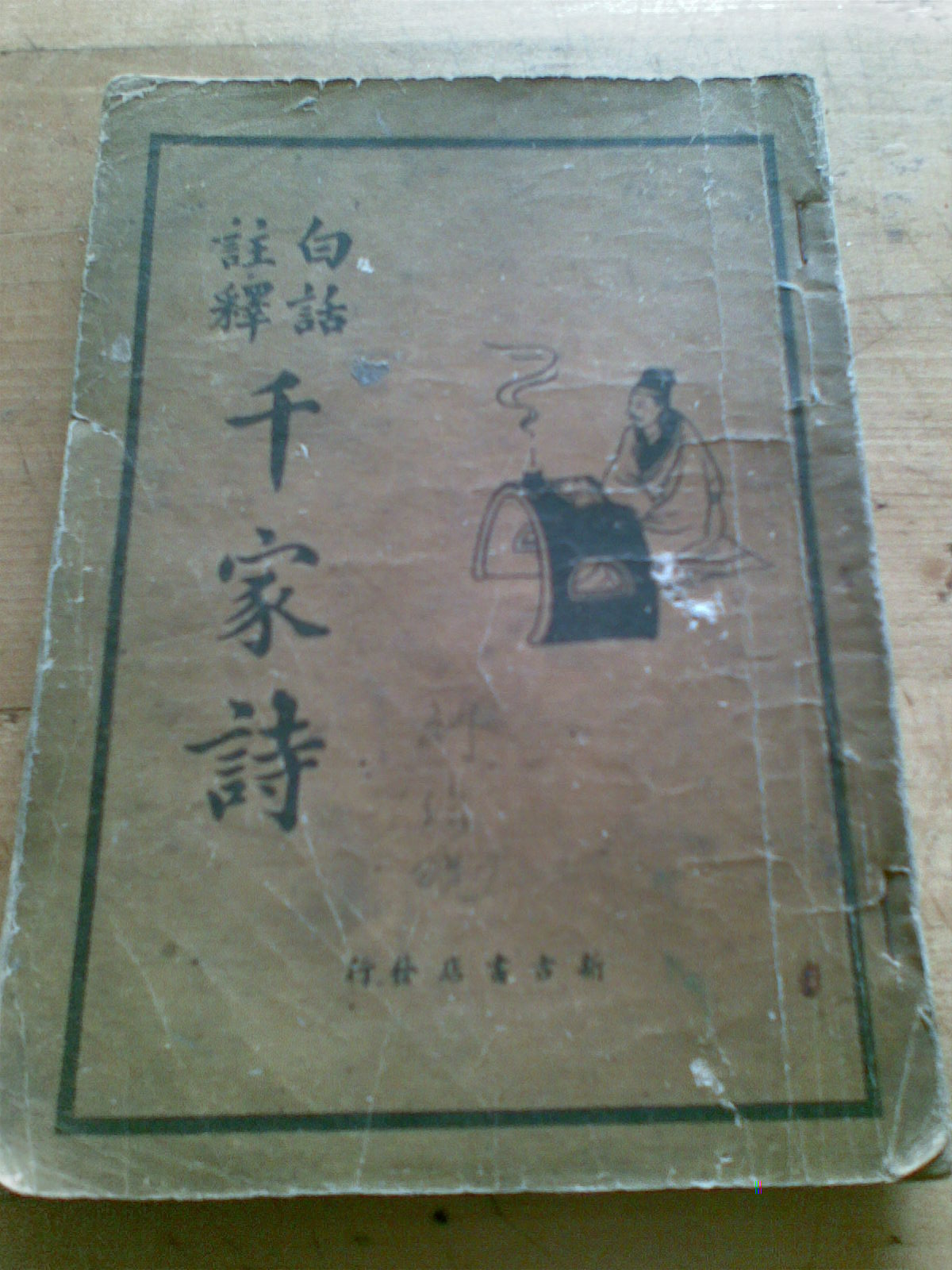
Book cover, Poems of a Thousand Masters

Title pages of Xie Fangde (1226-1289)'s edited version of Poems of a Thousand Masters

Pages from Xie Fangde's edited version of Poems of a Thousand Masters

A page from a printed edition

Poems of a Thousand Masters (千家诗; Qianjia Shi) is a 13th-century Chinese poetry anthology primarily comprising classic poems from the Tang and Song dynasties. It was originally titled "A selection of poems by a thousand distinguished poets of the Tang and Song dynasties” compiled by Liu Kezhuang (1187-1269) and subsequently condensed by Xie Fangde (1226–1289). It had been used as a children's poetry textbook throughout the late imperial eras. Ming dynasty Wang Xiang added more five-character quatrains (绝句, juéjù) and regulated verses (律诗, lǜshī) to the collection. The original edition by Liu Kezhuang consist of over 1,200 poems in 22 volumes. However, the widely circulating edition condensed by Xie Fangde and later again modified by Wang Xiang, only includes 226 poems by 126 poets, divided into 4 volumes based on poetry form. The title "a thousand masters" is more hyperbolic than descriptive. The top three Tang poets featured in the anthology are Du Fu (twenty three poems), Li Bai (nine poems), and Wang Wei (six poems).

== Editions and content ==
The original edition by Liu Kezhuang was organized by topics. In addition to common poetic themes like seasons and scenic appreciation, it also included poems portraying everyday life, aimed at acquainting younger children with the affairs, customs, habits, and common knowledge of society. This edition was relatively intricate, featuring poems of varying qualities, spread across twenty-two volumes comprising over twelve hundred pieces.

Subsequently, Xie Fangde, a descendent of the Southern Song dynasty organized and edited the collection, categorizing the poems into seven character quatrains and regulated verses. The number of poems in Xie's edition was reduced to approximately one hundred and twenty-three.

Ming dynasty Wang Xiang further organized and edited an expanded version of the anthology, adding a total of 84 five-character quatrains and verses. It begins with the famous lines by Tang dynasty poet Meng Haoran, "Spring Daybreak":

春眠不覺曉，
處處聞啼鳥。
夜來風雨聲，
花落知多少。

Drowsing in springtime, not aware of daybreak,
From all around, just hearing chiff-chaffering birds.
During the night were voices of wind and rain,
But of the blossoms’ falling, how much do we know?

— Spring Daybreak (春晓）, The Poetry of Meng Haoran translated by Paul W. Kroll

== Legacy and reception ==
Poems of a thousand masters enjoyed long-standing popularity as a beginner's textbook, as it's "easy to memorize and chant, and has circulated widely". It was top listed into the core elementary curriculum together with Three character classic (三字经, Sanzi Jing), Hundred surnames (百家姓, Baijia Xing), and Thousand character classics (千字文, Qianzi Wen), nick named "Three, Hundred, Thousand, and Thousand". During the Ming dynasty, the anthology was part of the curriculum adopted by imperial court in educating youth of the royal families, along with classic textbooks including the Analects, the Mencius, the Zhongyong, and others.

The editors of a rivaling anthology Three hundred Tang poems (唐诗三百首, Tangshi sanbaishou) criticized Poems of a Thousand Masters for its several shortcomings in selection and sorting. Firstly, they note that the poems are randomly assembled and vary in quality. Secondly, it lacks representation of certain verse forms, such as the freer ancient style (古诗, gushi), focusing primarily on regulated verse and quatrains. Lastly, poets from the Tang and Song dynasties are arranged in a disorderly manner within chapters, resulting in what they describe as a remarkably eccentric format.

== See also ==
- Complete Tang Poems
- Three Hundred Tang Poems
- Three Character Classic
- Thousand Character Classic
- Hundred Surnames
