= Gao Gong =

Chinese official (1513–1578)

- 高拱
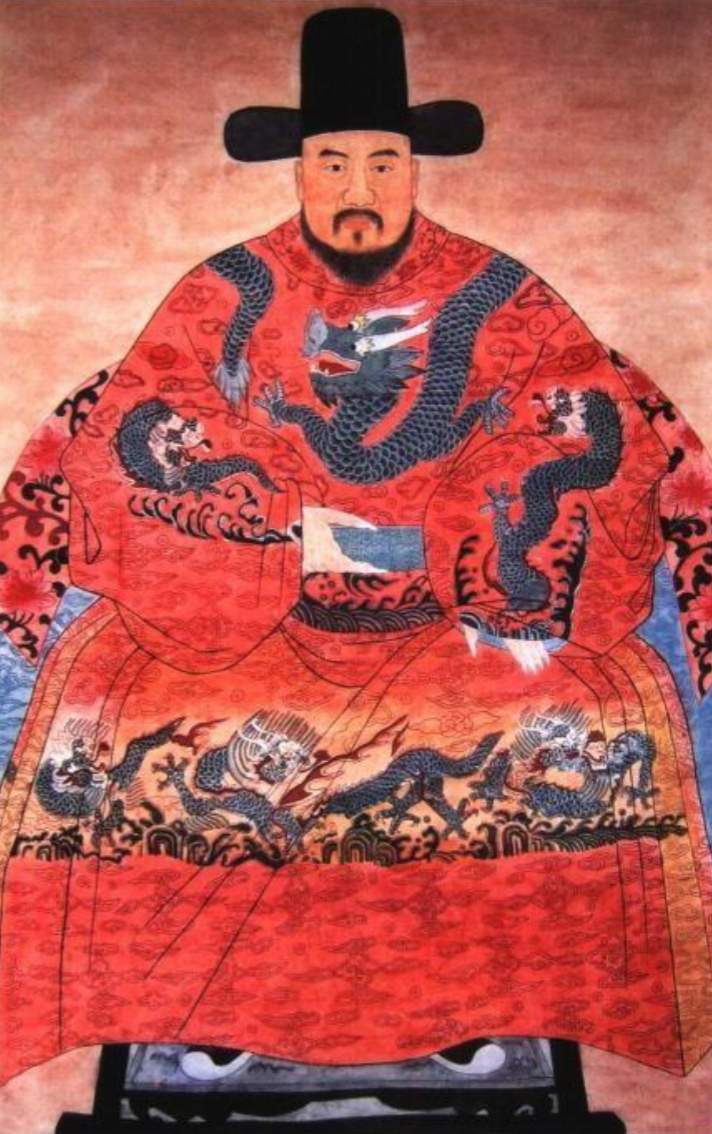

Senior Grand Secretary
- In office 1571–1572
- Monarch: Longqing
- Preceded by: Li Chunfang
- Succeeded by: Zhang Juzheng

Minister of Personnel
- In office 1570–1572
- Monarchs: Jiajing; Longqing
- Preceded by: Yang Bo
- Succeeded by: Yang Bo

Grand Secretary
- In office 1566–1567, 1570–1572
- Monarchs: Jiajing; Longqing

Personal details
- Born: 1513
- Died: 1578 (aged 64–65)
- Education: jinshi degree (1541)

Chinese name
- Chinese: 高拱
Transcriptions
Standard Mandarin
- Hanyu Pinyin: Gāo Gǒng

Gao Gong (Note: Gao Gong's courtesy name was Suqing (肅卿), and he was given the posthumous name Wenxiang (文襄).) (1513–1578) was a Chinese scholar-official during the Ming dynasty. During the reign of the Jiajing Emperor, he held a prominent position in the Emperor's inner circle. He rose to the positions of grand secretary and minister of personnel, and from 1571 to 1572 he served as head of the Grand Secretariat.

== Biography ==
Gao Gong was born in early 1513 during China's Ming dynasty in Xinzheng, Henan Province. He focused on studying Confucianism and passed the highest level of civil service examinations, known as the palace examination, with top marks in 1541. After the examinations, he was appointed to a position at the Hanlin Academy. He gradually rose through the ranks and offices. In 1552, he was chosen by the Jiajing Emperor (r. 1521–1567) to serve as a tutor to his heir, Zhu Zaiji, the future Longqing Emperor (r. 1567–1572), for nine years. Gao was highly regarded by Zhu Zaiji and was considered his most trusted and beloved teacher.

In April 1566, Gao was appointed grand secretary alongside Guo Pu with the support of Senior Grand Secretary Xu Jie. However, he soon faced accusations of disloyalty to the emperor from a censor, which he believed were instigated by Xu. This led to a rift between the two and he began to oppose Xu. Despite being a skilled politician who staunchly defended his beliefs, Gao was also known for his arrogance and bluntness. He often pushed for his own ideas without regard for precedent or rules, which made him a target for criticism from supervisory authorities. His tendency to centralize power and lack of tact weakened his political standing and hindered his ability to gain support from the bureaucracy, ultimately leading to his downfall.

In early 1567, the Jiajing Emperor died. Xu, with the assistance of Hanlin academician Zhang Juzheng drafted the Jiajing Emperor's final edict, and arranged for the accession of the Emperor's son, Zhu Zaiji. Xu refused the help of the other grand secretaries, including Gao, which further widened the rift between them. Xu and Gao, along with their respective supporters, began accusing each other of various missteps in the first half of 1567. Despite both parties being involved in the accusations, the accusations against Gao were more severe, leading to his resignation in June 1567.

The following year, Xu was forced to resign and Gao, with the assistance of his long-time ally Zhang Juzheng returned to the position of grand secretary in early 1570. This was a highly unusual move, as he also took on the role of minister of personnel. Upon his return, Gao removed his critics from their positions and, with the support of Zhang's close relationship with the imperial eunuchs, gained control over the entire administration. Together, they were able to restore state finances and strengthen regional administration by appointing capable officials. Additionally, Gao successfully negotiated peace with the Mongol Altan Khan, effectively ending decades of warfare on the northern border of the Ming dynasty. He tackled state issues on a case-by-case basis, without implementing a general reorganization of the administration. The History of Ming, the official history of the dynasty, described his governing style as "I gave Yin Chengmao one million taels of silver; he might have pocketed a half of it, but he got the job done".

In 1571, Gao ousted Senior Grand Secretary Li Chunfang, who was previously an ally of Xu, and took his position. He also fell out with Zhang. (Note: Gao Gong's agent gathered evidence of the wrongdoings of Xu Jie's family, including usury and the fraudulent seizure of small estates. Consequently, Xu's sons were facing the death penalty. However, Zhang Juzheng intervened and negotiated a lighter punishment with Gao. Gao lost trust in Zhang when rumors spread that Zhang had accepted a bribe of 30,000 liang (1,119 kg) of silver from Xu.) In July 1572, the Longqing Emperor died and was succeeded by his young son, the Wanli Emperor. The eunuch Feng Bao, head of the Directorate of Ceremonial and an enemy of Gao but close to Zhang, worked with Zhang to depose Gao. The pretext for this action was Gao Gong's alleged disrespectful remark toward the young emperor. (Note: When Gao received a message from the young emperor delivered by a eunuch, he reacted: "How can a boy of ten sui manage all the affairs under heaven?". This remark led to accusations that he was obstructing the sovereign from exercising his authority and intimidating the imperial family.) Gao was dismissed on 25 July 1572, and Zhang succeeded him as senior grand secretary on 4 August.

Gao was forced to return to his hometown and was placed under surveillance by local authorities for the rest of his life. He died in 1578.

== Notes ==
Political offices
Preceded by Li Chunfang	Senior Grand Secretary; 1571–1572	Succeeded by Zhang Juzheng
