= Ray Huang =

Chinese-American philosopher and historian (1918–2000)

- Born: June 25, 1918; Ningxiang, Hunan, Republic of China
- Died: January 8, 2000 (aged 81); New York City
- Education: Nankai University; University of Michigan
- Spouse: Gayle Bates
- Scientific career
- Fields: Macro history
- Workplaces: Columbia University; State University of New York at New Paltz; Center for East Asian Research; Cambridge University
- Doctoral advisor: Yu Ying-shih

Chinese name
- Traditional Chinese: 黃仁宇
- Simplified Chinese: 黄仁宇
Transcriptions
Standard Mandarin
- Hanyu Pinyin: Huáng Rényǔ
- Wade–Giles: Huang^{2} Jen^{2}-yü^{3}
- IPA: [xwǎŋ ɻə̌n.ỳ]

Ray Huang (Chinese: 黃仁宇; pinyin: Huáng Rényǔ; 25 June 1918 – 8 January 2000) was a Chinese-American historian and philosopher who was an officer in the National Revolutionary Army and fought in the Burma Campaign. In 1964, Huang earned a Ph.D. in history from the University of Michigan. He worked with Joseph Needham and was a contributor to Needham's Science and Civilisation in China. Huang taught history at universities in the US and the UK, and he is best known in his later years for the idea of macro-history.

== Early life ==
Ray Huang was born in Ningxiang, Hunan Province, in 1918. He was the oldest of three children. His father, Huang Zhenbai (黄震白), was an early member of the revolutionary group Tongmenghui but became less active in the group over the years. Huang grew up in Hunan and went on to study electrical engineering at Nankai University, Tianjin, in 1936. At the outbreak of the Second Sino-Japanese War in 1938, he returned to Changsha and wrote for the Anti-Japanese War Report (《抗日战报》).

Soon afterwards, Huang entered the Republic of China Military Academy (中華民國陸軍官校) at Chengdu, Sichuan, and graduated in 1940. He was appointed a Second Lieutenant Platoon Leader in 1941 and was posted as a staff First Lieutenant stationed in India in 1942. He then was a Staff Major in the New First Army in the Burma Theater from 1943 to 1945. While in Burma, he was shot through the thigh but made a complete recovery. After the war he attended the US Army Staff College, graduated in 1947, and was aide-de-camp to the head of the Chinese military delegation participating in the Allied occupation of Japan from 1949 to 1950. However, with the victory of the Communists in the Chinese Civil War and the escape from Mainland China of the Nationalist Army in 1949, the latter was purged of political opponents in 1950. Huang's superior in Japan was accused of Communist links and so Huang was discharged from the Nationalist Army in 1950, which ended his military career.

== Academic career ==
Huang went to the United States to study Chinese history. At the University of Michigan, he received his bachelor's degree in 1954, his master's degree in 1957, and his doctorate in 1964. He was appointed visiting associate professor at Columbia University in 1967, and a professor at the State University of New York, New Paltz Branch, from 1968 to 1980. He was a research fellow at the Fairbank Center for East Asian Research at Harvard in 1970.

He worked with the leading American Sinologist John K. Fairbank. Nevertheless, Huang and Fairbank disagreed in research methodology. Fairbank liked concentrated analysis in short time frames and limited areas, but Huang liked synthesis covering broad time periods (though Huang's classic work 1587, a Year of No Significance had a very tight focus).

In 1972, Huang went to Cambridge University and assisted Joseph Needham, who was more sympathetic to Huang's research approach, in Needham's monumental work on the history of Chinese science and technology. Huang's chosen field of study became financial administration in Ming China, and he published one of his major works, Taxation and Finance in Sixteenth Century Ming China, in 1974 (translated into Chinese only in 2001).

Huang returned to Cambridge in the mid-1970s and contributed two chapters to the Ming Dynasty Volumes of The Cambridge History of China. Around the late 1970s, he retired from teaching and focused on writing instead and even occasionally contributed to a column in Yazhou Zhoukan. Nonetheless, he often travelled to Taiwan even after his retirement to give lectures and participate in various academic exchanges.

His other works include The War in Northern Burma (1946), 1587, a Year of No Significance (1981) (also published in Chinese as The Fifteenth Year of Wan Li/《萬曆十五年》, 1985), Broadening the Chinese Field of Vision (in Chinese, 1988), Chinese Macrohistory (1988) (in Chinese 1993), Conversations about Chinese History on the Banks of the Hudson River (in Chinese 1989), Discussions of Here and There and Old and New (in Chinese 1991), Capitalism and the Twenty First Century (in Chinese 1991), From a Macrohistory Perspective in Reading Jiang Jieshi's Diary (in Chinese 1993), Contemporary Chinese Outlets (in Chinese 1994), The Affair of Wan Chong (in Chinese 1998), Yellow River Blue Mountain: Record of Huang Renzi's Recollections (in Chinese 2001), and Bianjing Unfinished Dreams.

== Personal life ==
Huang married Gayle Bates (1937–2000) in 1966. The two had a son, Jefferson, a longtime administrator at Claremont McKenna College, as well as two other sons from his wife's previous marriage. Huang died of a heart attack in 2000.

== Books ==
- 1587, a Year of No Significance. First published in English (Yale University Press, 1981), with Chinese (Wanli Shiwunian) and other language translations.
- China: A Macro History
- Fiscal Administration during the Ming Dynasty
- Conversation on Chinese History by the Hudson River (in Chinese)
- Broadening the Horizons of Chinese History: Discourses, Syntheses, and Comparisons
- Capitalism and the 21st Century(in Chinese)
- The Grand Canal during the Ming Dynasty, 1368-1644 (Doctoral dissertation)
- White Jasmine of Changsha (Novel)
- Taxation and Governmental Finance in Sixteenth-Century Ming China
