= Liu Kezhuang =

Liu Kezhuang (simplified Chinese: 刘克庄; traditional Chinese: 劉克莊; pinyin: Liú Kèzhuāng; Wade–Giles: Liu K'o-chuang, 1187–1269), was a Song Dynasty Chinese poet and literary critic.

He is credited with selecting the first version of the anthology "Poems by a Thousand Masters" (zh:千家詩 sometimes also known as "Poems of the Masters"). In later versions of the anthology, two of his poems are included.

Liu is considered the most important member of the "Rivers and Lakes (江湖詩派 jiānghú shīpăi)" group of poets. This group of poets favoured subjects from everyday life and rejected the refined language and courtly themes of the Kangxi school.

Several thousand of his shī poems (詩) survive, and very many of his cí poems (詞) survive as well.

During his life, Liu occupied several low-level posts in the administration; it appears that his use of poetry for social criticism got in the way of his advancement.
