= Zhang Juzheng =

Chinese official (1525–1582)

- 張居正
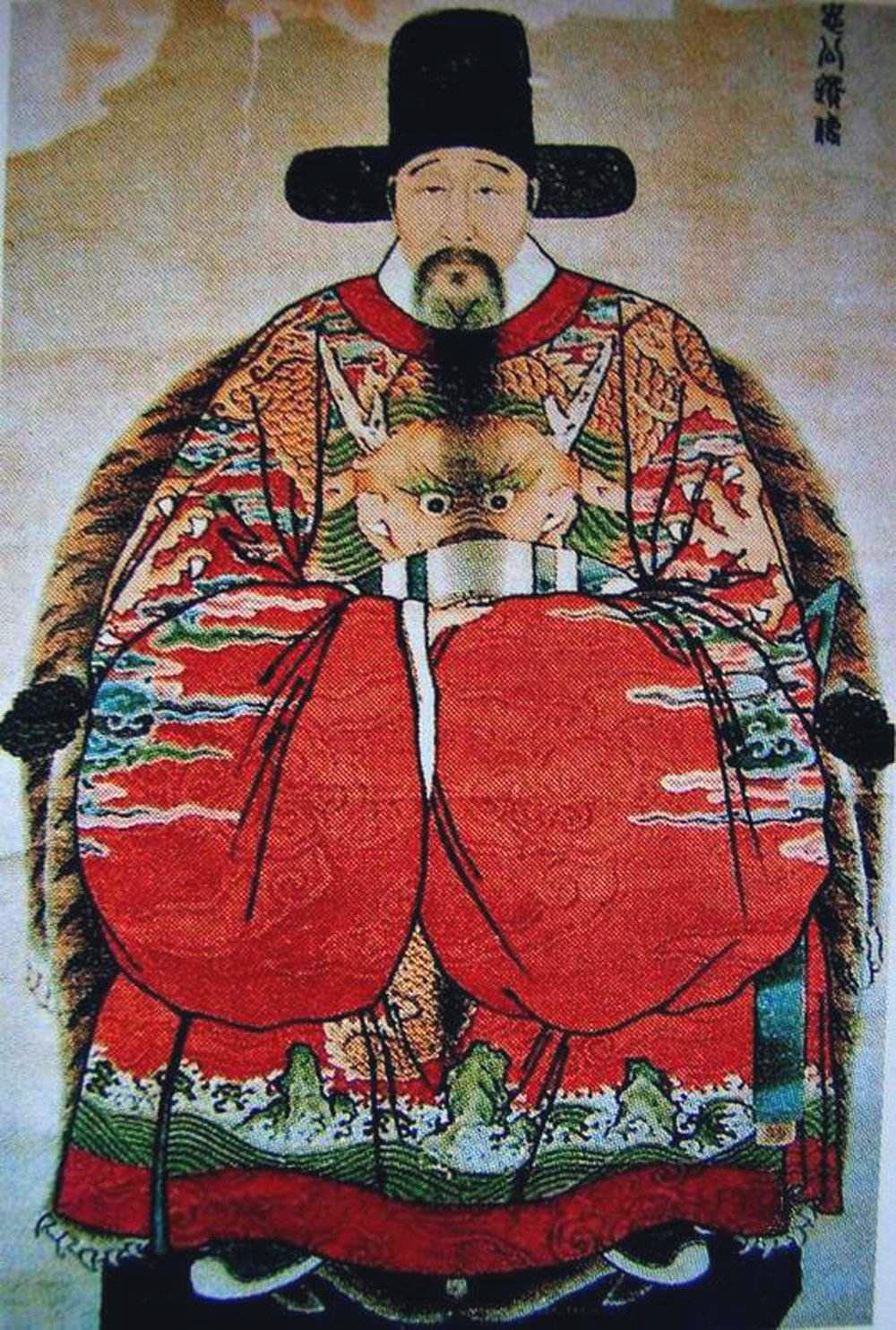

Senior Grand Secretary
- In office 1572–1582
- Monarchs: Longqing; Wanli
- Preceded by: Gao Gong
- Succeeded by: Zhang Siwei

Grand Secretary
- In office 1567–1582
- Monarchs: Longqing; Wanli

Personal details
- Born: 26 May 1525 Jiangling, Hubei
- Died: 9 July 1582 (aged 57) Beijing
- Education: juren degree in the provincial examination held by Huguang province (1540) jinshi degree (1547)

Chinese name
- Traditional Chinese: 張居正
- Simplified Chinese: 张居正
Transcriptions
Standard Mandarin
- Hanyu Pinyin: Zhāng Jūzhèng
- Wade–Giles: Chang^{1} Chü^{1}–cheng^{4}
- IPA: [ʈʂáŋ tɕýʈʂə̂ŋ]

Zhang Juzheng (Note: Zhang Juzheng used the courtesy name Shuda (叔大) and the art name Taiyue (太岳). He was also known as Zhang Jiangling (張江陵) and was given the posthumous name Wenzhong (文忠; 'Cultured and Loyal').) (26 May 1525 – 9 July 1582) was a Chinese scholar-official of the Ming dynasty who served as grand secretary during the reigns of the Longqing and Wanli emperors. In 1547, he passed the highest level of official examinations and was granted the rank of jinshi. He then served at the Hanlin Academy. In 1567, the Longqing Emperor appointed him as grand secretary, and upon the ascension of the Wanli Emperor in 1572, he became the head of the grand secretaries.

During the early years of the Wanli Emperor's reign, Zhang was the de facto ruler of China and played a key role in centralizing the administration, limiting various privileges, and revising land tax exemptions. His decisive foreign and economic policies contributed to one of the most successful periods in Ming history. After his death in 1582, many of these reforms were reversed, and in 1584 his family was stripped of its accumulated property and wealth. He was not rehabilitated until more than half a century later, shortly before the fall of the Ming dynasty.

== Youth and early career ==
Zhang Juzheng was born in 1525 during China's Ming dynasty in Jiangling, Huguang (present-day Jiangling, Hubei). He studied Confucianism and successfully passed the provincial examination in 1540, but he failed the metropolitan examination in 1544. Three years later, at an unusually young age, he passed the metropolitan examination and also passed the palace examination, receiving the rank of jinshi. He then joined the Hanlin Academy. In 1554, he resigned due to illness. After six years, he returned to service, this time at the Guozijian (or Imperial University), and later at the Hanlin Academy. He never held office outside of Beijing.

After the death of the Jiajing Emperor (r. 1521–1567), Zhang, then a Hanlin academic, was enlisted by Senior Grand Secretary Xu Jie to draft the late emperor's final edict. Xu had supported Zhang's career since the late 1540s. The edict was issued the day after the late emperor's death and proclaimed the accession of his son, the Longqing Emperor, to the throne. Soon after, Zhang was promoted to grand secretary. During the Longqing Emperor's reign, Zhang's influence continued to grow. In 1572, shortly after the Longqing Emperor's death and the accession of his son, the Wanli Emperor, to the throne, the eunuch Feng Bao, head of the Directorate of Ceremonial (司禮監太監; Silijian taijian), worked with Zhang to depose the then senior grand secretary, Gao Gong. The pretext for this was Gao Gong's disrespectful remark to the Emperor. Zhang Juzheng became the head of the Grand Secretariat.

== Senior Grand Secretary ==
Zhang held onto his position of power for a decade until his death in 1582, during which he served as the Wanli Emperor's mentor and de facto ruler of China due to the Emperor's immaturity. During his time in office, he relied heavily on the support of eunuchs, particularly Feng Bao, and the Emperor's mother, Empress Dowager Li, who acted as regent. This allowed him to personally select his colleagues in the Grand Secretariat; (Note: In the years 1572–1582, in addition to Zhang Juzheng, Lü Diaoyang (呂調陽; 1572–1578), Zhang Siwei (張四維; 1575–1583), Ma Ziqiang (馬自強; 1578), and Shen Shixing (1578–1591) worked in the Grand Secretariat.) he also exerted informal control over the Ministry of Rites and the Censorate, appointing his followers to important positions in both central offices and regional areas. These individuals were typically ambitious and driven. Through these tactics, Zhang gained significant influence in the government, despite lacking the authority to give orders or make demands due to his position. Instead, he could only issue orders or instructions in the name of the Emperor or informally.

Zhang sought to consolidate the power of the central government and elevate the role of the Emperor by streamlining the administration and bolstering the military, often at the expense of local interests. He wielded his influence in the Censorate to enforce stricter discipline within the bureaucracy, redirecting their focus from internal conflicts to tasks such as tax collection and suppression of bandits. To assess the effectiveness of the administration, monthly and semi-annual reports were compiled for each county and prefecture, measuring their success in these areas. This led to a period of peak efficiency in the Ming state administration from 1572 to 1582, a level typically only seen in the early years of the empire.

=== Ideological disputes ===
In contrast to the focus on internal self-improvement advocated by the followers of Wang Yangming's teachings, Zhang presented an alternative program based on pragmatic pursuit of the state's interests. He believed that actions aimed at the good of the state and its people were the correct course of action. His motto was "If it is to the benefit of the state, I would do it regardless of life or death".

Zhang presented his reforms as a return to the state at the beginning of the dynasty, positioning himself advantageously by citing the laws and decrees of the Ming dynasty's founder, the Hongwu Emperor, as an unassailable source of law. In general, Zhang advocated for the idea that more recent emperors and governments, particularly the Hongwu Emperor, should be seen as political models rather than the wise rulers of antiquity. He even brought up this topic at the metropolitan examinations of 1571, where he served as the chief examiner. Zhang justified his actions against intellectuals who were preoccupied with debates about morality and introspection by claiming that he was defending the interests of the empire rather than seeking personal gain. He viewed these individuals not as moral role models, but as irresponsible slackers, and thus attempted to suppress government-uncontrolled discussion gatherings of opposition-minded educated people. Wang Yangming's followers responded with resistance, seizing every opportunity to criticize Zhang's rule.

Zhang's actions, while within the bounds of existing legislation, were seen by his critics as an abuse of power to promote his followers and exert illegitimate pressure on officials. Open criticism of Zhang was rare until his father's death in 1577. According to the law, Zhang was supposed to leave his office to mourn, and it was proposed that Xu Jie, who retired in 1568, be recalled to take charge of the Grand Secretariat. Zhang requested to be relieved of his duties, but the fourteen-year-old emperor decided that he could not do without him and canceled his mourning. The official reason given for Zhang's indispensability was the Emperor's upcoming wedding, but Zhang's supporters, and perhaps Zhang himself, feared that his prolonged absence would weaken their political positions. Although the Emperor repeatedly rejected Zhang's resignations, there was a general consensus that if Zhang truly wanted to leave, he would be able to convince the Emperor to agree. While it was not unprecedented for officials to stay in office during mourning, there was widespread criticism for disrespecting parents. This criticism was based on the belief that a person who is not a faithful son cannot be a faithful subject, and someone who cannot properly rule themselves cannot rule others. The Emperor punished the most vocal critics with beatings, but Zhang's prestige was shaken. In an effort to suppress the opposition, Zhang enforced an extraordinary self-evaluation of all high-ranking officials, which allowed him to eliminate around fifty opponents.

=== State finances ===
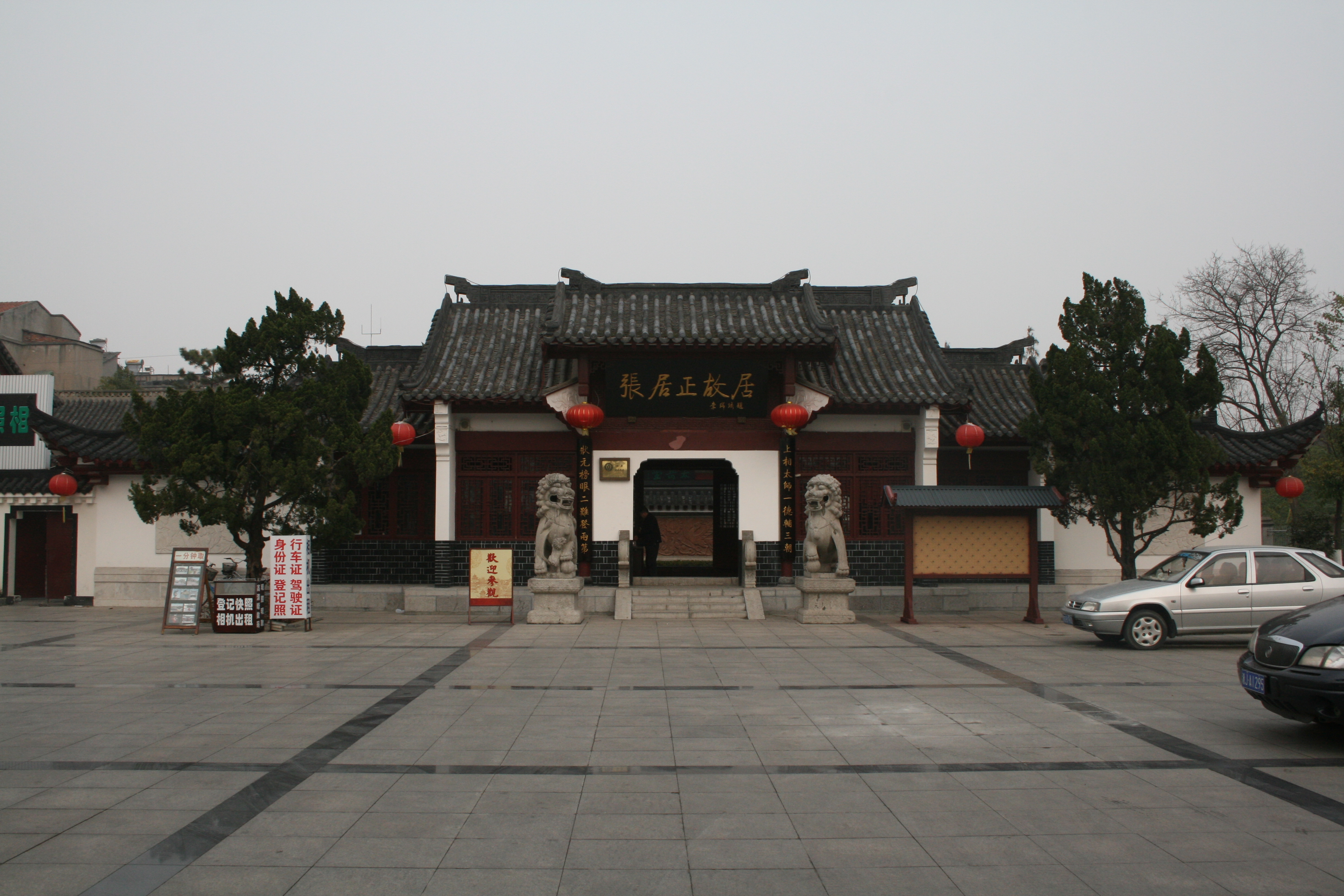
Zhang's former residence in Jingzhou

When the Wanli Emperor ascended to the throne, state finances were in disarray. The traditional system of natural taxes and mandatory labor at the county level was being replaced by silver payments and additional fees, known as the single whip reform. In order to address this issue, Zhang conducted an audit of the accounts and implemented cost-saving measures. One such measure was converting the obligation of supplying horses to the army into a silver tax. Additionally, from 1572 to 1579, the accounts of county offices regarding labor and various fees were revised. With the publication of the revised lists of obligations, now converted into a unified silver payment, the single whip reform was officially implemented throughout the empire. As part of administrative reforms, insignificant activities were abolished or limited, the number of Confucian students receiving state support was reduced, and provincial authorities were urged to only require one-third of the previous labor demands. Accommodation services at postal offices were also limited to a minimum. Despite these changes, taxes remained at their original levels and tax arrears were strictly enforced. Zhang was able to accumulate a surplus of income over expenses. This was a significant achievement, as the Ming state typically operated with little to no reserves in the 16th century. Under Zhang's administration, significant sums were saved through improved tax collection and savings. This surplus was evident in the nine years' worth of grain stored in granaries around the capital, 6 million liang (approximately 223 tons) of silver in the treasury of the Ministry of Revenue, 4 million liang in the Court of the Imperial Stud, and an additional 2.5 million liang in Nanjing. Smaller reserves were also available to provincial administrations in Sichuan, Zhejiang, and Guangxi. Despite these achievements, there were no institutional changes made under Zhang Juzheng's leadership. His approach was to streamline existing processes and return to the order of the early empire.

In an effort to bring order to the collection of land tax in 1581, Zhang enforced the creation of a new cadastre (land survey). This was the first nationwide survey of fields since the Song period. Over the course of 1581–1582, the fields were measured, their borders were marked, their size was calculated, and the owners and tenants were recorded. Cadastral maps were also compiled during this time. Due to Zhang's early death and the rescission of his policies, a final cadastre for the entire country was not completed. However, at the local level, the work served its purpose by unifying units of measurement and increasing the area of registered fields by including previously unregistered areas. Zhang's cadastre served as the foundation for later Ming and Qing cadastres and was only surpassed in completeness and detail by modern cadastres.

=== Currency ===
Zhang aimed to increase the welfare of the people by expanding the currency supply. However, he was concerned about the potential negative impact of fluctuations in imports on the economy, and therefore deemed silver to be an insufficient medium of currency. To address this issue, he established mints in Beijing, Nanjing, and eventually Yunnan in 1576. In the major cities, high-quality coins with a copper content of 93.8% were produced, while in the provinces, the coins had a slightly lower copper content but a higher weight. Additionally, Zhang attempted to gain control of the currency from money changers by producing his own coins. Mints were opened in both northern provinces where coins were commonly used, such as Shanxi, Shandong, and Henan, as well as in provinces where they were not as commonly used, such as Shaanxi, Jiangxi, Fujian, and Huguang. However, the provincial mints were managed by entrepreneurs chosen by regional authorities, resulting in the production of coins of poor quality.

The production of coins faced immediate challenges, including a shortage of copper for casting and difficulties in hiring qualified personnel. The mint in Jiangxi was only able to produce 5% of the planned number of coins. Local authorities mandated that at least 70% of tax payments must be made in new coins and organized the importation of coins from neighboring provinces through traders. However, these coins were often of low quality and were privately (and illegally) produced. Additionally, there was a lack of money changers in Jiangxi, making it difficult for people to obtain the new coins. A similar situation existed in Fujian, where silver was already widely used as a form of currency. The monetary policy of the Zhang government was disjointed, with officials in each province making decisions based on their own judgment. For example, in Zhejiang, officials attempted to increase the use of coins by converting soldiers' salaries into coins, which ultimately led to a rebellion in Hangzhou in 1582. In Jiangxi, private exchange offices were banned, which hindered the circulation of new coins. In some provinces, the export of coins was prohibited, while in others, only coins minted within the province were allowed to circulate, often for the benefit of corrupt officials involved in private coin production. Official attempts to introduce new coins into circulation by selling them at a discount only benefited money changers, who bought the coins cheaply from the government and sold them at the regular market price. Attempts by some officials to ban the use of illegal private coins resulted in violent protests and the lifting of the bans. Despite officials' efforts to promote the use of new coins, they were unable to produce enough of them and distribute them effectively outside of provincial capitals. Within a few years, the population reverted to using silver and grain as the primary forms of currency.

During the years 1577–1581, the price of state coinage rose by approximately 70% due to a shortage of copper. This resulted in an increase in the cost of coinage from 0.9 to 0.98 liang (37.3 grams) of silver per 1,000 coins (officially costing just 1 liang) to 1.35 liang. In 1579, Zhang acknowledged the failure of the attempt to introduce coins. Although coins minted in Beijing were accepted by the market, private coins of poor quality continued to dominate in the south. This was partly due to the state's inability to circulate high-quality coins from Beijing, as a significant portion remained in the treasuries of the Ministry of Revenue and the Emperor. In 1580, the Yunnan mint was closed, and after Zhang's death in 1582, his successors and opponents abolished most of the other provincial mints due to inefficiency. Three mints in Huguang continued to operate, producing different coins and leading to the division of the province into several currency zones.

Zhang's opponents argued that the state should not interfere in market and currency affairs, and should not impose a currency that the people did not want. On the other hand, supporters of state coinage argued that while silver may serve as a store of value, coins are essential as a medium of exchange. They believed that even if the production of coins resulted in losses, it would ultimately lead to economic recovery and profit in the long run.

=== Military ===
Zhang, influenced by the Mongol raids of the 1550s, aimed to "enrich the country and strengthen the army" through legalistic methods rather than Confucian principles. To achieve this, he not only rejected the notion that military affairs were less important than civilian ones, but also challenged the dominance of civilian dignitaries over military leaders. He strategically placed capable military leaders, such as Qi Jiguang, Wang Chonggu (王崇古), Tan Lun, Liang Menglong (梁夢龍), and Li Chengliang, in positions of responsibility. Additionally, he implemented a combination of defensive and offensive measures to strengthen border defenses and opened up border markets, particularly in the northwest. The morale of the Ming troops reached a level not seen since the mid-15th century. As a proponent of peace with the Mongols, Zhang rejected Tan Lun's proposal for a pre-emptive attack and instead instructed the commander of the northern border, Qi Jiguang, to maintain an armed peace. This decision ultimately led to a reduction in the northern border army and the return of surplus soldiers to their family farms.

The Wanli Emperor's more aggressive military policy was based on Zhang's successes. After Zhang's death, his supporters were removed from office, but the Emperor protected the officers. They then adopted a more aggressive stance in relations with the Mongols overall. On the northern border, the Wanli Emperor tried to replace static defense with a more offensive strategy.

== Death and legacy ==
Zhang died on 9 July 1582. Following his death, he was accused of the common transgressions of high-ranking officials, including bribery, indulgent living, favoring unqualified supporters, abuse of authority, and suppressing dissent. Shortly after, his supporters among the officials were removed from their positions, and in early 1583, his former ally Feng Bao was relocated to a lower-ranking position in Nanjing, where he eventually died.

Zhang enforced a life of modesty upon the Emperor, who was deeply affected by Zhang's life of luxury. Zhang's entire family paid the price for his double morality, which angered the Emperor and caused him to look suspiciously at all officials. In April 1584, Zhang was accused by the concubine of Zhu Xianjie (朱憲㸅; d. 1582), a member of the imperial family and prince of Liao, of embezzling the prince's property. The Emperor responded by confiscating Zhang's family property and Zhang himself was posthumously stripped of all titles and ranks. Zhang's eldest son, Zhang Jingxiu (張敬修), and his wife, as well as his fourth son, committed suicide, while ten of Zhang's descendants were imprisoned in an empty house and died of starvation. The confiscation did not yield as much as the Emperor had expected. In Beijing and Jingzhou, properties and houses were seized, but only a relatively small amount of gold and silver was discovered. In Beijing, 2,400 liang (89.5 kg) of gold and 107,700 liang (4 tons) of silver were found, while in Jingzhou, 200,000 liang (7.5 tons) of silver and 110 boxes of valuables were seized. No art objects, such as paintings or calligraphy, were found, despite Zhang's renowned collection. This can be attributed to Zhang's close relationship with the commanders of the Embroidered Uniform Guard, specifically Liu Shouyou and Shi Jishu. These commanders owed their careers to Zhang, and in return, in 1584, they assisted the family in hiding a portion of their property. A significant amount of the confiscated property ended up in their own collections. (Note: The disappearance of the Zhang collections was a remarkable event, and it immediately led the authorities to accuse Liu Shouyou and his colleagues. This was a serious crime that carried the punishment of death. Liu's friends and political allies, including the Emperor's younger brother Zhu Yiliu, Grand Secretary Shen Shixing, and several other officials, stood by his side and convinced the Emperor that Liu was innocent and the accusations were false. The Emperor hesitated and continued to promote Liu, but after a new wave of lawsuits, he eventually retired Liu in 1588. Liu then lived peacefully in his hometown until his death.)

Zhang's reforms were only partially successful. While he did support General Qi Jiguang in implementing new recruitment, training, and tactics, he was unable to extend these changes to other Ming armies. Additionally, he was able to accumulate a significant amount of financial reserves, but was unable to effectively utilize them. Although he gained control over the state administration, his control was based on personal relationships and authority rather than being institutionalized. Despite agreeing to Zhang's posthumous condemnation, the Wanli Emperor adopted many of his political views. These included a distrust of local authorities and opposition to factional politics within bureaucratic cliques. Both Zhang and the Emperor shared an interest in military affairs and the importance of capable military leaders.

In 1622, the Tianqi Emperor rehabilitated Zhang Juzheng.

== Notes ==
Political offices
Preceded by Gao Gong	Senior Grand Secretary; 1572–1582	Succeeded by Zhang Siwei
