= Guo (disambiguation) =

Guo or GUO may refer to:

== People ==
- Guo (郭), a Chinese surname
- Guo (surname 國), Chinese surname
- Consort Guo (disambiguation)
- Empress Guo (disambiguation)
- Prince Guo

== Places ==
- Guo Prefecture (disambiguation)
- Eastern Guo, an ancient Chinese state
- Western Guo, an ancient Chinese state, divided into Northern Guo and Southern Guo

== Other uses ==
- Guayabero language, a Guahiban language of Colombia
- Gualaco Airport, in Honduras
- Main Guard Directorate (Russian: Glavnoye upravleniye okhraneniya), a branch of the Soviet Union's KGB
