= Consort Guo =

Consort Guo may refer to:

- Guo Shengtong (6–52), wife of Emperor Guangwu of Han
- Guo Nüwang (184–235), wife of Emperor Wen of Cao Wei
- Empress Guo (Cao Rui's wife) (died 264), wife of Emperor Ming of Cao Wei
- Consort Guo (Jingzong) (fl. 820s), concubine of Emperor Jingzong of Tang
- Empress Dowager Guo (Tang dynasty) (died 848), wife of Emperor Xianzong of Tang
- Consort Guo (Yizong) (disappeared 880), concubine of Emperor Yizong of Tang
- Empress Guo (Zhenzong) (975–1007), wife of Emperor Zhenzong of Song
- Empress Guo (Renzong) (1012–1035), wife of Emperor Renzong of Song
- Guo Ai (died 1435), concubine of the Xuande Emperor
- Empress Xiaoyuanzhen (1580–1613), wife of the Taichang Emperor

== See also ==
- Lady Guo (disambiguation)
