= Empress Dowager Guo =

Empress Dowager Guo may refer to:

- Guo Nüwang (184–235), Cao Pi's wife and empress dowager during the Cao Wei. She is best known for killing the innocent Lady Zhen and treating her dead body badly.
- Empress Guo (Cao Rui's wife) (died 263), An intelligent girl, who fought hard to prevent her empire from falling. Was the true final Wei character to die and is the final heroine of Wei.
- Empress Dowager Guo (Tang dynasty) (died 848), consort and empress dowager during the Tang dynasty

== See also ==
- Empress Guo (disambiguation)
