= Empress Dowager Xiaochun =

Chinese empress dowager (1588–1615)

Empress Dowager Xiaochun 孝純太后
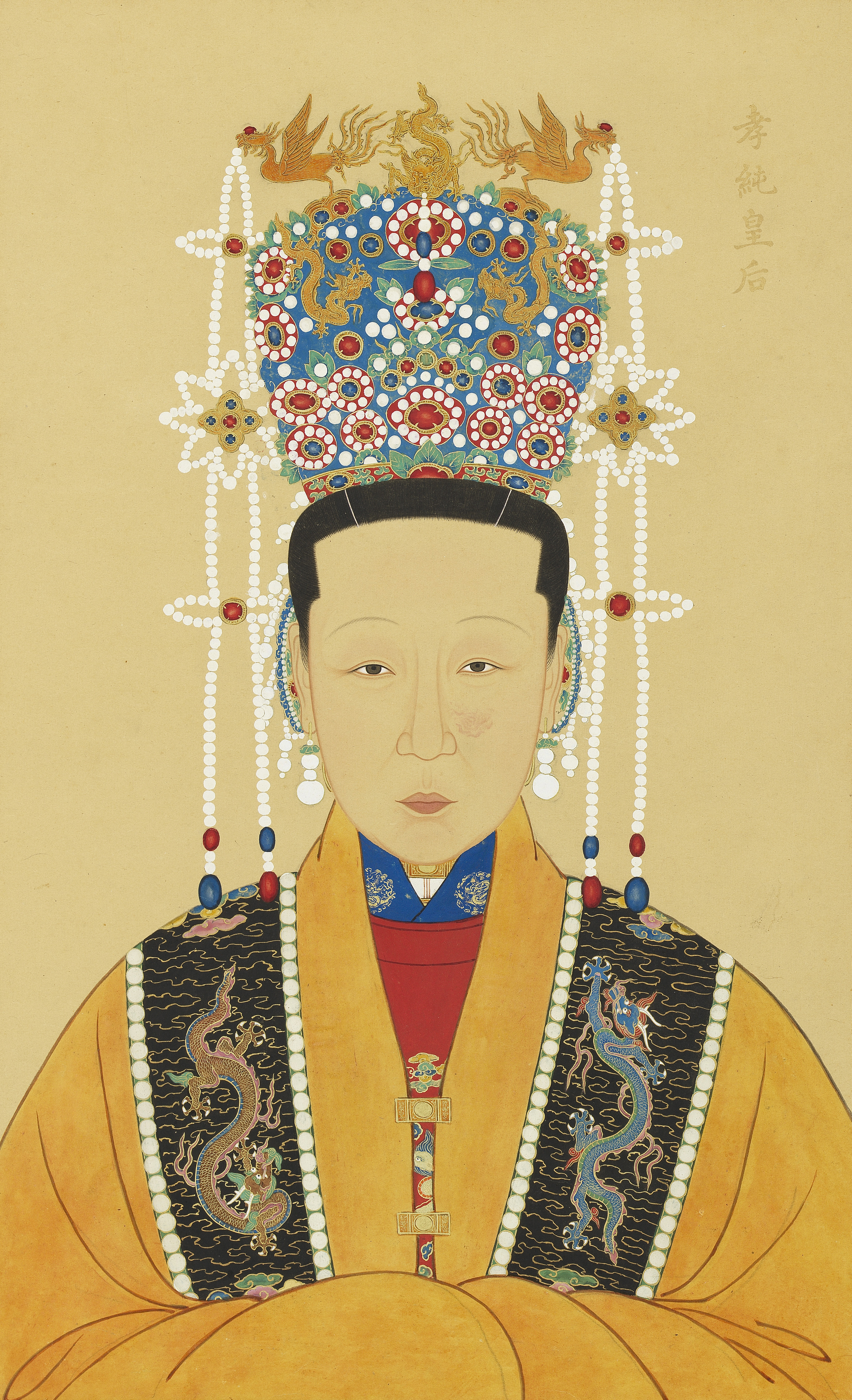
- Born: 1588; Hai Prefecture
- Died: 1615 (aged 26–27); Forbidden City, Beijing
- Burial: Qing Mausoleum
- Spouse: Taichang Emperor
- Issue: Chongzhen Emperor
Posthumous name
- Empress Dowager Xiàochún Gōngyì Shūmù Zhuāngjìng Pítiān Yùshèng (孝純恭懿淑穆莊靜毘天毓聖皇太后)
- Clan: Liu (劉)
- Father: Liu Yingyuan (劉應元)
- Mother: Lady Xu (徐氏)

Empress Dowager Xiaochun (1588–1615), surnamed Liu, was a Ming dynasty concubine of the Taichang Emperor and biological mother of the Chongzhen Emperor.

== Biography ==
Liu became a concubine of the Taichang Emperor Zhu Changluo when he was the crown prince. She was of the rank lady (Chinese: 淑女; pinyin: shūnǚ), a low-level concubine.

In February 1611, Lady Liu gave birth to Zhu Youjian. In 1614, her husband became infuriated with her for an unknown reason and ordered that she be punished, at which point Lady Liu was killed. It is debated whether the crown prince ordered Lady Liu's death, or it occurred accidentally during her punishment.

== Legacy ==
Fearing reproachment for Lady Liu's death from his father, as well as the spirits and ancestors, the crown prince forbade the palace staff from mentioning the affair and had Lady Liu buried in the Western Hills near Beijing.

On the succession of the Tianqi Emperor in 1620, Zhu Youjian was given the title Prince of Xin (信王) and Lady Liu was posthumously awarded the title Consort Xian (Chinese: 賢妃). During this time, Zhu Youjian uncovered the location of his mother's resting place from his attendants.

When Zhu Youjian succeeded to the imperial throne as the Chongzhen Emperor in 1627, he granted his mother the posthumous title of Empress Dowager Xiaochun Gongyi Shumu Zhuangjing Pitian Yusheng. The Chongzhen Emperor also moved her tomb to Qingling to be buried alongside her husband.

== Titles ==
- During the reign of the Wanli Emperor (r. 1572–1620):
  - Lady Liu (劉氏; from 1588)
  - Lady of Gentleness (淑女)
- During the reign of the Tianqi Emperor (r.1620–1627):
  - Consort Xian (賢妃; from 1621)
- During the reign of the Chongzhen Emperor (r. 1627–1644):
  - Empress Dowager Xiàochún Gōngyì Shūmù Zhuāngjìng Pítiān Yùshèng (孝純恭懿淑穆莊靜毘天毓聖皇太后; from 1627)

== Issue ==
- As Lady of Gentleness:
  - Zhu Youjian, the Chongzhen Emperor (崇禎帝 朱由檢; 6 February 1611 – 25 April 1644), the Taichang Emperor's fifth son
