= Lady Guo =

Lady Guo may refer to women in imperial China with the surname Guo, including:

- Guo Huai (wife of Jia Chong) (237–296)
- Lady Guo (wife of Wang Yan) (died 300), Guo Huai's niece
- Princess Dowager Guo (fl. 363), Zhang Chonghua's concubine

== See also ==
- Empress Guo (disambiguation)
- Consort Guo (disambiguation)
