= Guozhou =

Guozhou may refer to:

- Guó Prefecture (虢州), a prefecture between the 6th and 13th centuries in modern Henan, China
- Guǒ Prefecture (果州), a prefecture between the 7th and 13th centuries in modern Sichuan, China
- Later Zhou (951–960), a dynasty sometimes known as Guo Zhou (郭周).

== See also ==
- Ninepin Group, a group of islands in Hong Kong, also known as Guozhou Islands (果洲群島)
- Guo (disambiguation)
