= Ming tombs =

Collection of mausoleums built by emperors of China

Imperial Tombs of the Ming and Qing Dynasties
UNESCO World Heritage Site
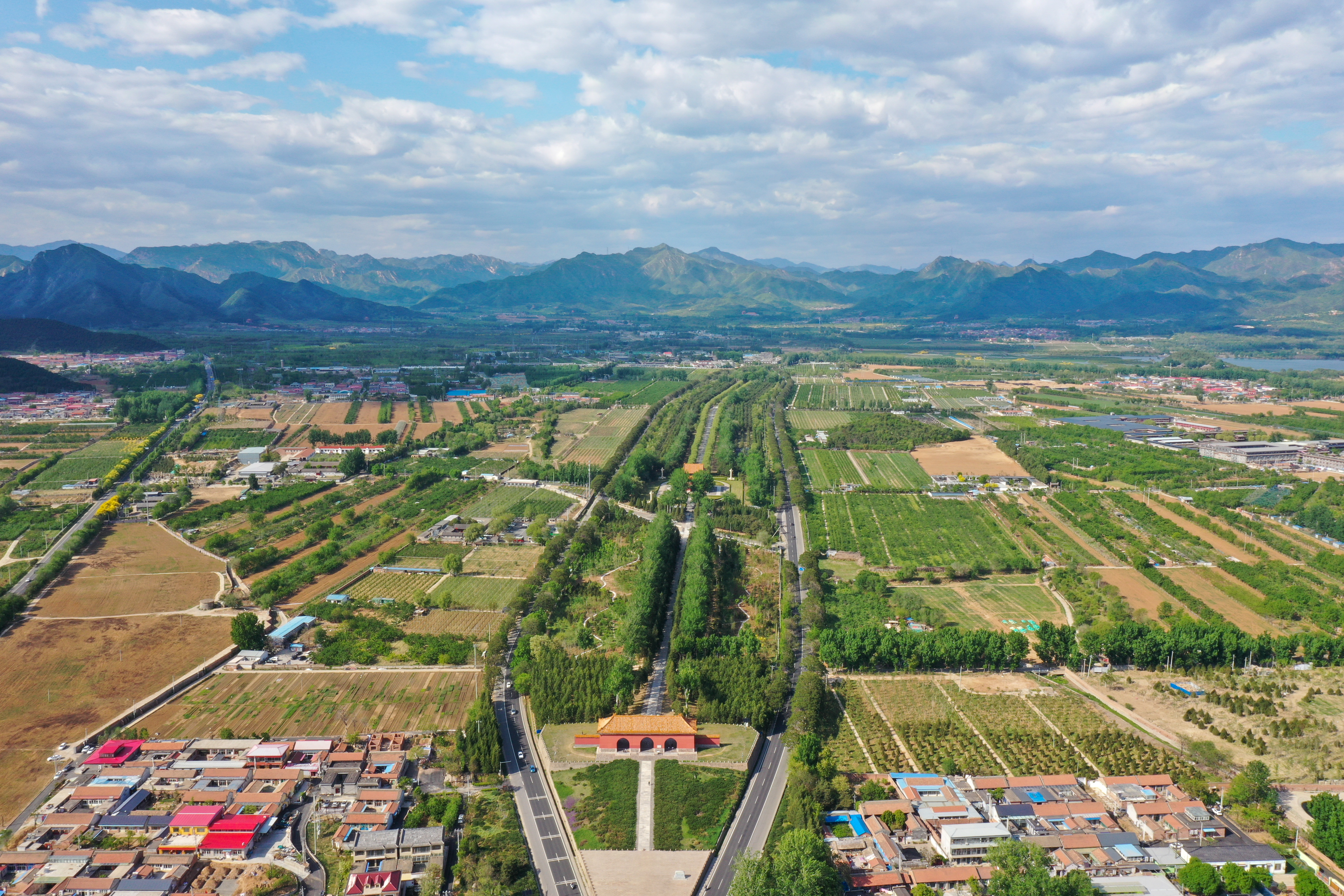
- Dagong gate (Red in the middle) and Spirit way of the Ming tombs (behind the gate).
- Interactive map of Imperial Tombs of the Ming and Qing Dynasties
- Location: Beijing and Nanjing, China
- Criteria: Cultural: i, ii, iii, iv, vi
- Reference: 1004
- Inscription: 2000 (24th Session)
- Extensions: 2003; 2004
- Website: http://www.mingtombs.com/
- Coordinates: 40°15′12″N 116°13′3″E

The Ming tombs are a collection of mausoleums built by the emperors of the Ming dynasty of China. The tomb of the first Ming ruler, the Hongwu Emperor (r. 1368–1398), is located near his capital Nanjing. However, the majority of the Ming tombs are located in a cluster near Beijing and collectively known as the Thirteen Tombs of the Ming dynasty (Chinese: 明十三陵; pinyin: Míng Shísān Líng; lit. 'Ming Thirteen Mausoleums'). They are located within the suburban Changping District of Beijing Municipality, 42 kilometers (26 mi) north-northwest of Beijing's city center. The site, on the southern slope of Tianshou Mountain (originally Huangtu Mountain), was chosen based on the principles of feng shui by the third Ming emperor, the Yongle Emperor (r. 1402–1424). Before the completion of the Imperial Palace (Forbidden City) in 1420, the Yongle Emperor selected his burial site and created his own mausoleum. Most of the subsequent emperors placed their tombs in the same valley.

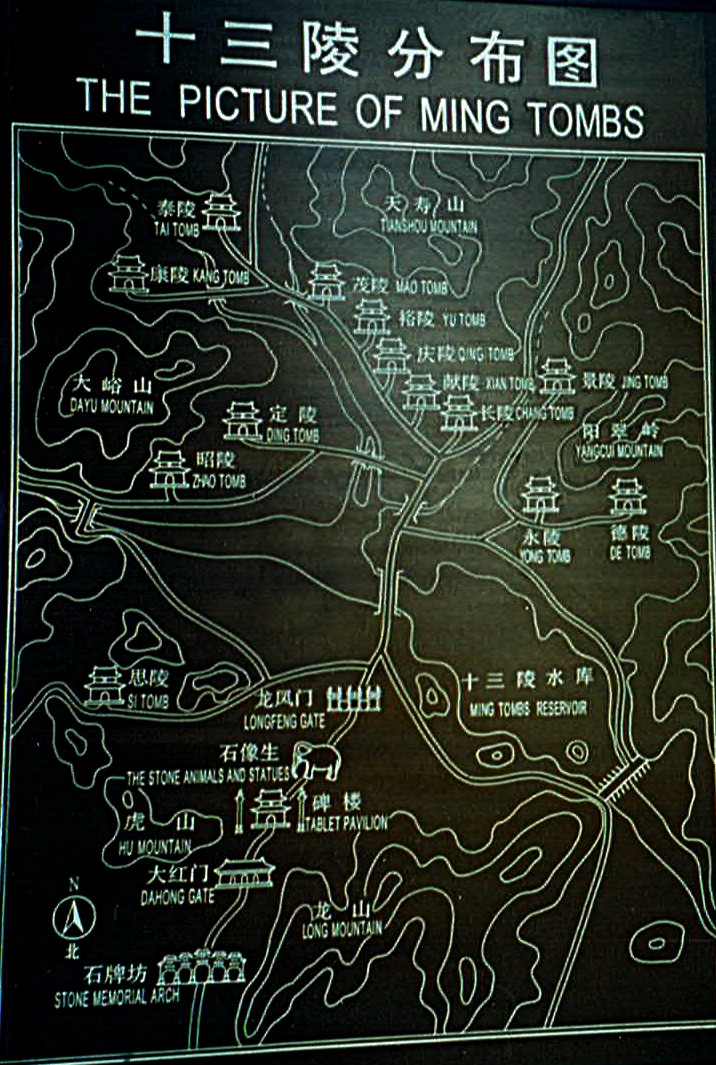
Tourist map showing locations of the Ming Tombs

From the Yongle Emperor onwards, thirteen Ming emperors were buried in the same area. The Hongwu Emperor's Xiaoling Mausoleum is located near his capital Nanjing; the second emperor, the Jianwen Emperor (r. 1398–1402), was overthrown by the Yongle Emperor and disappeared, without a known tomb. The "temporary" emperor, the Jingtai Emperor (r. 1449–1457), was also not buried here, as the Tianshun Emperor (r. 1457–1464) had denied him an imperial burial; instead, the Jingtai Emperor was buried west of Beijing. The last emperor buried at the location was Chongzhen (r. 1627–1644), the last of his dynasty, who committed suicide by hanging on April 25, 1644. He was buried in his concubine Consort Tian's tomb, which was later declared as an imperial mausoleum Siling by the emperor of the short-lived Shun dynasty, Li Zicheng, with a much smaller scale compared to the other imperial mausoleums built for Ming emperors.

During the Ming dynasty, the tombs were off limits to commoners, but in 1644 Li Zicheng's army ransacked and burned many of the tombs before advancing to and subsequently capturing Beijing in April of that year. Li Zicheng then ascended the throne as the first emperor of the short lived Shun dynasty.

In 1725, the Yongzheng Emperor bestowed the hereditary title of marquis on a descendant of the Ming imperial family, Zhu Zhilian, who received a salary from the Qing government and whose duty was to perform rituals at the Ming tombs. He was posthumously promoted to Marquis of Extended Grace in 1750 by the Qianlong Emperor, and the title passed on through twelve generations of Ming descendants until the end of the Qing dynasty.

Presently, the Ming tombs are designated as one of the components of the World Heritage Site, the Imperial Tombs of the Ming and Qing Dynasties, which also includes a number of other locations near Beijing and in Nanjing, Hebei, Hubei, Liaoning province.

== Layout ==
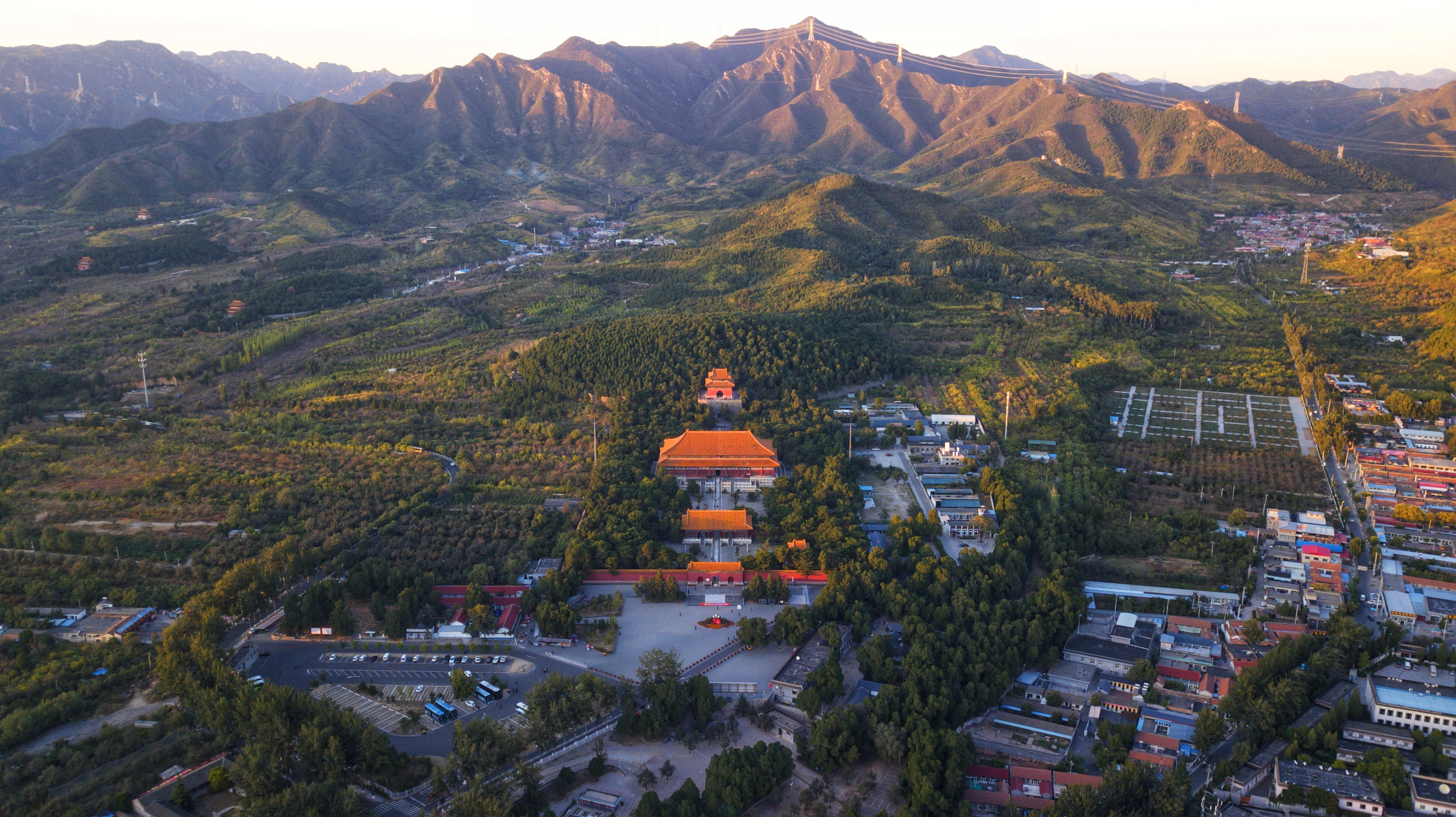
An overview of the Changling Mausoleum

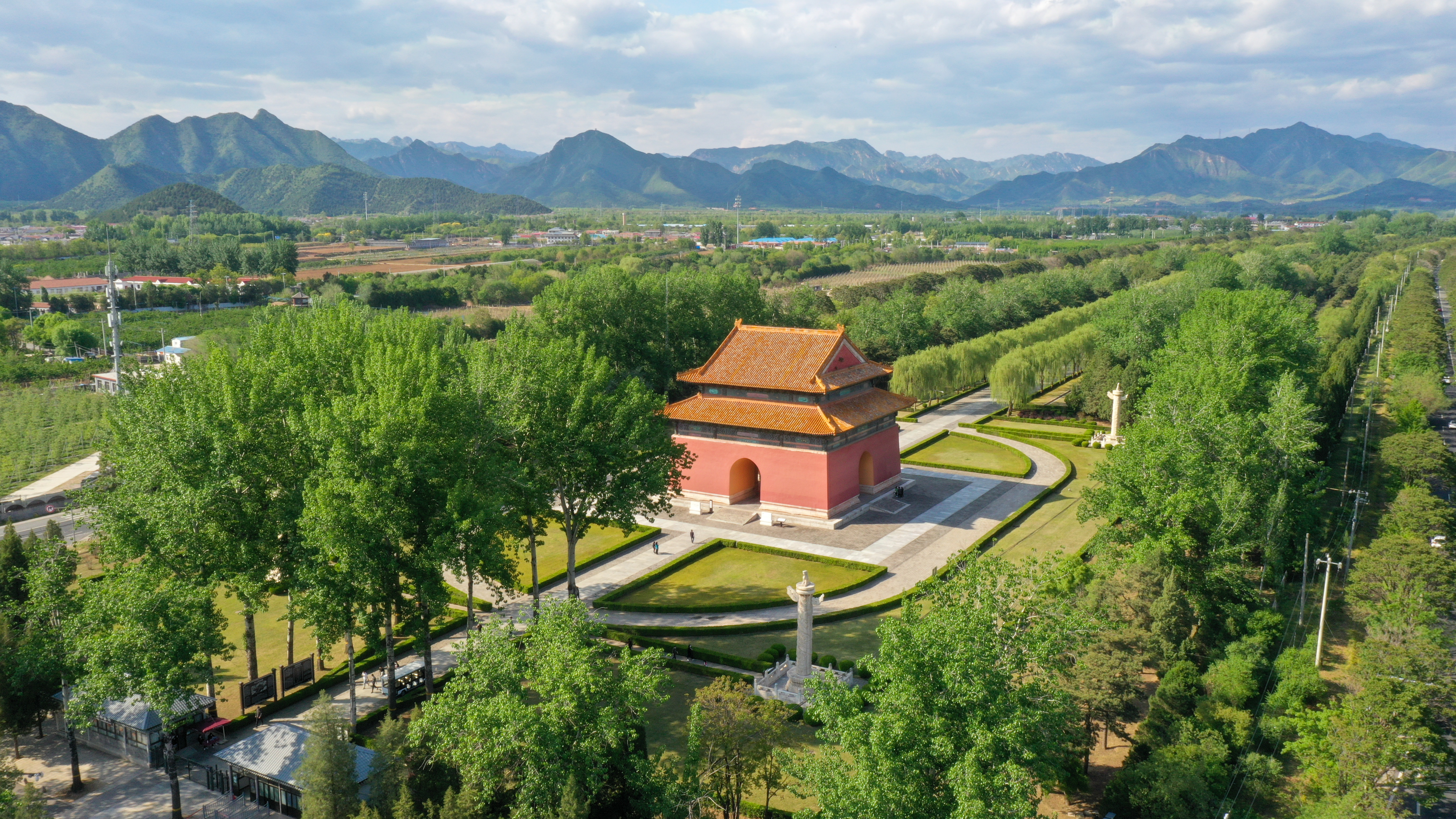
The Spirit Way pass through emperor pavilion

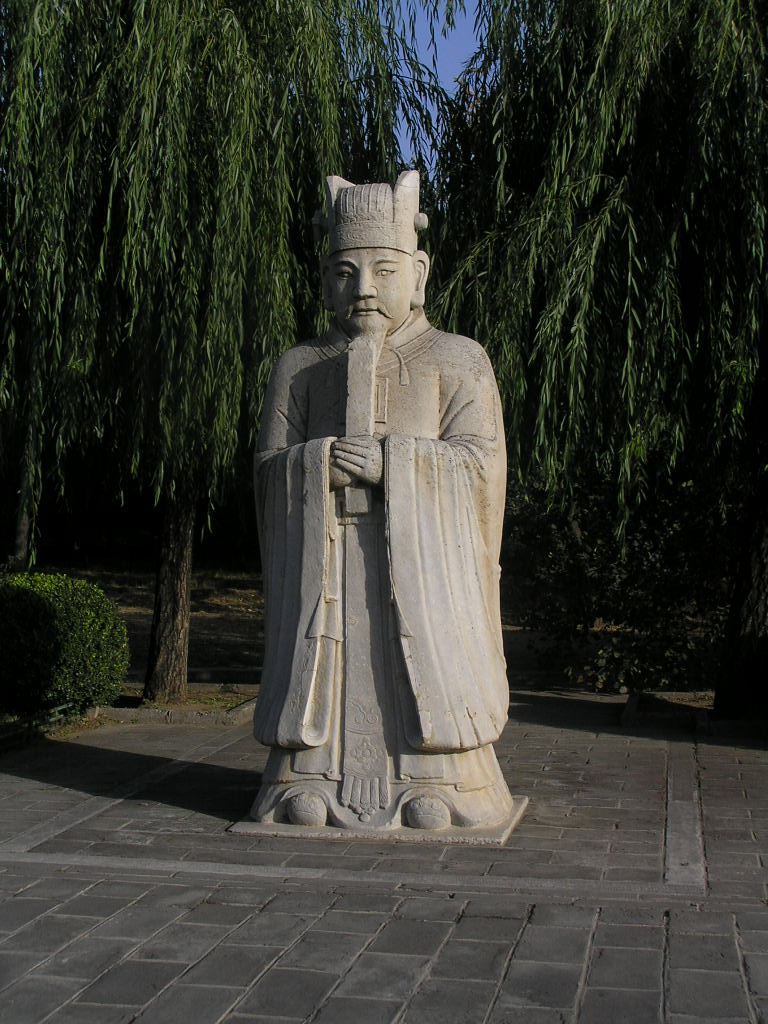
Statue in the Ming tombs grounds

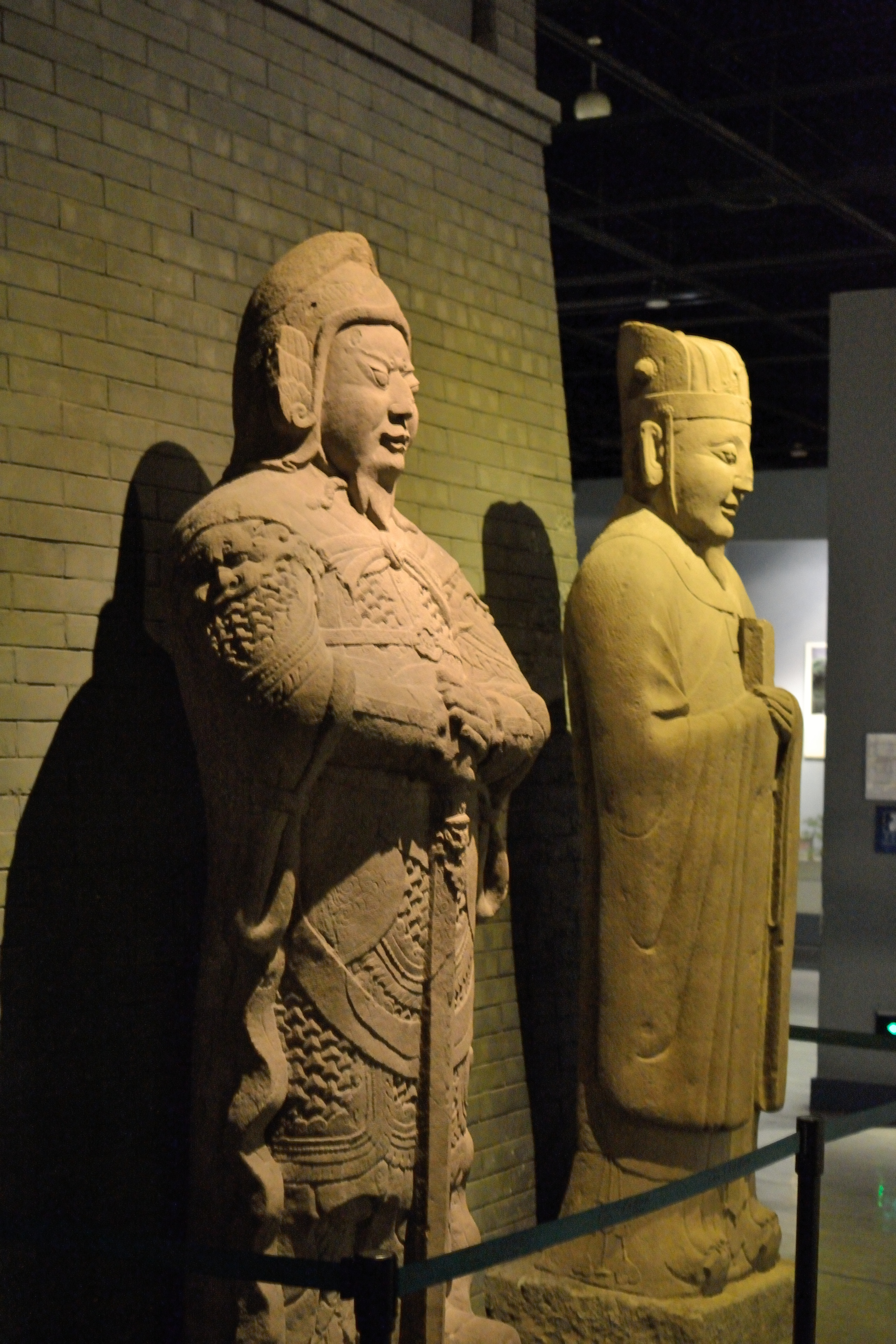
Tomb guardian statues of a warrior and official, Ming period

The siting of the Ming dynasty imperial tombs was carefully chosen according to Feng Shui (geomancy) principles. According to these, bad spirits and evil winds descending from the North must be deflected; therefore, an arc-shaped valley area at the foot of the Tianshou Mountain, north of Beijing, was selected. This 40 km^{2} (15 sq mi) area—enclosed by the mountains in a pristine, quiet valley full of dark earth, tranquil water and other necessities as per Feng Shui—would become the necropolis of the Ming dynasty.

A 7-kilometer (4 mi) road named the "Spirit Way" (pinyin: Shéndào) leads into the complex, lined with statues of guardian animals and officials, with a front gate consisting of a three-arches, painted red, and called the "Great Red Gate". The Spirit Way, or Sacred Way, starts with a huge stone memorial archway lying at the front of the area. Constructed in 1540, during the Ming dynasty, this archway is one of the biggest stone archways in China today.

Further in, the Shengong Shengde Stele Pavilion can be seen; inside, there is a 50-ton stone statue of a Bixi carrying a memorial tablet. Four white marble Huabiao (pillars of glory) are positioned at each corner of the stele pavilion. At the top of each pillar is a mythical beast. Each side of the road is flanked by two pillars whose surfaces are carved with the cloud design, and tops are shaped like a rounded cylinder. They are of a traditional design, and were originally beacons to guide the soul of the deceased, The road leads to 18 pairs of stone statues of mythical animals, which are all sculpted from whole stones and larger than life size, leading to a three-arched gate known as the Dragon and Phoenix Gate.

At present, only three tombs are open to the public:

- Changling, the largest (40°18′5.16″N 116°14′35.45″E);
- Dingling, whose underground palace has been excavated (40°17′42.43″N 116°12′58.53″E); and
- Zhaoling.

There have been no excavations since 1989, but plans for new archeological research and further opening of tombs have circulated.

The Ming tombs were listed as a UNESCO World Heritage Site in August 2003. They were listed along with other tombs under the "Imperial Tombs of the Ming and Qing Dynasties" designation.

Watercolor overview of the Ming tombs

== List of the Imperial Tombs ==
The imperial tombs are in chronological order and list the individuals buried:

Name	Chinese/pinyin	Emperor	Empresses and imperial concubines	Date	Picture	Coordinate
Changling	Chinese: 長陵; pinyin: Cháng Líng	Yongle Emperor	Empress Renxiaowen	1424		40°18′5.16″N 116°14′35.45″E
Xianling	Chinese: 獻陵; pinyin: Xiàn Líng	Hongxi Emperor	Empress Chengxiaozhao	1425		40°18′18.12″N 116°14′15.61″E
Jingling	Chinese: 景陵; pinyin: Jǐng Líng; lit. 'Scenic Tomb'	Xuande Emperor	Empress Xiaogongzhang	1435		40°17′54.14″N 116°15′08.52″E
Yuling	Chinese: 裕陵; pinyin: Yù Líng	Zhengtong Emperor	Empress Xiaozhuangrui; Empress Xiaosu	1449		40°18′49.33″N 116°13′55.56″E
Maoling	Chinese: 茂陵; pinyin: Mào Líng	Chenghua Emperor	Empress Xiaomu; Empress Xiaozhenchun; Empress Xiaohui	1487		40°18′51.60″N 116°13′36.17″E
Tailing	Chinese: 泰陵; pinyin: Tài Líng	Hongzhi Emperor	Empress Xiaochengjing	1505		40°19′23.33″N 116°12′59.90″E
Kangling	Chinese: 康陵; pinyin: Kāng Líng	Zhengde Emperor	Empress Xiaojingyi	1521		40°19′10.03″N 116°12′13.40″E
Yongling	Chinese: 永陵; pinyin: Yǒng Líng	Jiajing Emperor	Empress Xiaojiesu; Empress Xiaolie; Empress Xiaoke	1566		40°17′18.09″N 116°15′06.05″E
Zhaoling	(Chinese: 昭陵; pinyin: Zhāo Líng	Longqing Emperor	Empress Xiaoyizhuang; Empress Xiao'an; Empress Dowager Xiaoding	1572		40°17′28.76″N 116°12′38.55″E
Qingling	Chinese: 慶陵; pinyin: Qìng Líng	Taichang Emperor	Empress Xiaoyuanzhen; Empress Dowager Xiaohe; Empress Dowager Xiaochun	1620		40°18′29.43″N 116°14′01.32″E
Dingling	Chinese: 定陵; pinyin: Dìng Líng; lit. 'Tomb of Stability'	Wanli Emperor	Empress Xiaoduanxian; Empress Dowager Xiaojing	1620		40°17′42.43″N 116°12′58.53″E
Deling	Chinese: 德陵; pinyin: Dé Líng	Tianqi Emperor	Empress Xiao'aizhe	1627		40°17′15.01″N 116°15′35.91″E
Siling	Chinese: 思陵; pinyin: Sī Líng	Chongzhen Emperor	Empress Xiaojie; Noble Consort Tian	1644		40°16′08.69″N 116°11′32.64″E

The Ming emperors not buried in one of the Thirteen Tombs are: Hongwu Emperor, Zhu Biao, Emperor Kang, Jianwen Emperor, Jingtai Emperor, and Zhu Youyuan, Emperor Xian.

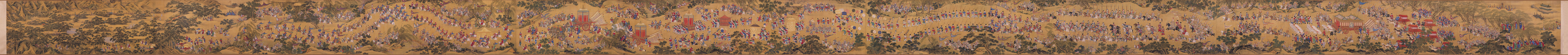
The panorama painting "Departure Herald", painted during the reign of the Jiajing Emperor (1521–1567 AD), shows the emperor traveling on horseback with a large escort through the countryside from Beijing's Imperial City to the Ming tombs.

== Images ==
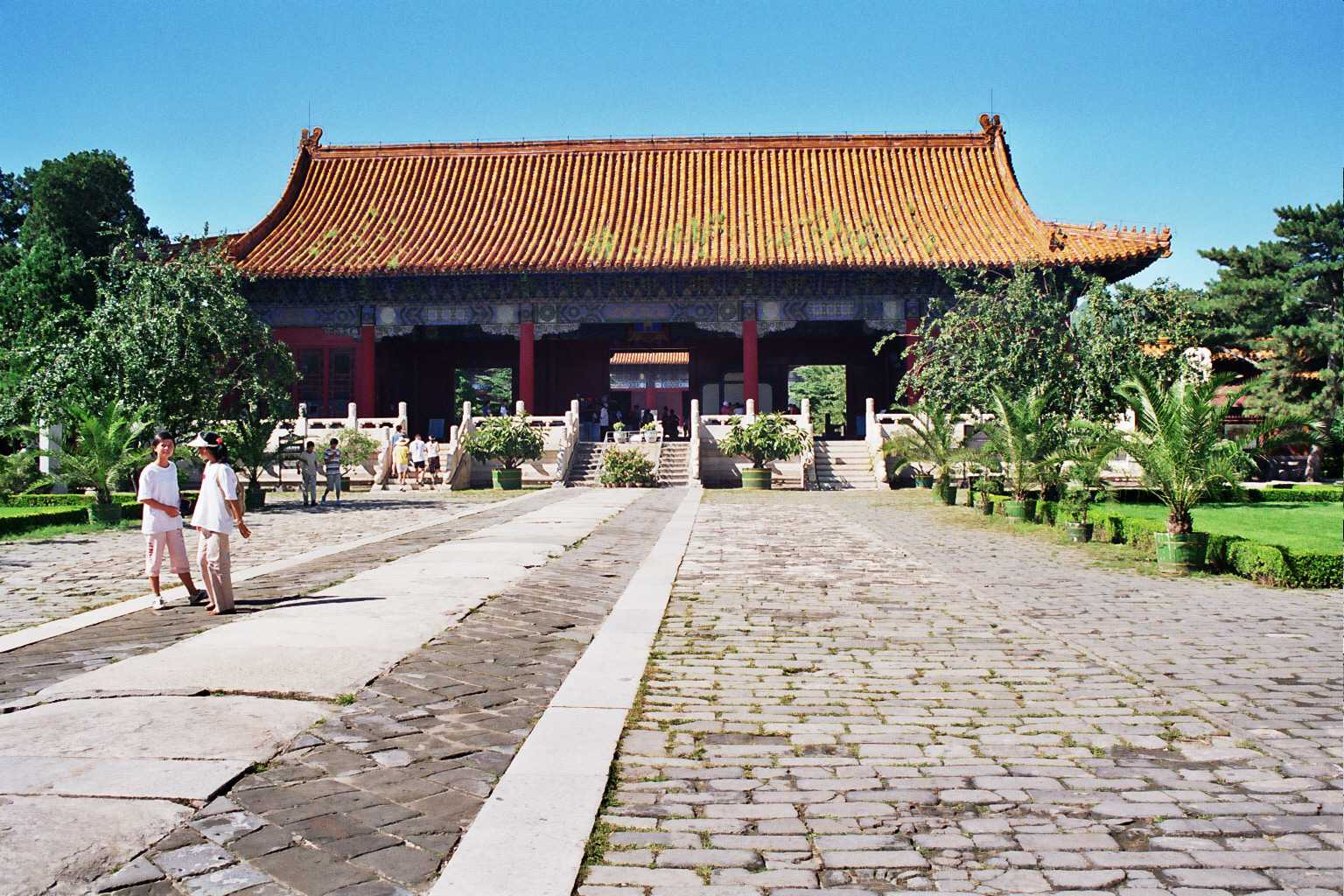
An entrance to a Ming tomb

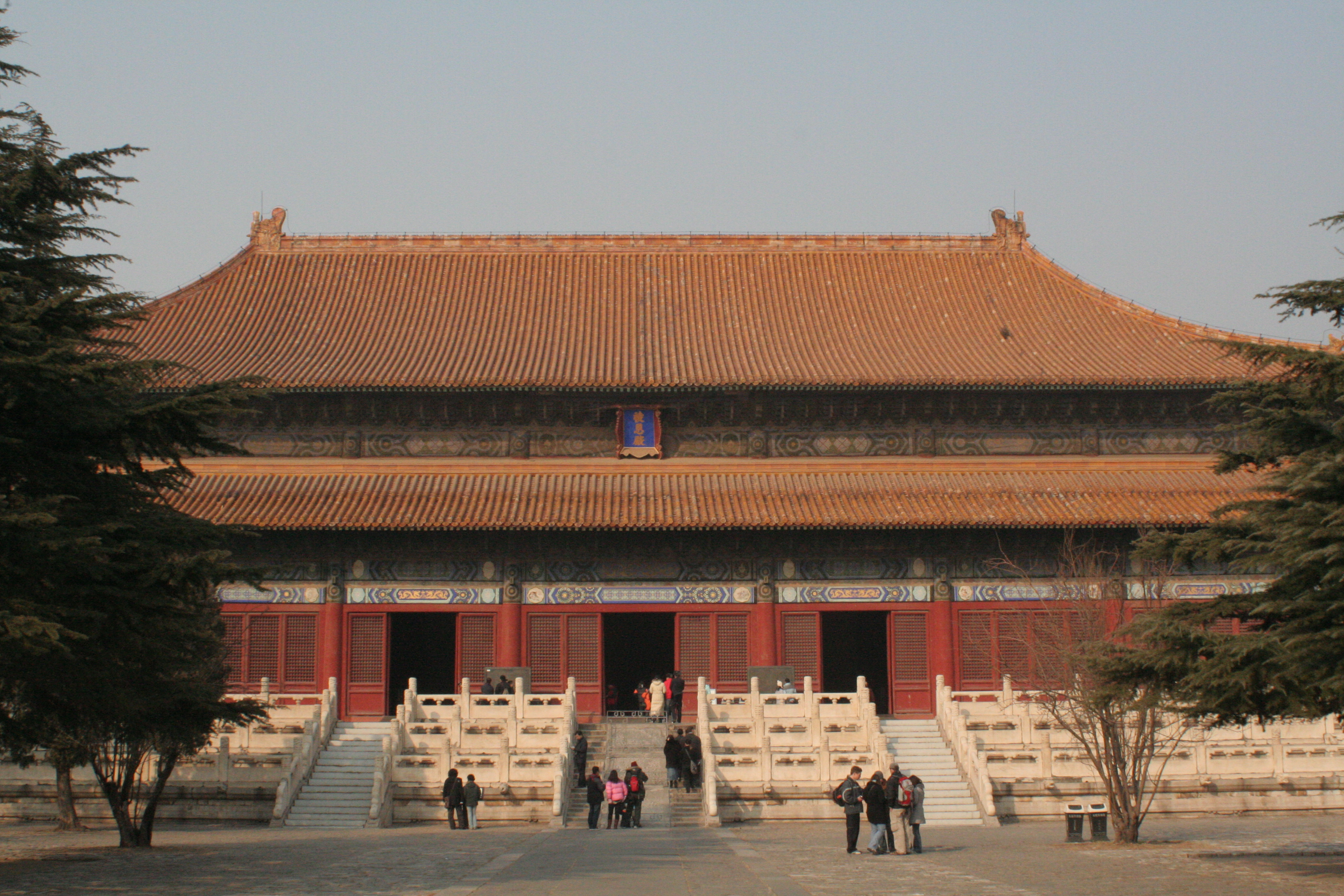
Ling'en Hall of Changling Mausoleum

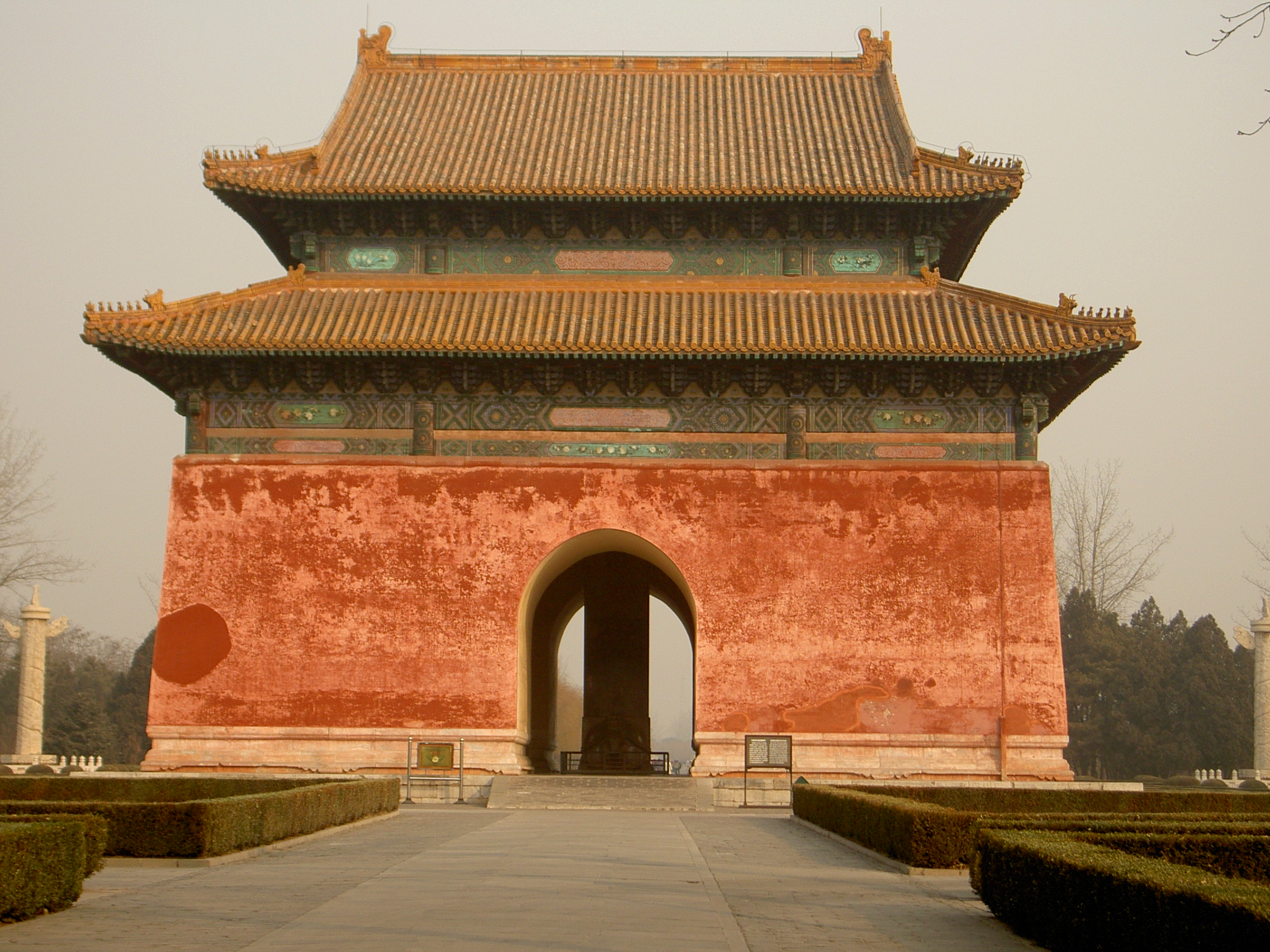
Shengong Shengde Stele Pavilion at the beginning of the sacred walk leading to the tombs

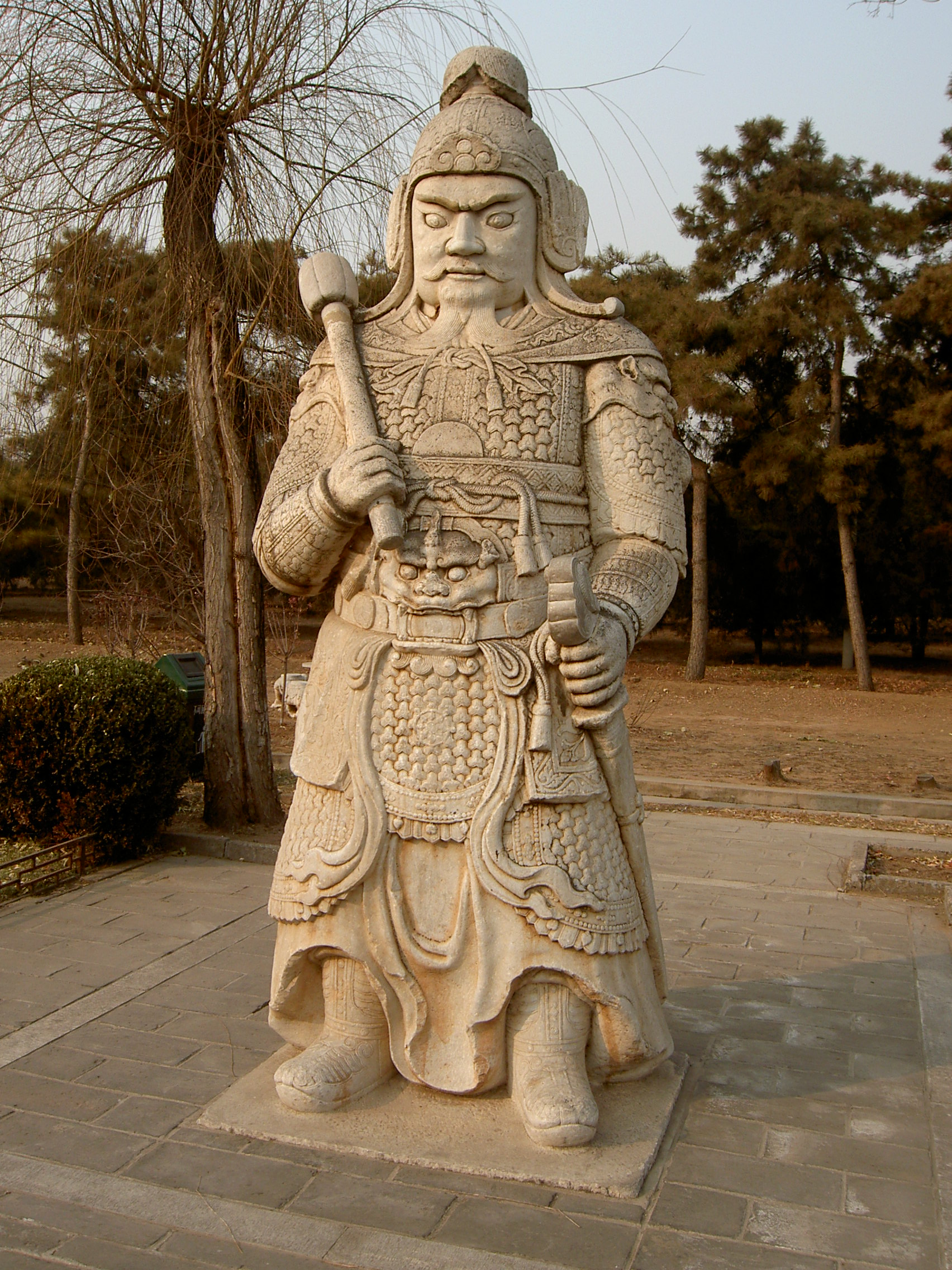
A statue inside the Ming tombs

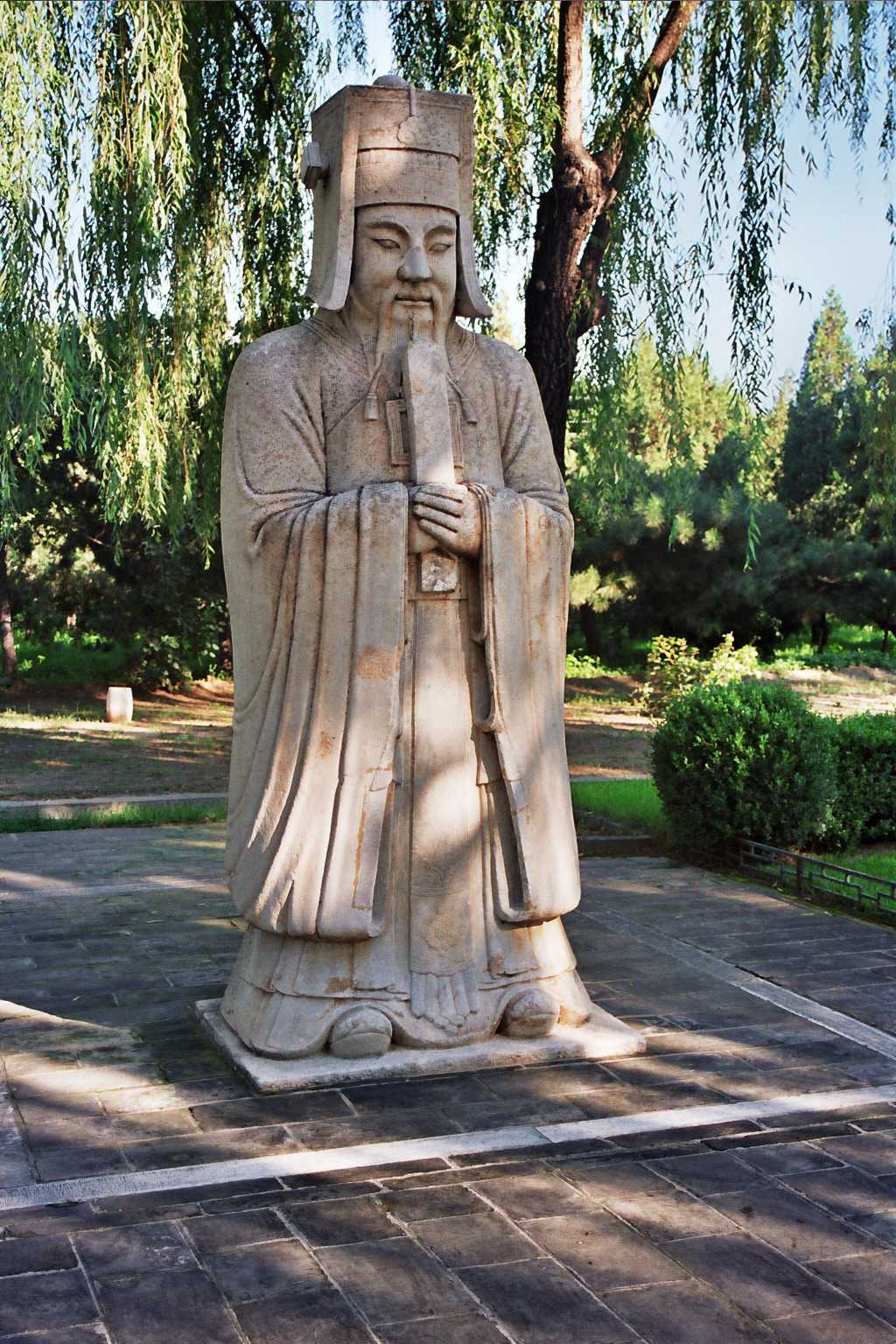
A statue inside the Ming tombs

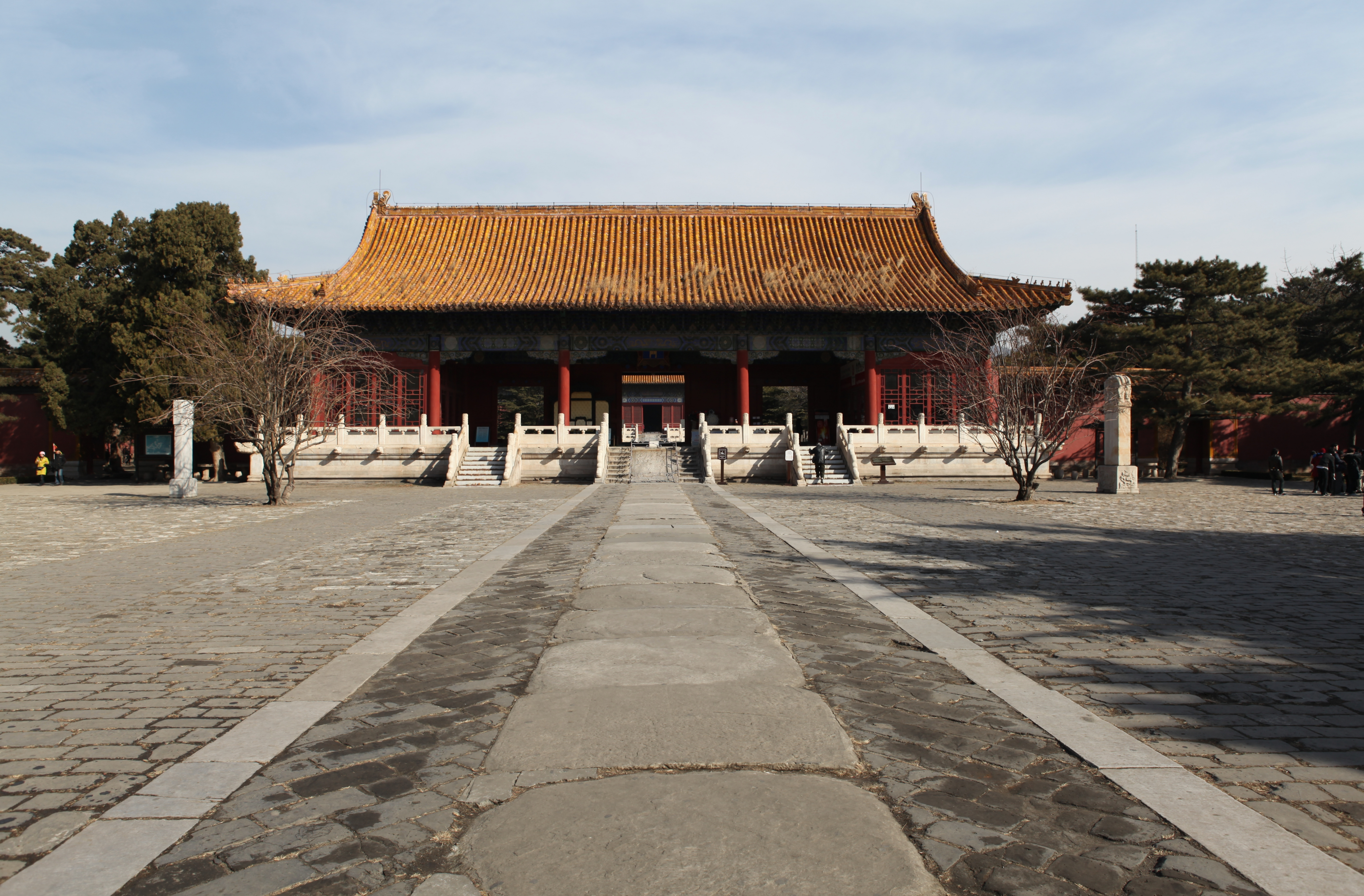
Ling'en Gate of Changling Mausoleum

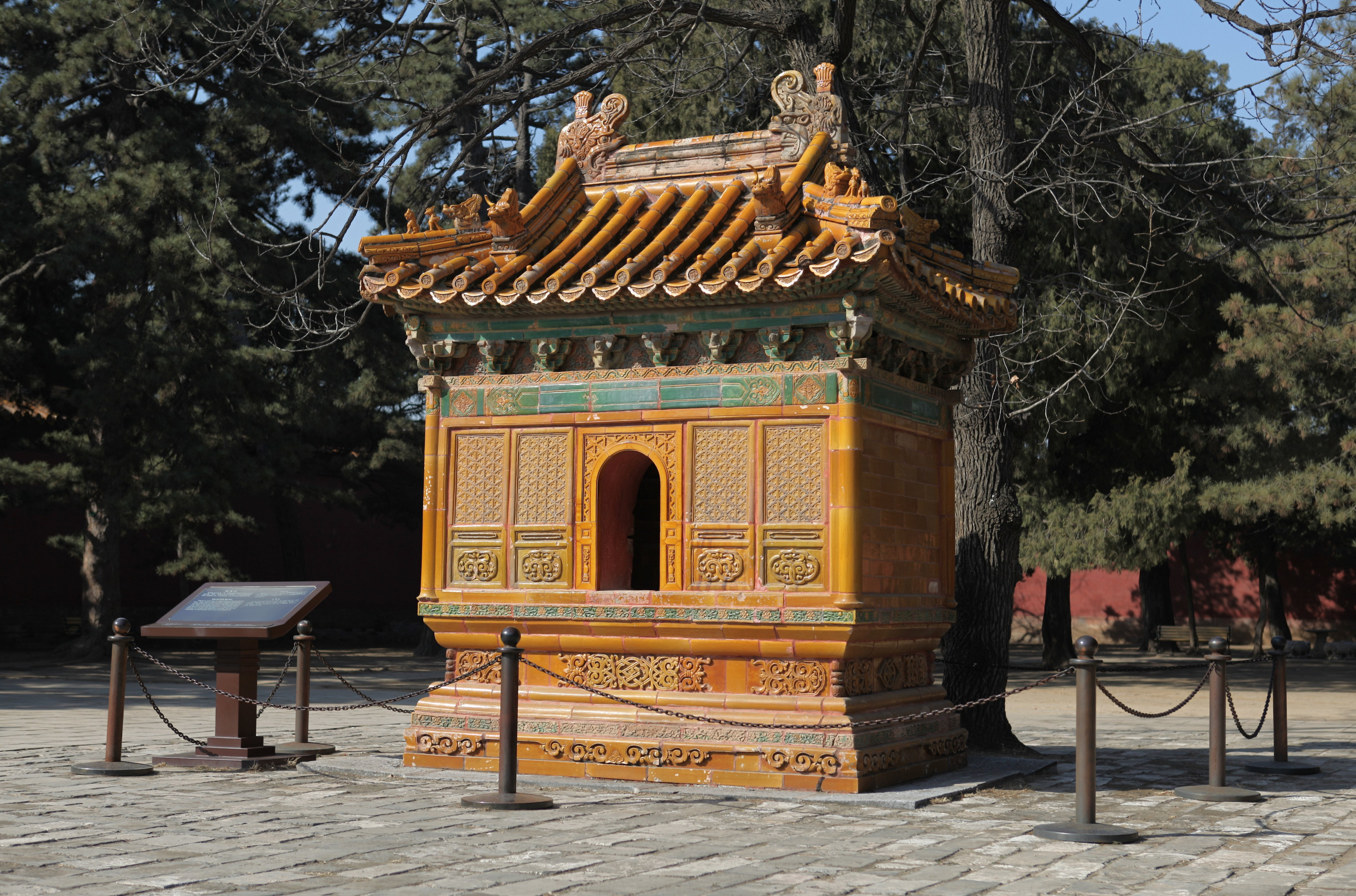
A silk burning stove at the Changling Mausoleum

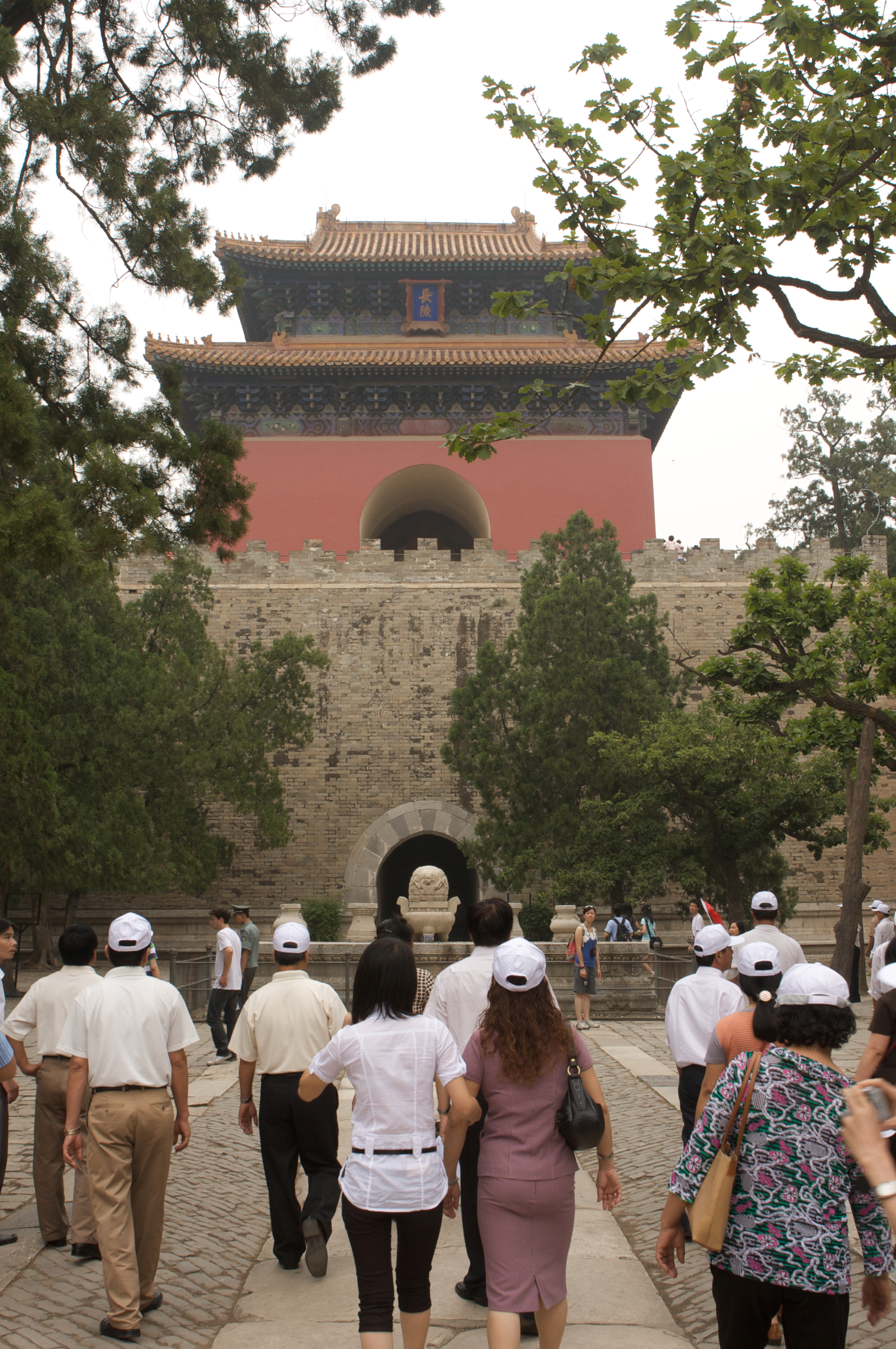
Minglou Tower of Changling Mausoleum

== See also ==
- Ming Xiaoling Mausoleum in Nanjing
- Ming Ancestors Mausoleum in Jiangsu Province
- Eastern Qing tombs near Beijing
- Western Qing tombs near Beijing

The three imperial tombs north of the great wall

- Fuling Tomb east of Shenyang in Liaoning
- Zhao Mausoleum north of Shenyang in Liaoning
- Yongling Tombs east of Fushun in Liaoning
