= Taichang Emperor =

Emperor of China in 1620

Taichang Emperor 泰昌帝
- Palace portrait on a hanging scroll

Emperor of the Ming dynasty
- Reign: 28 August 1620 – 26 September 1620
- Enthronement: 28 August 1620
- Predecessor: Wanli Emperor
- Successor: Tianqi Emperor
- Born: 28 August 1582
- Died: 26 September 1620 (aged 38)
- Burial: Qing Mausoleum, Ming tombs, Beijing
- Consorts: Empress Xiaoyuanzhen (m. 1601; died 1613) Empress Dowager Xiaohe (died 1619) Empress Dowager Xiaochun (died 1614)
- Issue Detail: Tianqi Emperor; Chongzhen Emperor
Era dates
- Taichang: (Note: Chinese: 泰昌; pinyin: Tàichāng) 28 August 1620 – 21 January 1621 (Note: The Taichang era was officially announced to begin on the first day of the next lunar year (22 January 1621), but the Emperor died before that date. At the recommendation of a Donglin leader, the court resolved to define the Taichang era as covering the period from the Emperor's accession on 28 August 1620 to the end of the current lunar year on 21 January 1621.)
Posthumous name
- Emperor Chongtian Qidao Yingrui Gongchun Xianwen Jingwu Yuanren Yixiao Zhen (Note: Simplified Chinese: 崇天契道英睿恭纯宪文景武渊仁懿孝贞皇帝; traditional Chinese: 崇天契道英睿恭純憲文景武淵仁懿孝貞皇帝 (conferred by the Tianqi Emperor in 1620))
Temple name
- Guangzong (Note: Chinese: 光宗; pinyin: Guāngzōng)
- House: Zhu
- Dynasty: Ming
- Father: Wanli Emperor
- Mother: Lady Wang

Chinese name
- Chinese: 泰昌帝
Transcriptions
Standard Mandarin
- Hanyu Pinyin: Tàichāng Dì
- Wade–Giles: Tʻai^{4}-chʻang^{1} Ti^{4}
- IPA: [tʰâɪ.ʈʂʰáŋ tî]

The Taichang Emperor (28 August 1582 – 26 September 1620), personal name Zhu Changluo, (Note: Chinese: 朱常洛; pinyin: Zhū Chángluò) was the 15th emperor of the Ming dynasty of China. He was the eldest son of the Wanli Emperor and succeeded his father as emperor in 1620. His reign came to an abrupt end less than one month after his enthronement when he was found dead one morning in the palace following a bout of diarrhea. His reign was the shortest in Ming history.

Zhu Changluo was born during the tenth year of the Wanli Emperor's reign. His mother, Lady Wang, was a servant of the Emperor's mother. Lady Wang was promoted, but did not gain the favor of the Wanli Emperor, and the Emperor ignored their son. Instead, he favored another concubine, Lady Zheng, and her son, Zhu Changxun. The Emperor intended to appoint Zhu Changxun as heir to the throne, but this choice faced strong opposition from the ministers. Due to the stubbornness of both sides, the matter remained at a standstill for many years. Under pressure from his mother and officials, the Emperor formally appointed the nineteen-year-old Zhu Changluo as heir in 1601, but schemes against the heir persisted at court. This tension culminated in a serious incident in 1615 that threatened the heir's safety and raised suspicions about the involvement of figures close to Lady Zheng.

The Wanli Emperor died on 18 August 1620, and Zhu Changluo officially ascended the throne as the Taichang Emperor on 28 August. However, just a few days after his coronation, he fell ill and died on 26 September, despite attempts at treatment. The Taichang Emperor's eldest son, Zhu Youjiao, was then enthroned as the Tianqi Emperor. The death of the relatively young emperor sparked suspicion, speculation, and recrimination among different court factions.

== Early life ==
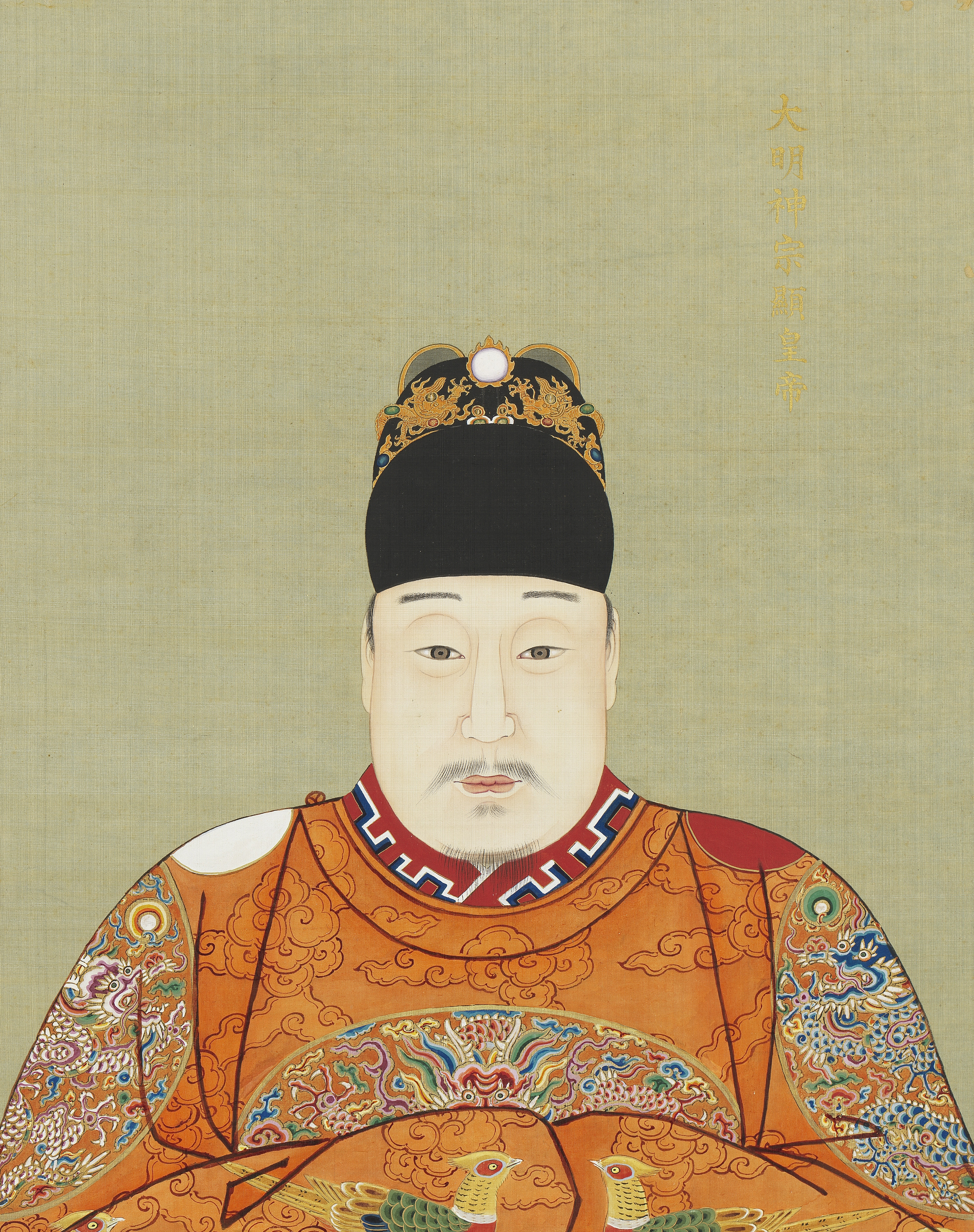
The Wanli Emperor, the father and predecessor of the Taichang Emperor

Zhu Changluo, the future Taichang Emperor, was born on 28 August 1582 in the imperial palace in Beijing as the first son of the Wanli Emperor, the 14th emperor of China's Ming dynasty. His mother, Lady Wang, was a servant of Empress Dowager Li, the Emperor's mother. Although the Wanli Emperor initially wanted nothing to do with the child, the Empress Dowager convinced him to acknowledge paternity by presenting records of his visits. She also pushed for Lady Wang's promotion to imperial concubine with the title "Consort Gong" (恭妃). The Emperor's interest in Lady Wang quickly faded as he became infatuated with another concubine, Lady Zheng, who bore him another son, Zhu Changxun (1586–1641).

In 1586, the question of succession arose when the Emperor promoted Lady Zheng to the rank of "Imperial Noble Consort" (Huang Guifei), placing her just below the Empress and above his other concubines, including Lady Wang. He preferred Zhu Changxun, his third son, to succeed him rather than Zhu Changluo. This caused a divide among officials, with some advocating for the rights of the first son based on legal primogeniture, while others supported Lady Zheng and her son. Widespread support for the eldest son led the Emperor to delay making a decision, stating that he was waiting for a son from the Empress. (Note: In the Ming dynasty, imperial succession followed the principle of primogeniture. According to the Ancestral Instructions of the Hongwu Emperor, the founder of the dynasty, the throne was to be inherited by the eldest son born to the emperor and empress, or by his direct heir, followed by younger sons of the empress. Sons born to concubines were excluded from succession.) A request was made to appoint Zhu Changluo as heir to the throne at the age of eight so that his education could officially begin. The Emperor, however, argued that princes were traditionally taught by court eunuchs.

In 1589, the Emperor agreed to have Zhu Changluo installed as his successor. Lady Zheng opposed this decision, causing considerable controversy. Two years later, the circulation of a pamphlet in Beijing accusing her of conspiring with senior officials against the Emperor's eldest son led to arrests. Despite this, the Emperor tried to portray Lady Zheng in a positive light to the public.

The failure to name a successor sparked protests from not only opposition-minded officials, but also high dignitaries such as the grand secretaries Shen Shixing (in office 1578–91) and Wang Xijue (in office 1584–91 and 1593–94). The Empress and Empress Dowager Li also supported the rights of Zhu Changluo, but the Wanli Emperor did not appoint him heir to the throne until 1601, after further protests and requests. At the same time, the Emperor gave Zhu Changxun the title of Prince of Fu, but kept him in Beijing instead of sending him to a distant province as originally planned when he turned eighteen in 1604. This fueled rumors that the question of succession was still open. It was not until 1614, after a long series of appeals and protests, that Empress Dowager Li intervened and insisted on sending Zhu Changxun to the provincial seat.

== Case of the attack with the stick ==
In late May 1615, the "case of the attack with the stick" (梃擊案) occurred, when a man named Zhang Chai was arrested near Zhu Changluo's palace for carrying a stick. It was later concluded that Zhang, who was mentally unstable, had intended to use the stick to settle a personal conflict with two palace eunuchs he had encountered outside the city. Initially, the case was closed and Zhang was executed, but prison official Wang Zhicai intervened and pushed for a public investigation involving representatives from the Ministry of Justice. This new version of the case suggested that Zhang Chai was mentally sound and had been manipulated by two eunuchs close to Lady Zheng and her brother. This raised suspicions that their goal was to kill the heir and install Lady Zheng's son in his place. The case caused a stir at court and the Wanli Emperor took the unprecedented step of summoning civil and military officials for a meeting. This was the first time the Emperor had met with officials from the "outer court" since 1602. He appeared before them with his family, including Zhu Changluo and his sons and daughter, and expressed his disappointment and disbelief that they would doubt his relationship with the heir in whom he trusted and relied upon. Zhu Changluo also confirmed his close relationship with his father and asked for an end to the affair. Despite this, the Emperor ordered the execution of Zhang and the two eunuchs involved in the case, but representatives from the Ministry of Justice demanded further investigation and the grand secretaries brokered a compromise. Zhang Chai was executed the next day, but the suspected eunuchs were to be interrogated. The interrogation did take place, but both eunuchs remained under the supervision of the Emperor's eunuchs. On the fifth day after the Emperor's speech, the officials were informed that the two eunuchs had died under palace confinement.

== Reign ==
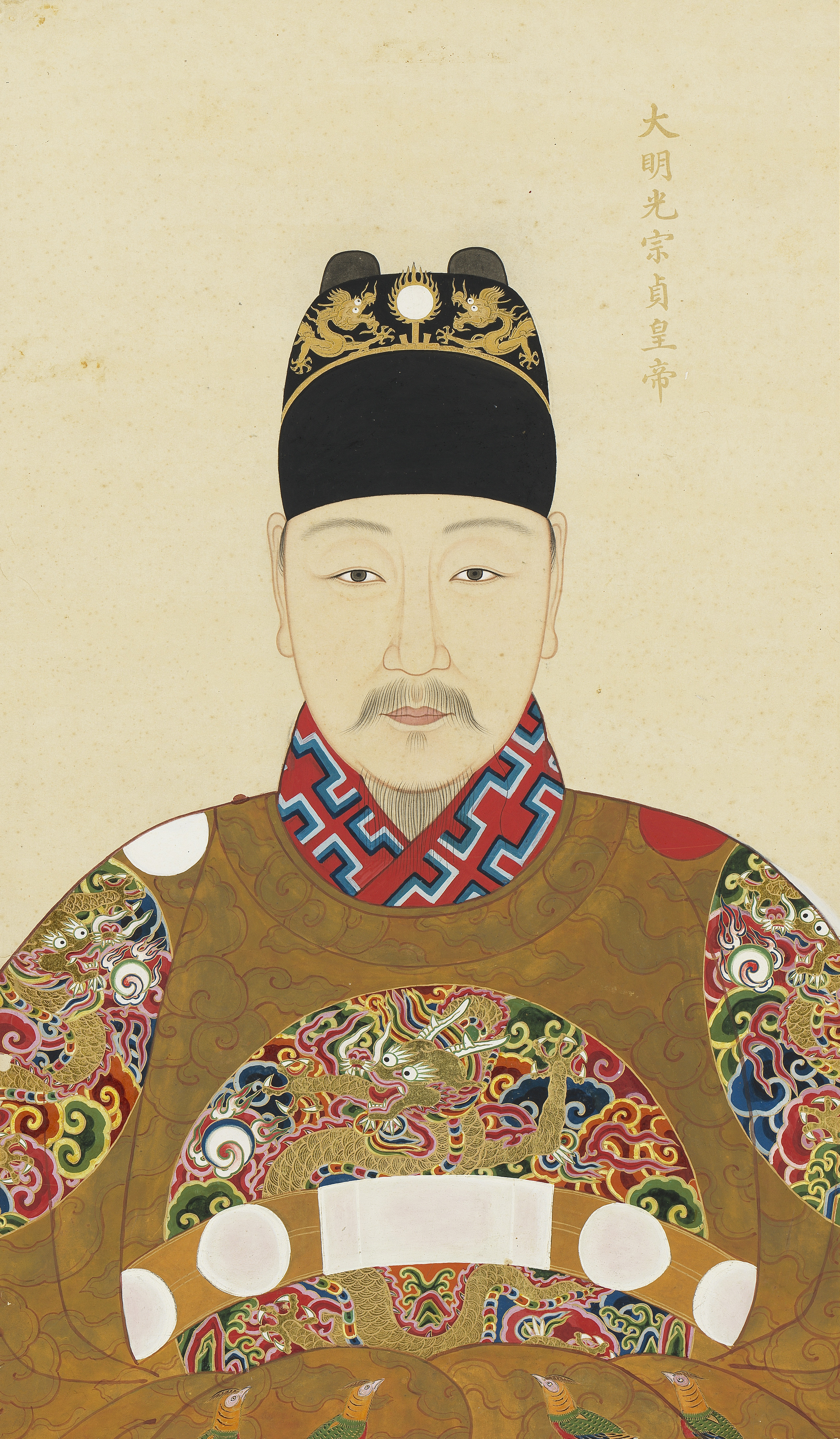
Portrait of the Taichang Emperor

On 18 August 1620, the Wanli Emperor died. Zhu Changluo officially took the throne on 28 August 1620. He chose the name Taichang for his era, symbolizing peace and prosperity in contrast to the turmoil of the previous reign. Many people in Beijing saw the new monarch as a chance for a fresh start. Since he had not been his father's first choice and the two had never been close, there was hope that he would abandon the Wanli Emperor's policies and implement necessary reforms. On 19 August, 1 million liang (37.3 tons) of silver was sent from the palace treasury to defend the northeastern borders. The situation in Liaodong had become critical, as Nurhaci's Jurchens were launching attacks. Additionally, the mining and commercial taxes that had been introduced in the 1590s were abolished, and the eunuch tax commissioners, who were responsible for collecting these taxes, were recalled from the provinces. All of these actions were carried out in accordance with the last wishes of the deceased emperor. On 21 August, the Taichang Emperor sent another million liang of silver to Liaodong.

To address long-standing vacancies in the administration, the Taichang Emperor appointed new officials. Many were critics of the previous government who had been dismissed for opposing the Wanli Emperor. Among the first to be summoned were Zou Yuanbiao (鄒元標; 1551–1624) and Feng Congwu (馮從吾; 1556–1627), both associated with the Donglin movement. (Note: The movement comprised two distinct groups. The first group consisted of scholars and officials who were affiliated with the Donglin Academy. Their goal was to bring about societal improvement and better governance through moral reform. The second group was made up of officials who were embroiled in political disputes and were focused on restoring the integrity of the state service. While they were often associated with the academy, their main role was that of political activists.) Many officials who later became key Donglin figures had supported Zhu Changluo during the dispute over the succession in the 1580s and 1590s.

== Illness and death ==
Three days after his enthronement, the Taichang Emperor fell ill. On 5 September, his condition worsened, and he summoned the physician Chen Xi. During audiences on 8 and 9 September, he appeared unwell and soon took to his bed. On 13 September, Chen Xi visited him again with a group of officials. The Emperor complained of insomnia and loss of appetite. The officials were alarmed. Upon learning that Cui Wensheng (崔文升), the eunuch in charge of the imperial clinic, had administered a laxative to the Emperor, they accused him of incompetence. The officials believed that the Emperor needed strengthening medicine instead. The Emperor refused to accept the accusation, but also stopped taking the laxative.

Several days passed with the Emperor officiating from his bed, but on 17 September, he became overwhelmed and began to speak of his impending death. During a visit from concerned officials, led by Grand Secretary Fang Congzhe, on 25 September, the Emperor requested red pills, which he had heard were being produced by Li Keshao, an assistant director in the Court of State Ceremonial. Li later testified that he believed his pills helped strengthen the Emperor's diseased body. That same day, the imperial guards and eunuchs brought Li to the Emperor, who ordered him to make the pills. In the presence of the thirteen officials, Li made the pills using lead, autumn mineral, human milk and cinnabar. All four were recognised tonic drugs in traditional Chinese medicine, and the Emperor's eunuchs provided them to Li. He then gave one pill to the Emperor, who felt relieved and grew hungry, requesting a second. Li, however, refused, saying that one was sufficient and two would be excessive. The Emperor then sent Li and the officials home after midnight. The following morning at dawn, the eunuchs announced that the Emperor had died. Some members of the Donglin movement accused Li Keshao and Fang Congzhe of poisoning the Emperor, while others among the thirteen officials present took a more cautious approach, attempting to absolve themselves of any negligence. The controversy surrounding the red pills—whether they caused the Emperor's death intentionally or unintentionally, and became known as the Red Pill Case (紅丸案)—sparked heated debates and accusations over the next few years.

After the Taichang Emperor's death, a power struggle emerged over the succession of his fourteen-year-old son, Zhu Youjiao. Lady Li, the Emperor's favored concubine, clashed with the ministers and grand secretaries for control. Despite resistance from Lady Li and her eunuchs, a eunuch loyal to the officials ultimately handed the boy over to them, and Lady Li was subsequently banished to another residence within the palace. (Note: This power struggle became known as the "Change of Palace Case" (移宮案).) Zhu Youjiao officially ascended to the throne as the Tianqi Emperor on 1 October 1620. The Taichang Emperor's fifth son, Zhu Youjian, later ascended the throne and reigned as the Chongzhen Emperor from 1627 to 1644.

== Family ==
The Taichang Emperor's consorts

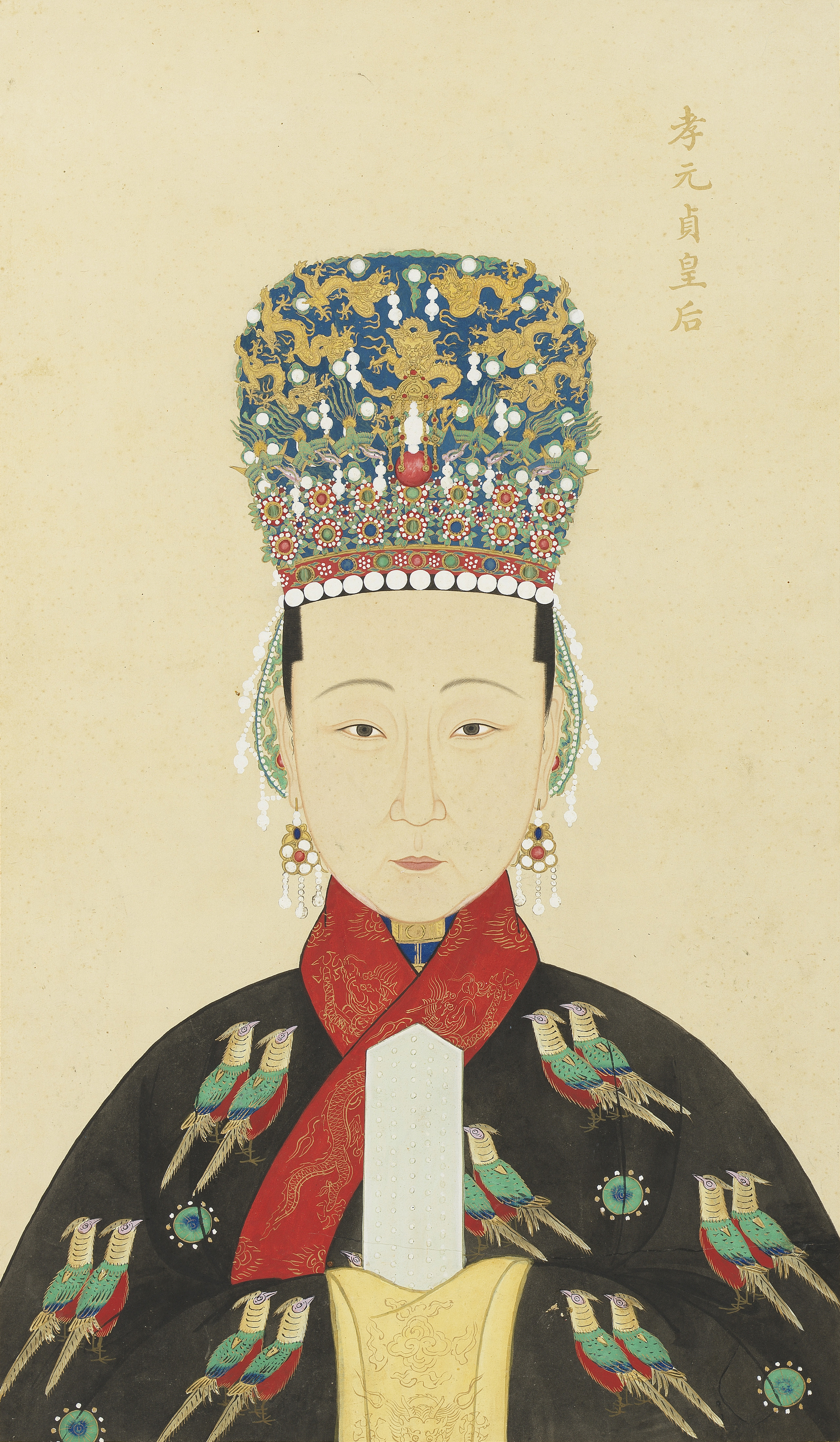
Lady Guo, the Taichang Emperor's first wife

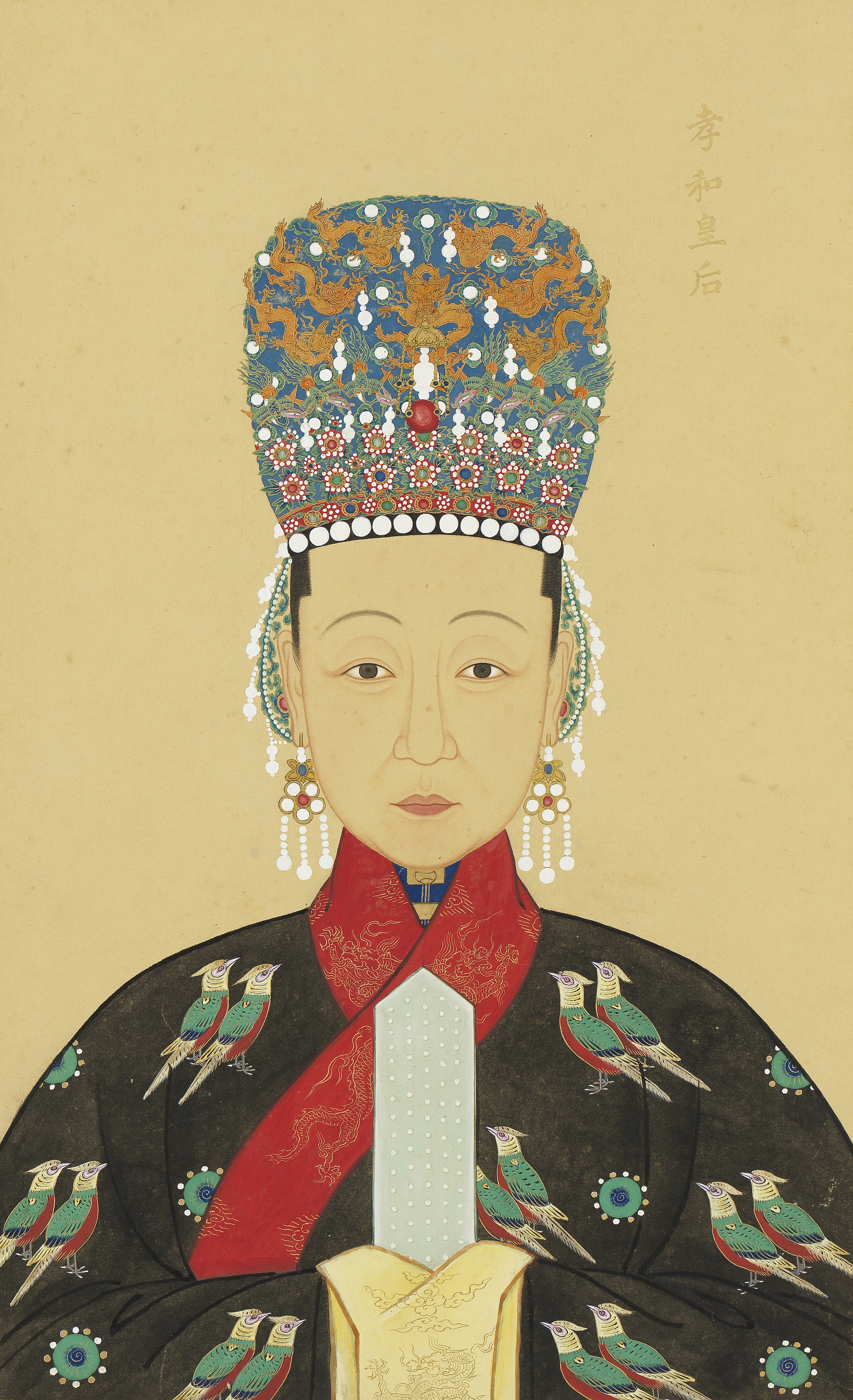
Lady Wang, the mother of the Tianqi Emperor

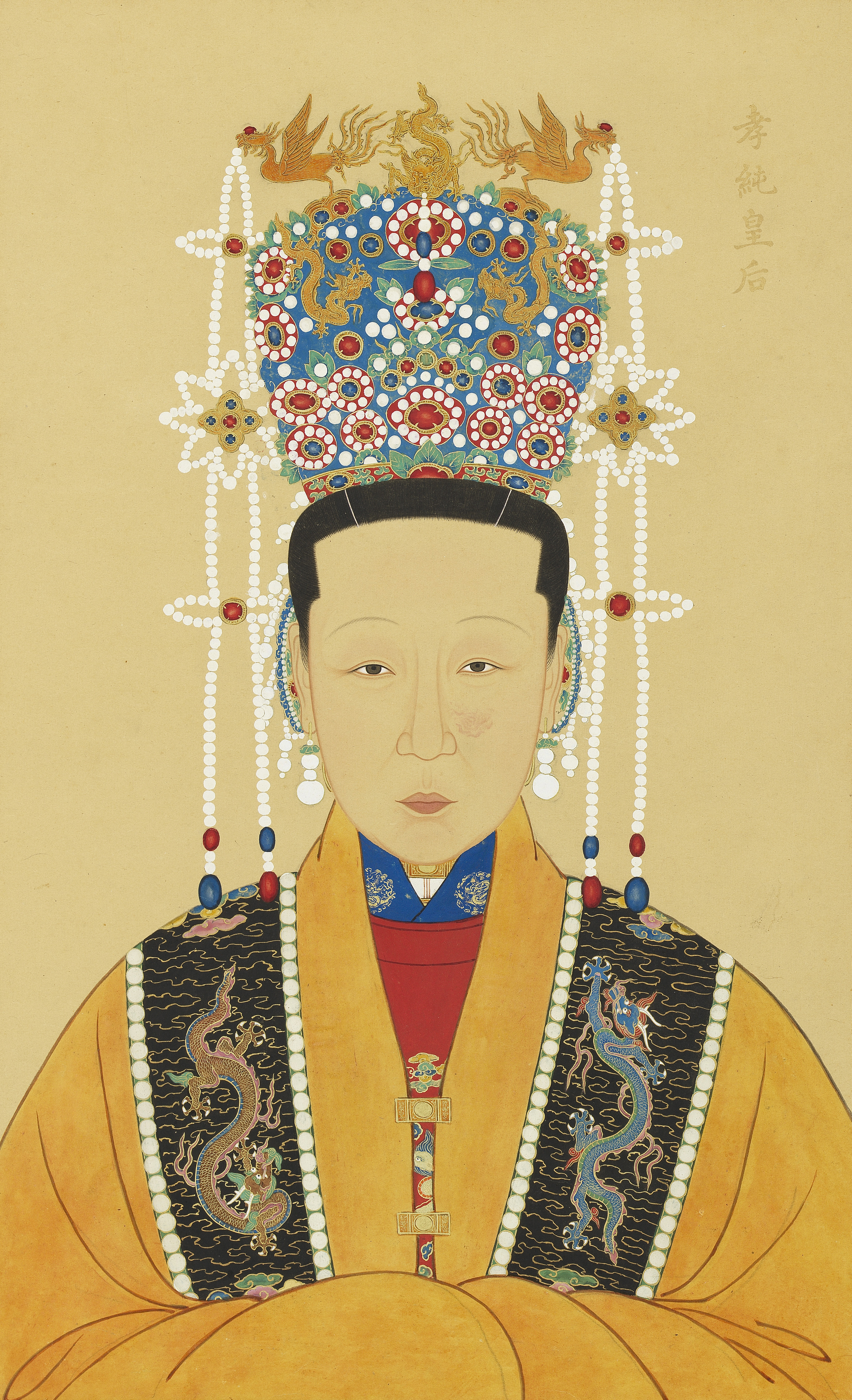
Lady Liu, the mother of the Chongzhen Emperor

- Empress Xiaoyuanzhen (孝元貞皇后) of the Guo clan (郭氏; d. 1613)
  - Princess Huaishu (懷淑公主), personal name Huijian (徽娟), second daughter
- Empress Dowager Xiaohe (孝和皇太后) of the Wang clan (王氏; 1582–1619)
  - Zhu Youjiao (朱由校), the Tianqi Emperor (天啓帝; 1605–1627), first son
  - Zhu Youxue (朱由㰒), Prince Huai of Jian (簡懷王), second son
- Empress Dowager Xiaochun (孝純皇太后) of the Liu clan (劉氏; 1592–1614)
  - Zhu Youjian (朱由檢), the Chongzhen Emperor (崇禎帝; 1611–1644), fifth son
- Consort Gongyihuishunzhuang (恭懿惠順莊妃) of the Li clan (李氏; 1588–1624)
- Consort Yi (懿妃) of the Fu clan (傅氏)
  - Princess Ningde (寧德公主), personal name Huiyan (徽妍), sixth daughter. Married to Liu Youfu (劉有福).
  - Princess Suiping (遂平公主), personal name Huijing (徽婧), seventh daughter. Married in 1627 to Qi Zanyuan (齊贊元).
  - Zhu Youxu (朱由栩), Prince Huai of Xiang (湘懷王), sixth son
- Consort Kang (康妃) of the Li clan (李氏)
  - Zhu Youmo (朱由模), Prince Hui of Huai (懷惠王), fourth son
  - Princess Le'an (樂安公主; d. 1643), personal name Huiti (徽媞), ninth daughter. Married to Gong Yonggu (鞏永固; d. 1644).
- Consort Jing (敬妃) of the Feng clan (馮氏)
  - Zhu Youshan (朱由橏), Prince Zhao of Hui (慧昭王), seventh son
- Concubine Shen (慎嬪) of the Shao clan (邵氏)
  - Princess Daowen (悼溫公主), personal name Huizheng (徽姃), 11th daughter
- Concubine Xiang (襄嬪) of the Zhang clan (張氏)
- Concubine Ke (恪嬪) of the Li clan (李氏)
- Concubine Ding (定嬪) of the Guo clan (郭氏; b. 1591)
- Lady of Selected Service (選侍) of the Wang clan (王氏)
  - Zhu Youji (朱由楫), Prince Si of Qi (齊思王), third son
- Lady of Selected Service (選侍) of the Zhao clan (趙氏; d. 1620)
- Unknown
  - Princess Daoyi (悼懿公主), first daughter
  - Zhu Huiheng (朱徽姮), third daughter
  - Princess Daoshun (悼順公主), personal name Huixian (徽嫙), fourth daughter
  - Zhu Huiweng, (朱徽㜲), fifth daughter
  - Zhu Huiwan (朱徽婉), eighth daughter
  - Zhu Huizhao (朱徽妱), tenth daughter

== See also ==
- Chinese emperors family tree (late)

== Notes ==
Taichang Emperor House of Zhu Born: 28 August 1582 Died: 26 September 1620
Regnal titles
Preceded by Wanli Emperor	Emperor of the Ming dynasty 28 August – 26 September 1620	Succeeded by Tianqi Emperor
Chinese royalty
Vacant Title last held by Zhu Yijun	Crown Prince of the Ming dynasty 1601–1620	Vacant Title next held by Zhu Cilang
