= Empress Xiaoyuanzhen =

Chinese empress (1580–1613)

Empress Xiaoyuanzhen 孝元貞皇后
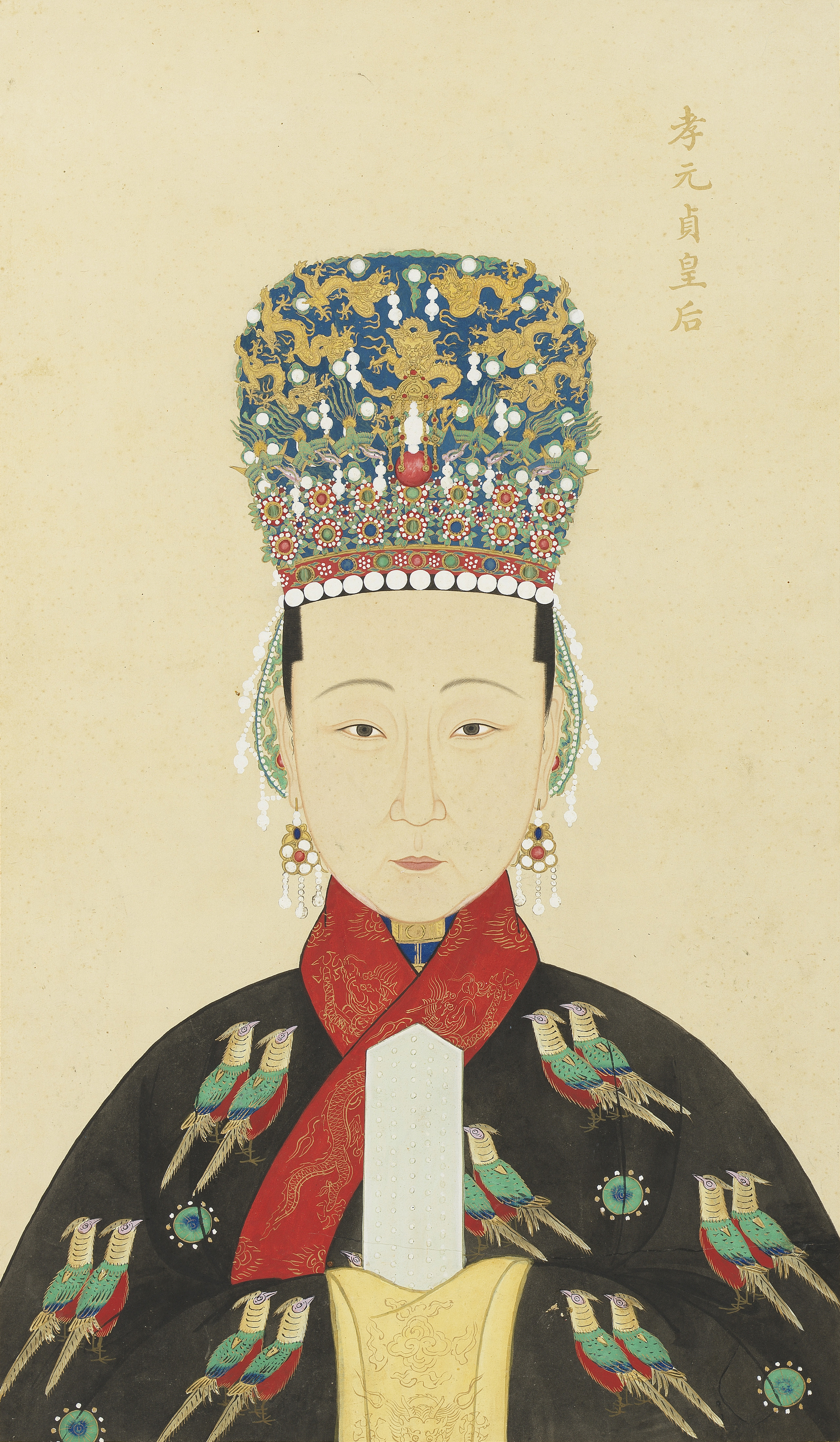

Crown Princess of the Ming Dynasty
- Reign: 1601-1613
- Born: 1580; Shuntian
- Died: 1613 (aged 32–33)
- Burial: Qing Mausoleum
- Spouse: Taichang Emperor (m. 1601)
- Issue: Zhu Huijian, Princess Huaishu
Posthumous name
- Crown Princess Gōngjìng (恭靖太子妃) (conferred in 1615); Empress Xiàoyuán Zhāoyì Zhéhuì Zhuāngrén Hétiān Bìshèng Zhēn (孝元昭懿哲惠莊仁合天弼聖貞皇后) (conferred in 1620)
- Clan: Guo (郭)
- Father: Guo Weicheng (郭維城)

Empress Xiaoyuanzhen (1580–1613), of the Guo clan, was the first wife of the Taichang Emperor when he was crown prince. She died before he ascended the throne, but is more commonly known by her posthumous name.

== Biography ==
Lady Guo was selected as concubine to the crown prince, Zhu Changluo, in 1601.Her father, Guo Weicheng, was enfeoffed as Count of Boping (Chinese: 博平) as a result of her status, and later raised to the rank of marquis. She died in 1613.

== Titles ==
- During the reign of the Wanli Emperor (r. 1572–1620):
  - Lady Guo (郭氏; from 1580)
  - Crown Princess (太子妃; from 1601)
  - Crown Princess Gongjing (恭靖太子妃; from 1613)
- During the reign of the Tianqi Emperor (r. 1621–1627):
  - Empress Xiàoyuán Zhāoyì Zhéhuì Zhuāngrén Hétiān Bìshèng Zhēn (孝元昭懿哲惠莊仁合天弼聖貞皇后; from 1621)

== Issue ==
- As Crown Princess:
  - Princess Daoyi of Huaishu (懷淑悼懿公主; 1604–1610), personal name Huijian (徽娟), the Taichang Emperor's second daughter

== Burial ==
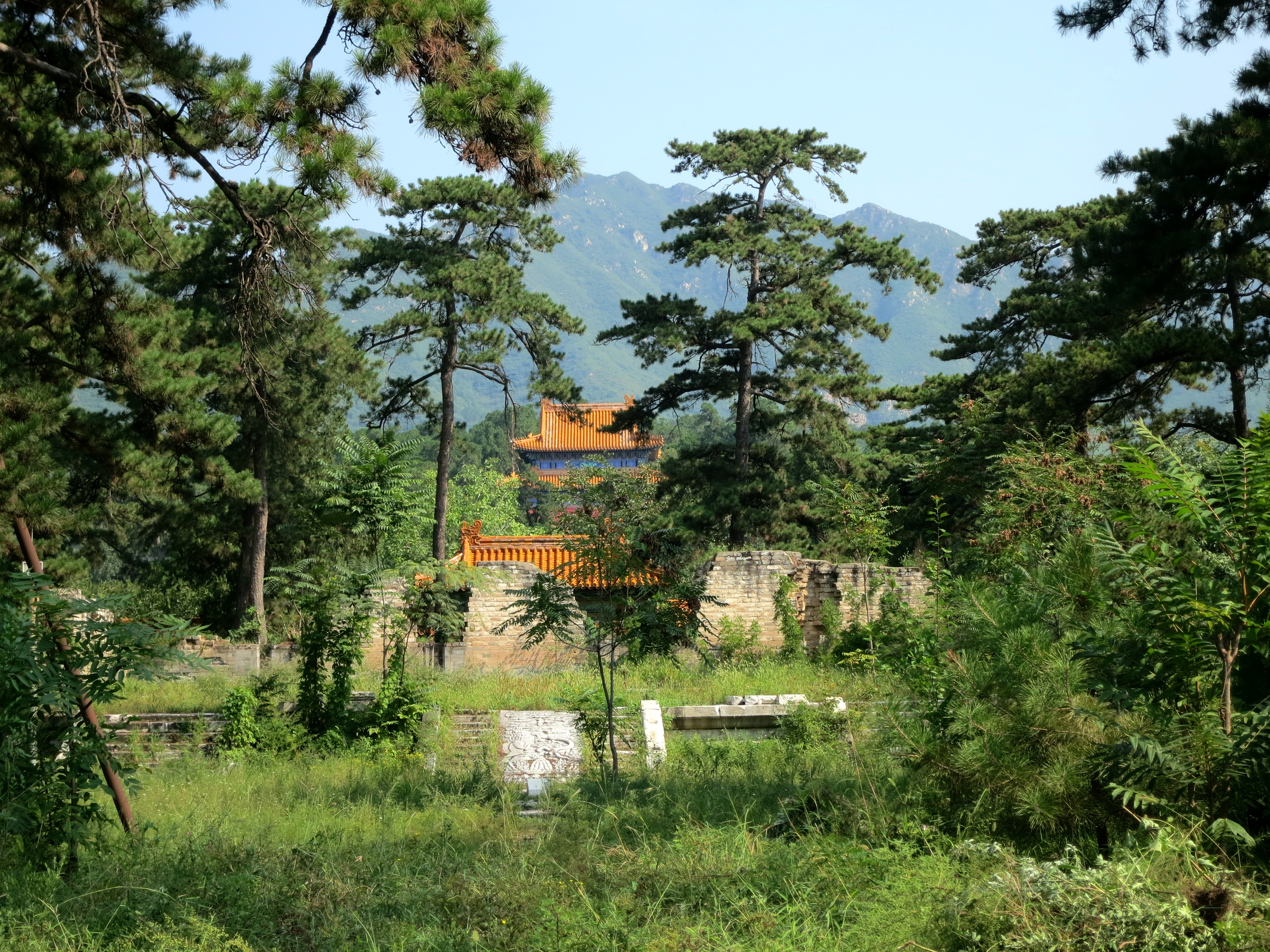
Qingling, Ming tombs, where Empress Xiaoyuanzhen is buried.

Lady Guo died while her husband was still crown prince, and her burial with the accoutrements and rituals of an imperial crown prince's concubine was prevented by her father-in-law, the Wanli Emperor. It was not until an assassination attempt against Zhu Changluo in 1615, allegedly orchestrated by his father's favourite concubine Noble Consort Zheng, that popular opinion forced the emperor to acknowledge his eldest son and grant Lady Guo a proper burial. At this time, she was granted the posthumous name of Crown Princess Gongjing. When the Tianqi Emperor, her husband's son by a concubine, ascended the throne, he granted her the posthumous title of Empress and had her remains moved to the Ming tombs, where she was buried alongside the short-lived Taichang Emperor and included in the family shrine.
