= Foundation of the State Crisis =

Political crisis in Ming China (1586–1614)

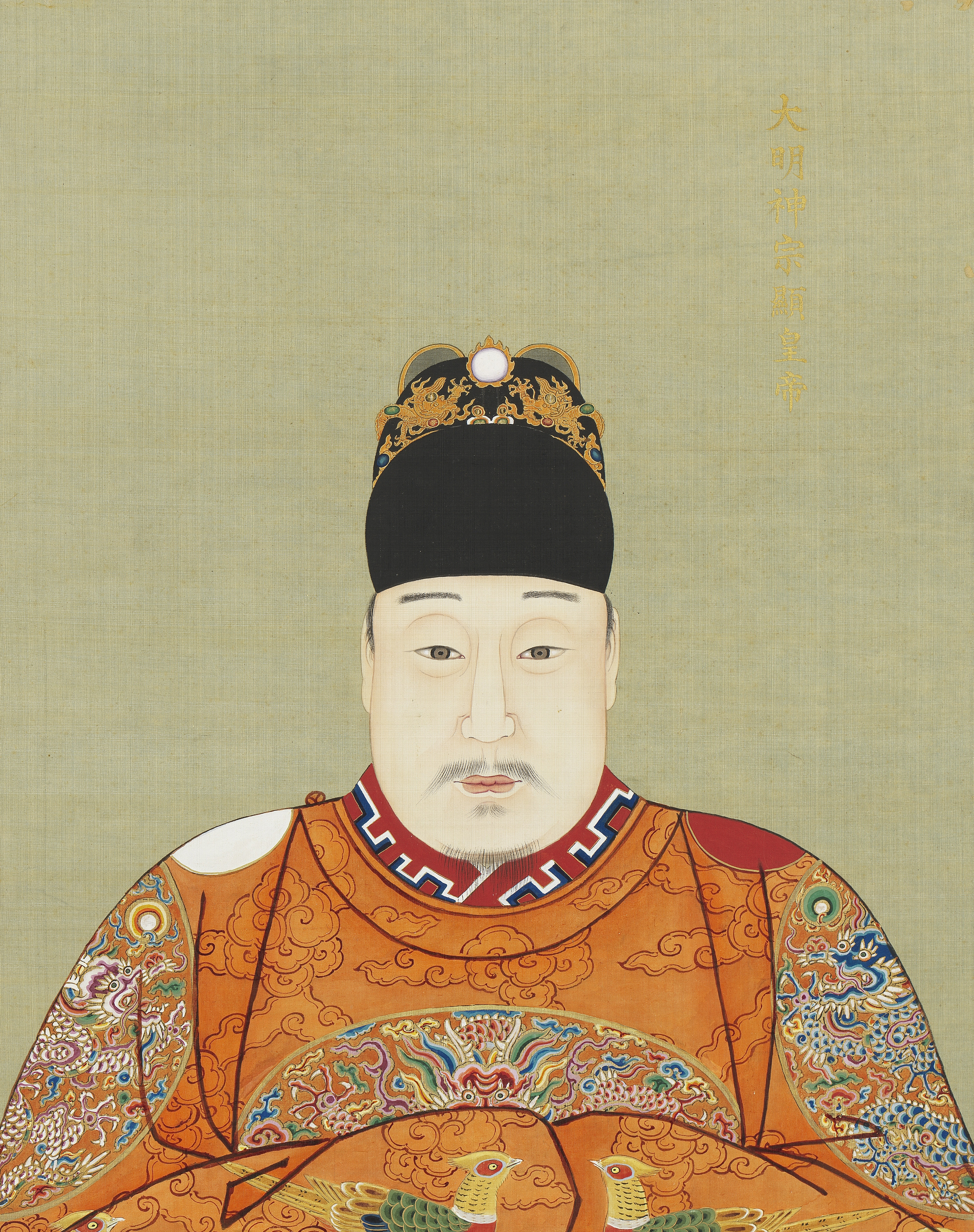
Portrait of the Wanli Emperor

The Foundation of the State Crisis, (Note: Simplified Chinese: 国本之争; traditional Chinese: 國本之爭; pinyin: Guóběn Zhīzhēng, or simplified Chinese: 争国本; traditional Chinese: 爭國本; pinyin: Zhēng Guóběn) (Note: In the political terminology of that time, the heir to the Chinese throne was referred to as the "foundation of the state" (國本).) which took place between 1586 and 1614, was a conflict between the Wanli Emperor, the 14th emperor of China's Ming dynasty, and a large group of bureaucrats. The disagreement centered around the appointment of the heir to the throne. While officials argued for the legal principle of primogeniture and the appointment of the Emperor's eldest son, Zhu Changluo, as heir, the Emperor seemed to favor his third son, Zhu Changxun, born to his favorite concubine Lady Zheng, as his successor. Despite pressure from officials, the Emperor delayed making a decision until 1601, when he finally named Zhu Changluo as his successor and gave Zhu Changxun a princely title. However, the Emperor kept Zhu Changxun in Beijing until 1614, instead of sending him to his regional seat after he reached adulthood. This decision raised suspicions about the Emperor's intentions and sparked further protests from opposition officials. In 1615, disputes over the succession resurfaced in relation to the infamous "case of the attack with the stick", which may have been an assassination attempt on Zhu Changluo.

== Background ==
The stability of a dynasty depended on the proper designation of an heir apparent, as failure to do so could result in a succession crisis. This issue became a defining feature of the Ming dynasty's political climate during the Wanli Emperor's reign (1572–1620). In the Ming dynasty, imperial succession followed the principle of primogeniture. According to the Ancestral Instructions of the Hongwu Emperor, the founder of the dynasty, the throne was to be inherited by the eldest son born to the emperor and empress, or by his direct heir, followed by younger sons of the empress; sons born to concubines were excluded from succession. Conservative officials consistently upheld this rule throughout the Ming period. The Wanli Emperor was the eldest surviving son of the Longqing Emperor, who himself was the firstborn son of the Jiajing Emperor by a concubine. The Wanli Emperor ascended the throne as a child emperor in 1572. Upon reaching adulthood, he faced the politically sensitive task of appointing his own heir, a decision that would later provoke significant debate and unrest within the court, becoming known as the "foundation of the state crisis", or the "foundation of the state controversy".

== Crisis ==
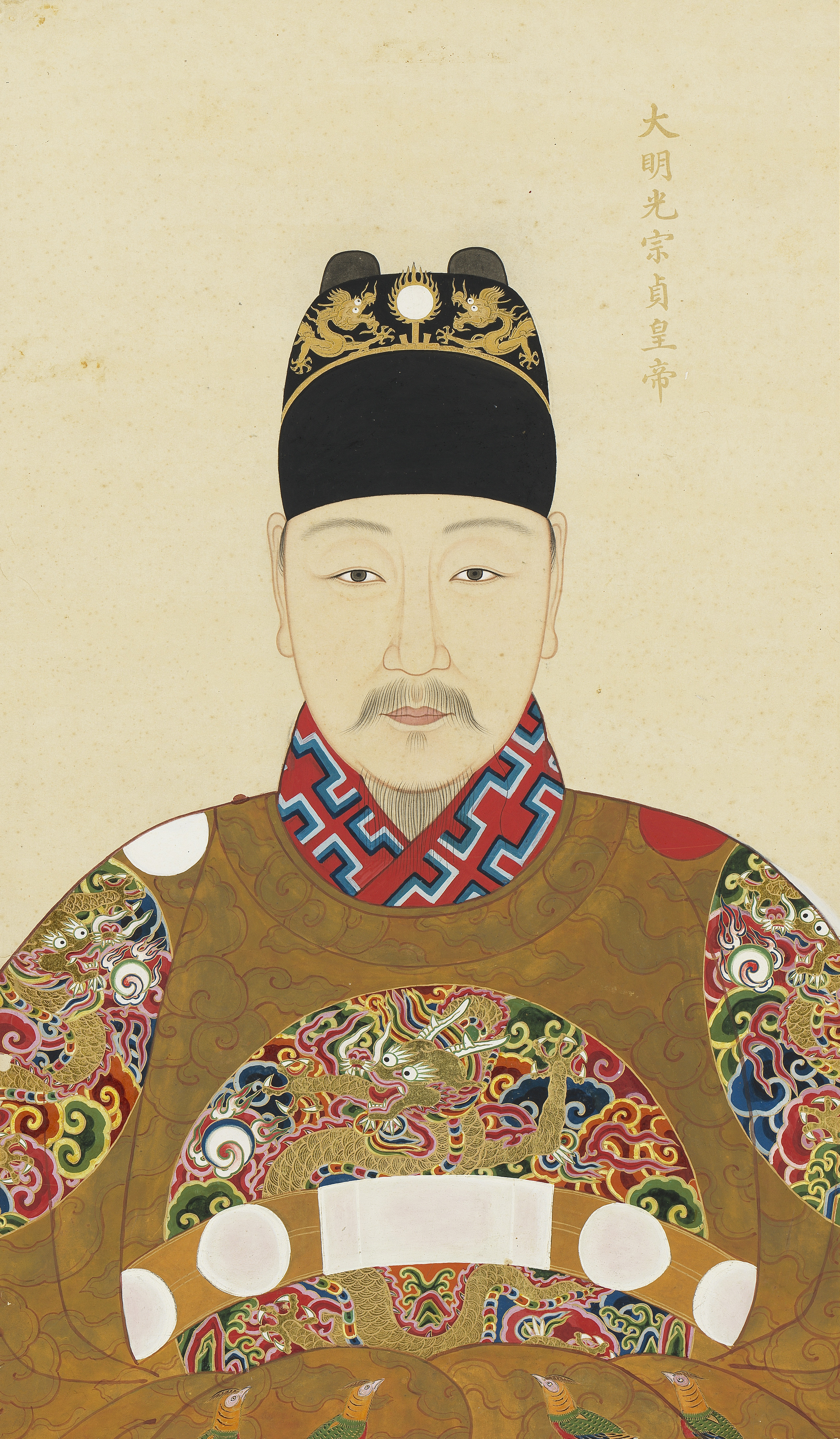
Portrait of Zhu Changluo as the Taichang Emperor. Although he was the eldest son of the Wanli Emperor, his father delayed appointing him as the heir to the throne for many years.

In 1586, the issue of succession arose when the Emperor elevated his favorite concubine, Lady Zheng, to the rank of "Imperial Noble Consort" (Huang Guifei), after they had a son, Zhu Changxun (1586–1641), placing her one step below Empress Wang and above all other concubines, including Lady Wang, the mother of his eldest son Zhu Changluo (1582–1620). This made it clear to those around the Emperor that he preferred Zhu Changxun, his third son, as his successor rather than Zhu Changluo. The bureaucracy then split; some officials began to defend the rights of the first son based on legal primogeniture, while others aligned themselves with the promotion of Lady Zheng's son. The Emperor, despite his autocratic rule, did not possess legislative authority and was limited in his ability to make autonomous decisions. He lacked the power to alter the rules of succession. Widespread support for the rights of the eldest son among officials led him to delay the decision and not appoint either of his sons as his successor.

In 1589, the Emperor agreed to appoint Zhu Changluo as his successor, but Lady Zheng opposed this decision, causing a wave of mutual recriminations and arrests two years later when a pamphlet was circulated in Beijing accusing her of conspiring with high officials against the Emperor's eldest son. In an attempt to improve her public image, the Emperor made efforts to portray Lady Zheng in a favorable light. This reached its peak in 1594 when he ordered all Beijing officials of the fifth rank and above to contribute to her aid efforts for the famine in Henan. The Emperor's justification for postponing the appointment of a successor was that he was waiting for a son from the Empress. This decision sparked protests from high dignitaries, including the grand secretaries Shen Shixing (in office 1578–91) and Wang Xijue (in office 1584–91 and 1593–94). Empress Dowager Li, the Wanli Emperor's mother, also supported Zhu Changluo's succession. When the Emperor objected, stating that his eldest son was the son of a mere palace servant, Empress Dowager Li countered that the Wanli Emperor was also the son of a mere servant. Critics argued that this succession case revealed the Wanli Emperor's inability to fulfill the duties of a monarch. Empress Dowager Li's public and behind-the-scenes support of Lady Wang countered the Emperor's support of Lady Zheng. Additionally, Empress Dowager Li relied on Ming law, which considered the appointment of heir to the throne a family matter, giving her, as the Emperor's mother, the final and decisive say. A loose group formed around Empress Dowager Li, consisting of high-ranking officials, prominent Buddhist monks, rank-and-file officials, and even some eunuchs, all supporting her interests and those of the Emperor's eldest son. The followers of Lady Wang and Zhu Changhuo feared Empress Wang's death, believing that if she died, the Emperor could appoint Lady Zheng as the new empress, making her son the legal successor.

When Zhu Changluo turned eight years old in 1590, officials insisted that the Emperor appoint him as successor so that his education, which typically began at the age of six, could officially commence. To support their argument, they noted that the Wanli Emperor himself had been appointed as successor as a child. The Emperor defended himself by stating that princes were traditionally taught by eunuchs. Despite this, in 1591, the Emperor, under pressure from officials, finally agreed to appoint a successor within two years. The opposition, fearing further delays, demanded that Zhu Changluo's teaching and preparations for his appointment begin immediately. The Emperor was angered at this request and refused to comply.

In the 1590s, Lady Zheng publicly promoted her son as heir to the throne. This was evident in the stelae erected in Beijing's Dongyue Taoist Temple (early 1592) and Sanyang Monastery on Mount Tai (1594 and 1596), which referred to her son as heir (taizi). Empress Wang and Lady Wang also sought supernatural assistance, but through Buddhist practices. For instance, at the beginning of 1592, Empress Wang financially supported the publication of a book of prayers to Guanyin, the most popular bodhisattva among women. Additionally, with the support of Empress Dowager Li, Empress Wang financed the reconstruction of Buddhist monasteries. Steles and inscriptions requesting blessings for the Emperor's first-born son also mentioned Lady Wang.

In 1593, officials were eagerly anticipating whether the monarch would fulfill the promise made in 1591. The Emperor had initially suggested to Grand Secretary Wang Xijue that he appoint his three living sons as princes, in accordance with the law, and wait to see if the Empress would bear a son. Wang drafted the edict and sent it to the Ministry of Rites to begin preparations. The idea faced opposition from critics who argued that the Emperor should appoint his eldest son as his heir, not merely a prince. This forced Wang Xijue to apologize to the Emperor, admitting that the appointment of three princes would go against the law, which he had not previously realized. The Emperor abandoned the idea of appointing his sons as princes and declared that he would not appoint a successor in the next two to three years.

In 1599, on Zhu Changluo's eighteenth birthday, there was a surge of requests for his appointment as heir to the throne. The Emperor demanded that the Ministry of Revenue collect 24 million liang of silver to cover the expenses of the ceremonies for naming the successor and his other sons. This was a blatant obstruction from the Emperor, as the requested amount far exceeded the ministry's annual income in silver and even surpassed the state's annual income in both silver and goods.

It was not until 1601 that the Emperor finally agreed to the appointment, and the Grand Secretariat prepared an edict. However, at the last minute, the Emperor attempted to delay the edict. Despite this, Senior Grand Secretary Shen Yiguan (沈一貫) stood firm and did not back down, and the Emperor ultimately appointed his eldest son as successor and his four younger sons as princes in November 1601. Zhu Changxun was given the title of Prince of Fu, but he remained in Beijing instead of being sent to the province as planned when he turned eighteen in 1604. This fueled rumors that the question of succession was still open. In 1614, after numerous appeals and protests against the prince's inactivity, the Emperor finally sent him to his provincial seat. During one of these protests, Lady Zheng argued that the prince should stay in Beijing to care for Empress Dowager Li and attend her birthday celebrations the following year. The Empress Dowager summoned her younger son, Zhu Yiliu, Prince of Lu, to Beijing. This decision was a challenge to the Emperor, as it was considered inappropriate and risky for the princes to stay in the capital since they could potentially oppose the heir apparent as alternative heirs. The Emperor eventually backed down.

== Case of the attack with the stick ==
In late May 1615, the "case of the attack with the stick" (梃擊案) occurred, when a man named Zhang Chai (張差) was arrested near Zhu Changluo's palace for carrying a stick. The trial officials in the Ministry of Justice later concluded that he was mentally unstable and had intended to use the stick to settle a personal dispute with two palace eunuchs he had encountered outside the city. The case was therefore closed, and Zhang was sentenced to execution. The prison official Wang Zhicai (王之寀) disputed that conclusion and successfully called for a public investigation involving representatives from all offices of the Ministry of Justice. The reopened investigation found that Zhang was mentally sound and had been hired by two eunuchs close to Lady Zheng and her brother. This raised suspicions that their intention was to assassinate the heir and replace him with Lady Zheng's son. The case caused a stir at court and the Wanli Emperor took the unprecedented step of summoning civil and military officials from Beijing. He appeared before them, which was his first meeting with "outer court" officials since 1602. Zhu Changluo and his children accompanied the Emperor. The Emperor expressed his anger towards the officials for doubting his relationship with the heir, whom he trusted and relied on. Zhu Changluo confirmed his close bond with his father and requested an end to the entire affair. In addition, the Emperor ordered the execution of Zhang Chai and the two eunuchs involved in the case, but representatives from the Ministry of Justice opposed the execution and demanded further investigation. The grand secretaries intervened and brokered a compromise—Zhang was executed the following day, while the suspected eunuchs were to be interrogated. The interrogation took place, but both suspects remained under the watch of the Emperor's eunuchs. On the fifth day after the Emperor's speech, the officials were informed that the two eunuchs had died under palace confinement.
