= Li Pu =

Li Pu (李普) (824 – July 16, 828), formally Crown Prince Daohuai (悼懷太子), was an imperial prince of the Chinese Tang dynasty. He was the oldest son of Emperor Jingzong.

Li Pu was born in 824, around the time when his father Emperor Jingzong had just taken the throne, and he was Emperor Jingzong's oldest son. His mother was Consort Guo, who then carried the title of Cairen (才人) but was given the greater title of Guifei (貴妃) after he was born. Li Pu was created the Prince of Jin the same year he was born.

Around new year 827, Emperor Jingzong was assassinated, and Emperor Jingzong's younger brother Li Ang the Prince of Jiang became emperor (as Emperor Wenzong). Emperor Wenzong favored Li Pu greatly because he saw Li Pu as careful and obedient. He also wanted to have Li Pu serve as his heir. Li Pu died in 828, however, and Emperor Wenzong was greatly saddened, such that even after he had a son (Li Yong) he did not create Li Yong crown prince until 832. He posthumously honored Li Pu as a crown prince.

== Notes and references ==
- Old Book of Tang, vol. 175.
- New Book of Tang, vol. 82.
- Zizhi Tongjian, vol. 243.
