= Empress Dowager Xiaohe =

Chinese empress dowager (1582–1619)

Empress Dowager Xiaohe 孝和皇太后
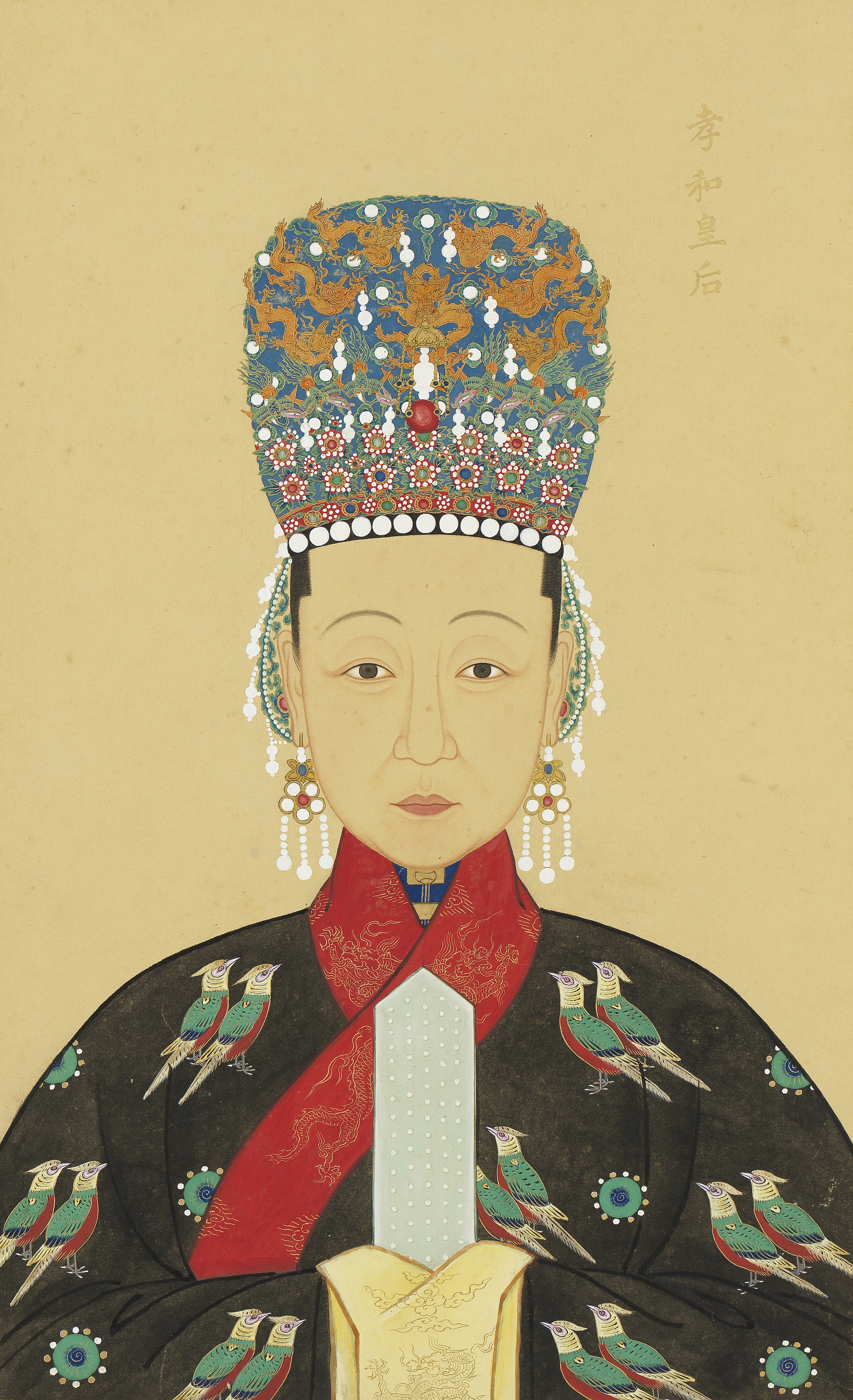
- Born: 1582; Shuntian Prefecture
- Died: 1619 (age 37–48); Forbidden City, Beijing
- Burial: Qing Mausoleum
- Spouse: Taichang Emperor
- Issue: Tianqi Emperor; Prince Jianhuai
Posthumous name
- Empress Dowager Xiaohe Gongxian Wenmu Huici Xietian Sheng (孝和恭獻溫穆徽慈諧天鞠聖皇太后)
- Clan: Wang (王)

Empress Dowager Xiaohe (孝和皇太后; 1582 – 1619), of the Wang clan, was a Ming dynasty consort of the Taichang Emperor and the biological mother of the Tianqi Emperor.

== Biography ==
Lady Wang became a concubine of the Taichang Emperor Zhu Changluo when he was the crown prince. She was chosen to be a concubine of Zhu Changluo with the rank of Lady of Selected Service (Chinese: 選侍; Pinyin: xuǎn shì), a third rank Consort of the Crown Prince.

In December 1605, Lady Wang gave birth to Zhu Changluo's first son who would become the Tianqi Emperor. Lady Wang was promoted to the rank of Talented Lady. In 1607, she gave birth to another son who lived only until 1610.

When Tianqi Emperor's half-brother Zhu Youjian became emperor, he posthumously awarded her with title of Empress Dowager Xiaohe Gongxian Wenmu Huici Xietian Sheng and moved her tomb to Qingling to be buried alongside her husband.

== Titles ==
- During the reign of the Wanli Emperor (r. 1572–1620):
  - Lady Wang (王氏; from 1582)
  - Lady of Selected Service (選侍)
  - Talented Lady (才人; from 1604)
- During the reign of the Tianqi Emperor (r.1620–1627):
  - Empress Dowager Xiaohe Gongxian Wenmu Huici Xietian Jusheng' (孝和恭獻溫穆徽慈諧天鞠聖皇太后; from 1621)

== Issue ==
- As Lady of Selected Service:
  - Zhu Youjiao, the Tianqi Emperor (熹宗 朱由校; 23 December 1605 – 30 September 1627), the Taichang Emperor's first son
- As Talented Lady:
  - Zhu Youxue, Prince Jianhuai (簡懷王 朱由㰒; 1607–1610), the Taichang Emperor's second son
