= Consort Guo (Jingzong) =

Consort Guo, imperial consort rank Guifei (郭貴妃), was an imperial consort of the Chinese Tang dynasty. She was the favorite concubine of Emperor Jingzong (Li Zhan).

== As consort to Emperor Jingzong ==
It is not known when Consort Guo was born. Her father was the imperial guard general Guo Yi (郭義), whose geographical origin was lost to history. Toward the end of the Changqing era of Emperor Muzong (821–824), on account of her beauty, she was selected to be a consort to Emperor Muzong's son and Crown Prince Li Zhan. After Li Zhan became emperor in 824, she was given the imperial consort rank of Cairen (才人).

Also in 824, Consort Guo gave birth to Li Zhan's oldest son Li Pu, who was created the Prince of Jin. Because of this, and because she was both beautiful and virtuous, Emperor Jingzong loved her greatly. In 826, he created her Guifei — the highest possible rank for an imperial consort. He also posthumously honored her father Guo Yi and gave an official title to her brother Guo Huan (郭環) and awarded Guo Huan a mansion.

== After Emperor Jingzong's death ==
Around new year 827, Emperor Jingzong was assassinated. He was succeeded by his younger brother Emperor Wenzong. Emperor Wenzong loved Li Pu greatly and treated Li Pu as his own son, and it was said that on account of this, Consort Guo continued to receive great respect in the palace. After Li Pu died in 828, Emperor Wenzong posthumously honored him as crown prince. That was the last recorded event involving Consort Guo in traditional histories, and it is not known when she died.

== Notes and references ==
- Old Book of Tang, vol. 51.
- New Book of Tang, vol. 77.
