= Tianqi Emperor =

Emperor of China from 1620 to 1627

Tianqi Emperor 天啓帝
- Palace portrait on a hanging scroll

Emperor of the Ming dynasty
- Reign: 1 October 1620 – 30 September 1627
- Enthronement: 1 October 1620
- Predecessor: Taichang Emperor
- Successor: Chongzhen Emperor
- Born: 23 December 1605
- Died: 30 September 1627 (aged 21); Palace of Heavenly Purity, Forbidden City, Ming dynasty
- Burial: De Mausoleum, Ming tombs, Beijing
- Spouse: Empress Xiao'aizhe (m. 1621)
Era dates
- Tianqi: (Note: Simplified Chinese: 天启; traditional Chinese: 天啓; pinyin: Tiānqǐ) 22 January 1621 – 4 February 1628
Posthumous name
- Emperor Datian Chandao Dunxiao Duyou Zhangwen Xiangwu Jingmu Zhuangqin Zhe (Note: Simplified Chinese: 达天阐道敦孝笃友章文襄武靖穆庄勤悊皇帝; traditional Chinese: 達天闡道敦孝篤友章文襄武靖穆莊勤悊皇帝 (conferred by the Chongzhen Emperor in 1627)) (Note: The Chongzhen changbian notes that the original posthumous name of the Tianqi Emperor included the character "哲" (zhé, meaning "wisdom"), which was later changed by the Chongzhen Emperor to "悊" (zhé, meaning "reverence" or "caution"). According to Shuowen Jiezi, "悊" is an variant form of "哲" with a semantic emphasis on "heart/mind" (心). This alteration reflects the Chongzhen Emperor's intentional shift in emphasizing reverence over wisdom in the evaluation of his predecessor's legacy.)
Temple name
- Xizong (Note: Chinese: 熹宗; pinyin: Xīzōng)
- House: Zhu
- Dynasty: Ming
- Father: Taichang Emperor
- Mother: Empress Dowager Xiaohe

Chinese name
- Traditional Chinese: 天啓帝
- Simplified Chinese: 天启帝
Transcriptions
Standard Mandarin
- Hanyu Pinyin: Tiānqǐ Dì

The Tianqi Emperor (23 December 1605 – 30 September 1627), personal name Zhu Youjiao, (Note: Chinese: 朱由校; pinyin: Zhū Yóujiào) was the 16th and penultimate emperor of the Ming dynasty of China, reigning from 1620 to 1627. He succeeded his father, the Taichang Emperor.

Zhu Youjiao ascended the throne at the age of fifteen, following the sudden death of his father, who had ruled for only one month. The era name of his reign was Tianqi, which means "heavenly opening". Instead of taking an active role in state affairs and pursuing his father's political objectives, the Tianqi Emperor showed little interest and neglected his duties.

He may have suffered from learning disabilities and was illiterate, which hindered his ability to read important documents and understand government matters. As a result, the head of the imperial eunuchs, Wei Zhongxian, took advantage of the situation and seized executive power, along with the emperor's former wet nurse, Madam Ke. While Wei placed his supporters in influential positions in the palace, Madam Ke used her influence to isolate and starve other women in the imperial harem, in order to maintain her own power.

The conservative Confucian moralists of the Donglin movement were dissatisfied with this style of governance and expressed their discontent. In response, the government resorted to harsh repression, resulting in the execution of many officials. This oppressive rule led to worsening conditions for the population during the reign of the Tianqi Emperor, and several popular uprisings had to be confronted by the authorities.

The Tianqi Emperor died in 1627 and was succeeded by his younger brother, Zhu Youjian, who became known as the Chongzhen Emperor.

== Family ==
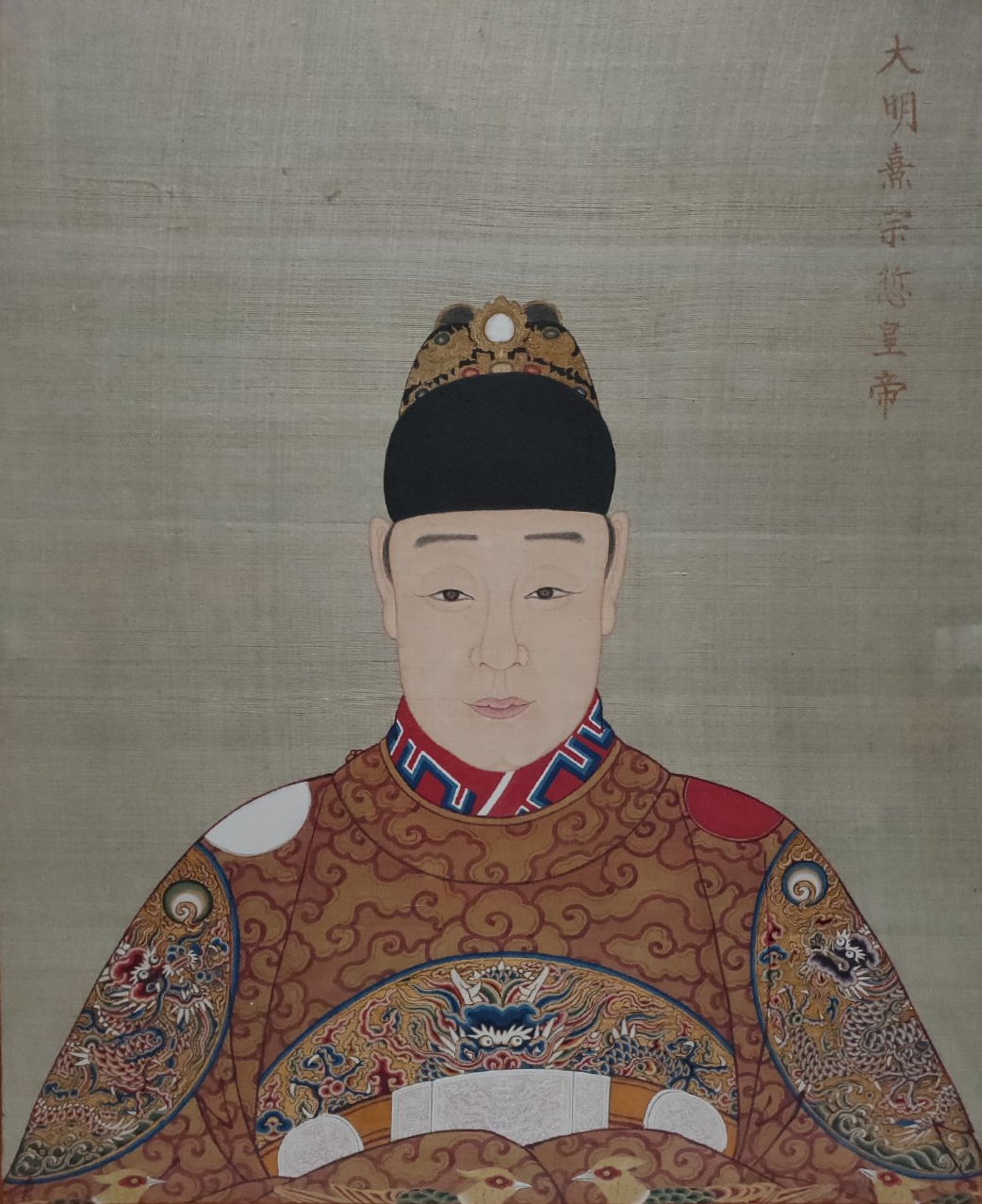
Portrait of Xizong, Emperor Zhe in The Palace Museum

- Empress Xiao'aizhe, of the Zhang clan (孝哀悊皇后 張氏; 1610–1644), personal name Yan (嫣)
  - Zhu Ciran, Crown Prince Huaichong (懷衝皇太子 朱慈燃; 4 November 1623), first son
- Consort Hui, of the Fan clan (慧妃 范氏), later Imperial Noble Consort
  - Princess Yongning (永寧公主; 1622–1624), personal name Shu'e (淑娥), first daughter
  - Zhu Ciyu, Crown Prince Daohuai (悼懷皇太子 朱慈焴; 1623–1624), second son
- Consort Rong, of the Ren clan (容妃 任氏), later Imperial Noble Consort
  - Zhu Cijiong, Crown Prince Xianhuai (獻懷皇太子 朱慈炅; 31 October 1625 – 30 May 1626), third son, died during the Wanggongchang Explosion
- Consort Gonghuichun, of the Duan clan (恭惠純妃 段氏; 10 May 1607 – 3 July 1629)
- Consort Cheng, of the Li clan (成妃 李氏; 1605 – 21 December 1637)
  - Princess Huaining (懷寧公主; 1624), personal name Shumo (淑嫫), second daughter
- Consort Daoshunyu, of the Zhang clan (悼順裕妃 張氏; 22 August 1606 – 16 September 1623)
- Consort Liang, of the Wang clan (良妃 王氏)
- Noble Lady, of the Feng clan (貴人 馮氏)
- Noble Lady, of the Hu clan (貴人 胡氏; d. 1623)

== See also ==
- Family tree of Chinese monarchs (late)

== Notes ==
Tianqi Emperor House of Zhu Born: 23 December 1605 Died: 30 September 1627
Regnal titles
Preceded by Taichang Emperor	Emperor of the Ming dynasty 1 October 1620 – 30 September 1627	Succeeded by Chongzhen Emperor
