= Military of the Qing dynasty =

- Flag of the Qing dynasty (1889–1912)

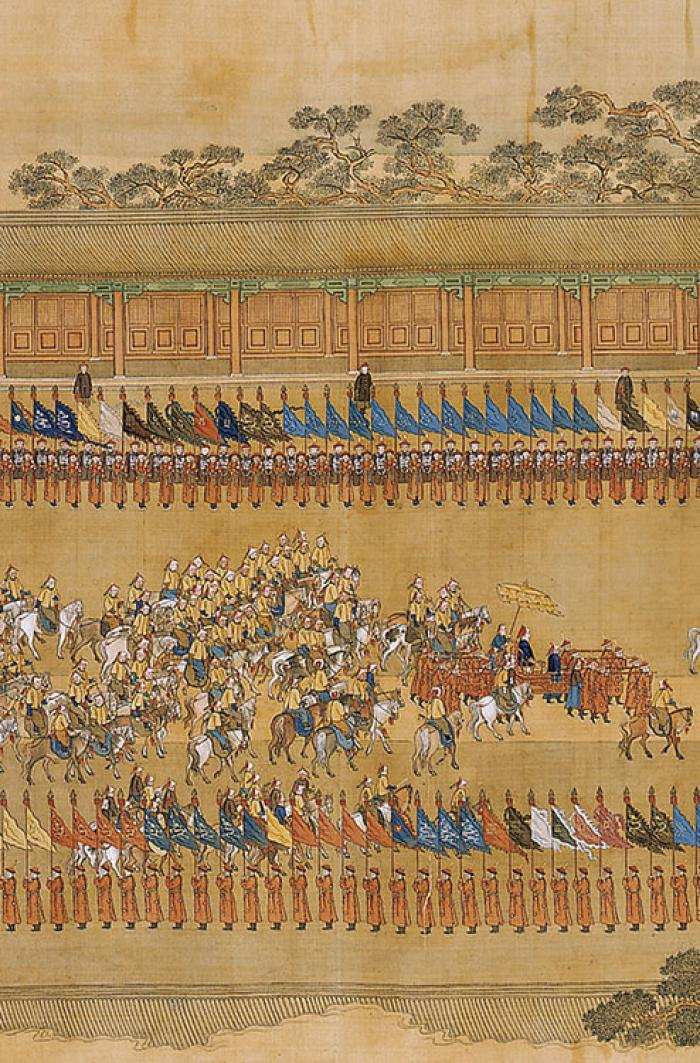
- The Qianlong Emperor's Southern Inspection Tour, Scroll Twelve: Return to the Palace (detail), 1764–1770, by Xu Yang
- Founded: c. 1644
- Disbanded: c. 1912
- Service branches: Eight Banners; Green Standard Army; New Army; Navy

Leadership
- Commander-in-Chief: Emperor of China
- Minister of the Army: Wang Shizhen (last)
- Minister of the Navy: Sa Zhenbing (last)

Personnel
- Conscription: No
- Active personnel: 800,000 personnel

Related articles
- Ranks: Military ranks of the Qing dynasty

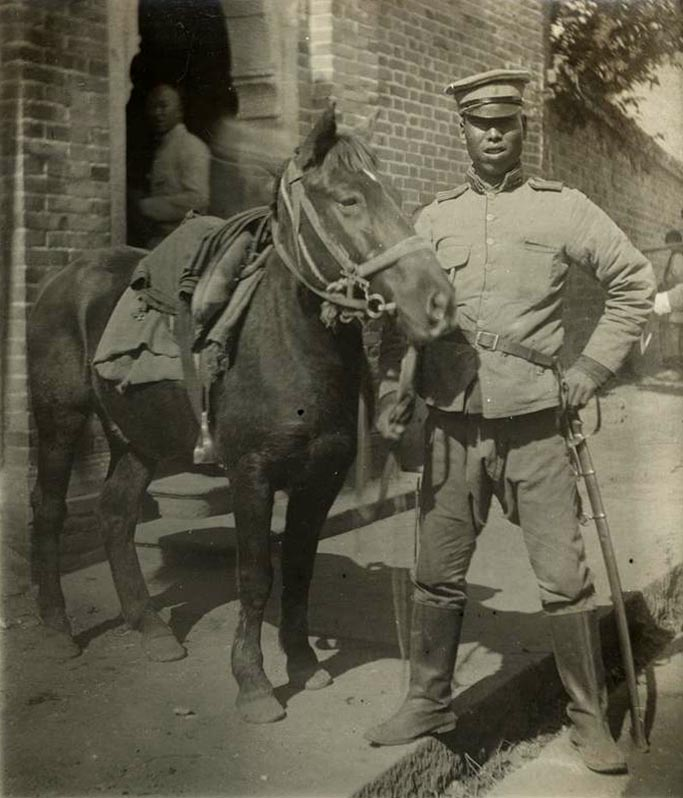
Qing cavalry in the 1900s.

The Qing dynasty (1644–1912) was established by conquest and maintained by forces. The founding emperors personally organized and led the armies, and the continued cultural and political legitimacy of the dynasty depended on their ability to defend the country from invasion and expand its territory. Military institutions, leadership, and finance were fundamental to the dynasty's initial success and ultimate decay. The early military system centered on the Eight Banners, a hybrid institution that also played social, economic, and political roles.

The use of gunpowder during the High Qing can compete with the three gunpowder empires in western Asia. However, the military technology of the European Industrial Revolution made China's armament and military rapidly obsolete. By the middle of the 18th century, the military of the Qing dynasty numbered over 200,000 bannermen and 600,067 Green Standard troops.

The Qing navy became the largest in East Asia, but its organization and logistics were inadequate, officer training was deficient, and corruption widespread. The Beiyang Fleet was virtually destroyed and the modernized ground forces defeated in the 1895 First Sino-Japanese War. The Qing created a few semi-modernized units, but could not prevent the Eight Nation Alliance from invading China to put down the Boxer Uprising in 1900. A national effort to create a Western-style regular army, the New Army, began in 1901, which included 16 divisions as of 1911. The revolt of a New Army unit in 1911 led to the fall of the dynasty.

== History ==
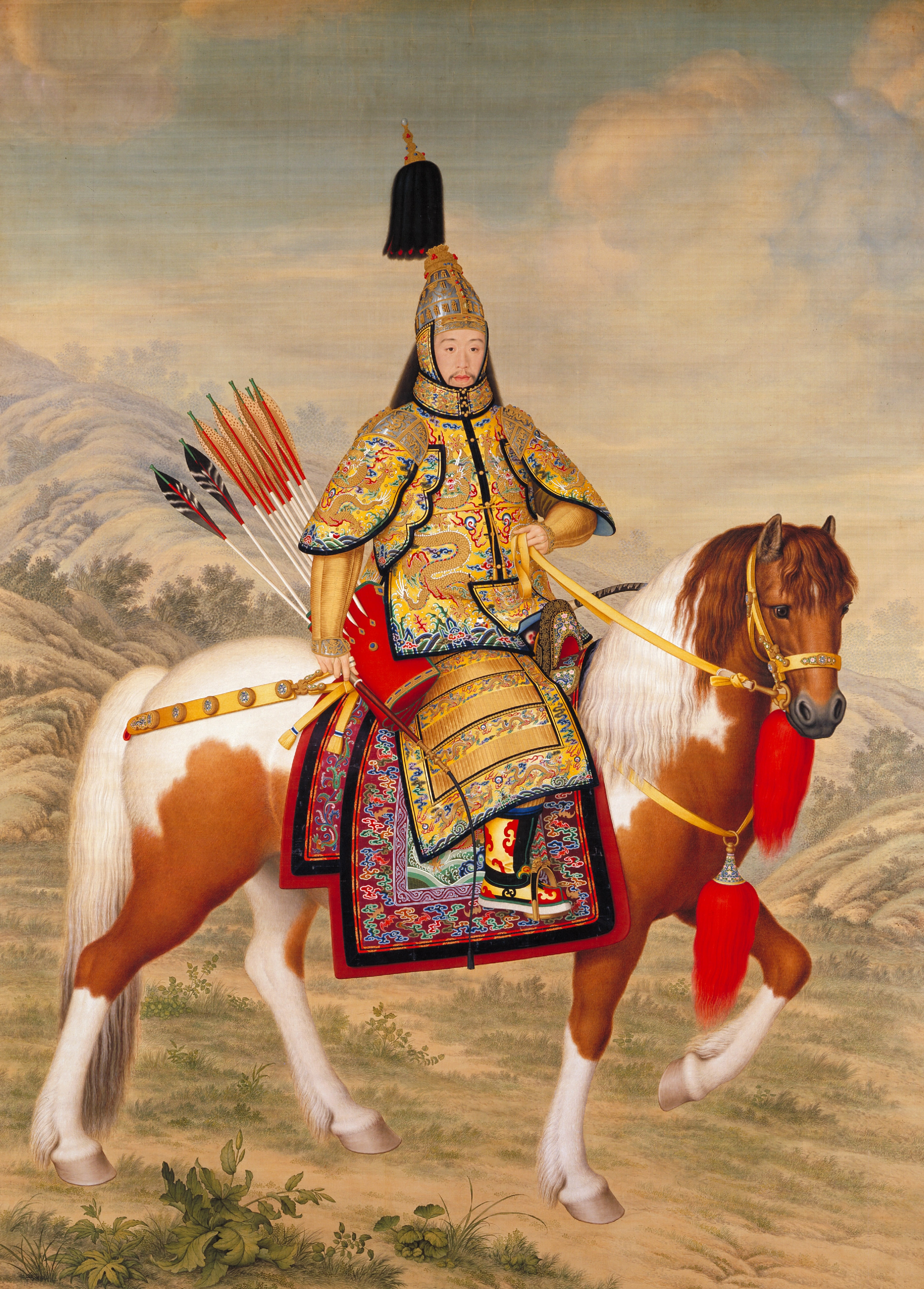
The Qianlong Emperor in ceremonial armour on horseback, by Giuseppe Castiglione.

The Banner system was developed on an informal basis as early as 1601, and formally established in 1615 by the Jurchen chieftain Nurhaci (1559–1626), the retrospectively recognized founder of Great Qing. His son Hong Taiji (1592–1643), who renamed the Jurchens "Manchus", created eight Mongol banners to mirror the Manchu ones and eight "Han-martial" (漢軍; Hànjūn) banners manned by Han troops who surrendered to the Qing Empire before the full-fledged conquest of China proper began in 1644. After 1644, the Ming troops that surrendered to the Qing Empire were integrated into the Green Standard Army, a corps that eventually outnumbered the Banners by three to one.

After the Qing Empire captured Beijing in 1644 and rapidly gained control of large tracts of former Ming territory, the relatively small Banner armies were further augmented by remnants of Ming forces that surrendered to the Qing Empire. Some of these troops were first accepted into the Chinese-martial banners, but after 1645 they were integrated a new military unit called the Green Standard Army, named after the color of their battle pennants. Even though the Manchu banners were the most effective fighting force during the Qing conquest of the Ming, most of the fighting was done by Chinese banners and Green Standard troops, especially in southern China where Manchu cavalry could play less of a role. The banners also performed badly during the revolt of the Three Feudatories that erupted in southern China in 1673. It was regular Chinese troops, albeit led by Manchu and Chinese officers, who helped the Qing Empire to defeat their enemies in 1681 and thus consolidate their control over all of China. Green Standard troops also formed the main personnel of the naval forces that defeated the Southern Ming dynasty resistance in Taiwan.

Manchu imperial princes led the Banners in defeating the Ming armies, but after lasting peace was established starting in 1683, both the Banners and the Green Standard Armies started to lose their efficiency. The Qing Emperor thought that Han Chinese were superior at battling other Han people and so used the Green Standard Army as the dominant and majority army for crushing the rebels, instead of bannermen. In northwestern China against Wang Fuchen, the Qing Empire put bannermen in the rear as reserves while they used Han Chinese Green Standard Army soldiers and Han Chinese generals like Zhang Liangdong, Wang Jinbao, and Zhang Yong as the primary military forces, considering Han troops as better at fighting other Han people, and these Han generals achieved victory over the rebels. Sichuan and southern Shaanxi were retaken by the Han Chinese Green Standard Army under Wang Jinbao and Zhao Liangdong in 1680, with Manchus only participating in dealing with logistics and provisions. 400,000 Green Standard Army soldiers and 150,000 Bannermen served on the Qing side during the war. 213 Han Chinese Banner companies, and 527 companies of Mongol and Manchu Banners were mobilized by the Qing Empire during the revolt. The Qing Empire had the support of the majority of Han Chinese soldiers and Han elite against the Three Feudatories, since they refused to join Wu Sangui in the revolt, while the Eight Banners and Manchu officers fared poorly against Wu Sangui, so the Qing Empire responded with using a massive army of more than 900,000 Han Chinese (non-Banner) instead of the Eight Banners, to fight and crush the Three Feudatories. Wu Sangui's forces were crushed by the Green Standard Army, made out of defected Ming soldiers.

The frontier in the south-west was extended slowly. In 1701, the Qing Empire defeated the Tibetans at the Battle of Dartsedo. The Dzungar Khanate conquered the Uyghurs in the Dzungar conquest of Altishahr and seized control of Tibet. Han Chinese Green Standard Army soldiers and Manchu bannermen were commanded by the Han Chinese General Yue Zhongqi in the Chinese expedition to Tibet in 1720 which expelled the Dzungars from Tibet and placed it under the Qing rule. At multiple places such as Lhasa, Batang, Dartsendo, Lhari, Chamdo, and Litang, Green Standard troops were garrisoned throughout the Dzungar war. Green Standard Army troops and Manchu bannermen were both part of the Qing force who fought in Tibet in the war against the Dzungars. It was said that the Sichuan commander Yue Zhongqi (a descendant of Yue Fei) entered Lhasa first when the 2,000 Green Standard soldiers and 1,000 Manchu soldiers of the "Sichuan route" seized Lhasa. According to Mark C. Elliott, after 1728, the Qing Empire used Green Standard Army troops to man the garrison in Lhasa rather than bannermen. According to Evelyn S. Rawski both Green Standard Army and bannermen made up the Qing garrison in Tibet. According to Sabine Dabringhaus, Green Standard Chinese soldiers numbering more than 1,300 were stationed by the Qing Empire in Tibet to support the 3,000 strong Tibetan army. Garrisoned in cities, soldiers had few occasions to drill. The Qing Empire nonetheless used superior armament and logistics to expand deeply into Inner Asia, defeat the Dzungars in the 1750s, and complete their conquest of Xinjiang. Despite the dynasty's pride in the Ten Great Campaigns of the Qianlong Emperor (r. 1735–1796), the Qing military became largely ineffective by the end of the 18th century. In particular, their Burmese and Vietnmese campaigns, while achieving the Qing's political objective of nominally gaining submissive tributaries, they were essentially military defeats.

It took almost ten years and huge financial waste to defeat the badly equipped White Lotus Rebellion (1795–1804), partly by legitimizing militias led by local Han elites. The Taiping Rebellion (1850–1864), a large-scale uprising that started in southern China, marched to within miles of Beijing in 1853. The Qing court was forced to let its Han governors-general, first led by Zeng Guofan, raise regional armies. This new type of army and leadership defeated the rebels but signaled the end of Manchu dominance of the military establishment.

=== Nineteenth century ===
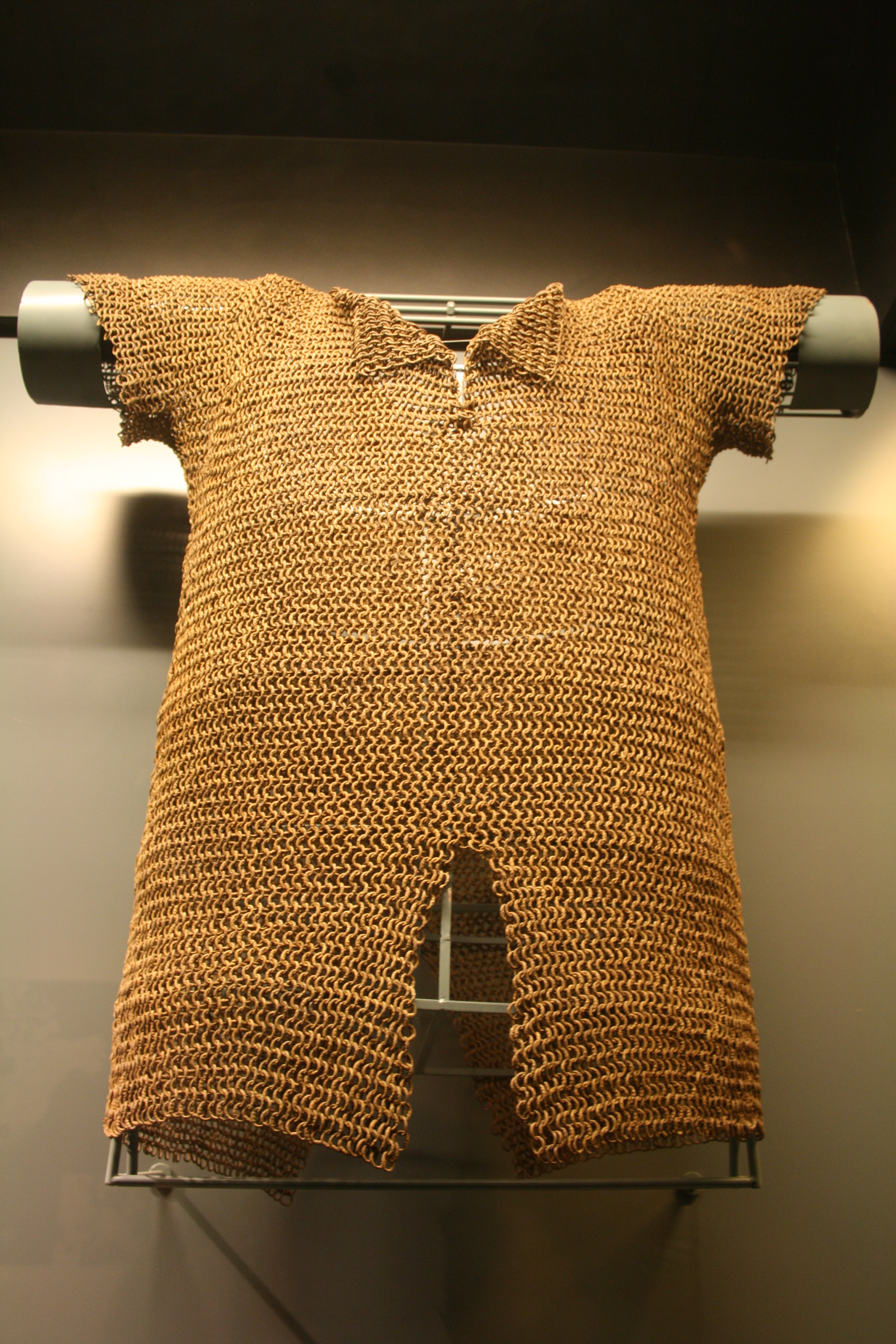
Mail armour, Qing dynasty

Early during the Taiping Rebellion, the Qing forces suffered a series of disastrous defeats culminating in the loss of the regional capital city of Nanjing in 1853. The rebels massacred the entire Manchu garrison and their families in the city and made it their capital. Shortly thereafter, a Taiping expeditionary force penetrated as far north as the suburbs of Tianjin in what was considered the imperial heartlands. In desperation the Qing court ordered a Chinese mandarin, Zeng Guofan, to organize regional (simplified Chinese: 团勇; traditional Chinese: 團勇; pinyin: tuányǒng) and village (simplified Chinese: 乡勇; traditional Chinese: 鄉勇; pinyin: xiāngyǒng) militias into a standing army called tuanlian to contain the rebellion. Zeng Guofan's strategy was to rely on local gentries to raise a new type of military organization from those provinces that the Taiping rebels directly threatened. This new force became known as the Xiang Army, named after the Hunan region where it was raised. The Xiang Army was a hybrid of local militia and a standing army. It was given professional training, but was paid for out of regional coffers and funds its commanders — mostly members of the Chinese gentry — could muster. The Xiang Army and its successor, the Huai Army, created by Zeng Guofan's colleague and student Li Hongzhang, were collectively called the "Yong Ying" (Brave Camp).

Before forming and commanding the Xiang Army, Zeng Guofan had no military experience. Being a classically educated Mandarin, his blueprint for the Xiang Army was taken from a historical source — the Ming general Qi Jiguang, who, because of the weakness of regular Ming troops, had decided to form his own "private" army to repel raiding Japanese pirates in the mid-16th century. Qi Jiguang's doctrine was based on Neo-Confucian ideas of binding troops' loyalty to their immediate superiors and also to the regions in which they were raised. This initially gave the troops an excellent esprit de corps. Qi Jiguang's army was an ad hoc solution to the specific problem of combating pirates, as was Zeng Guofan's original intention for the Xiang Army, which was raise to eradicate the Taiping rebels. However, circumstances led to the Yongying system becoming a permanent institution within the Qing military, which in the long run created problems of its own for the beleaguered central government.

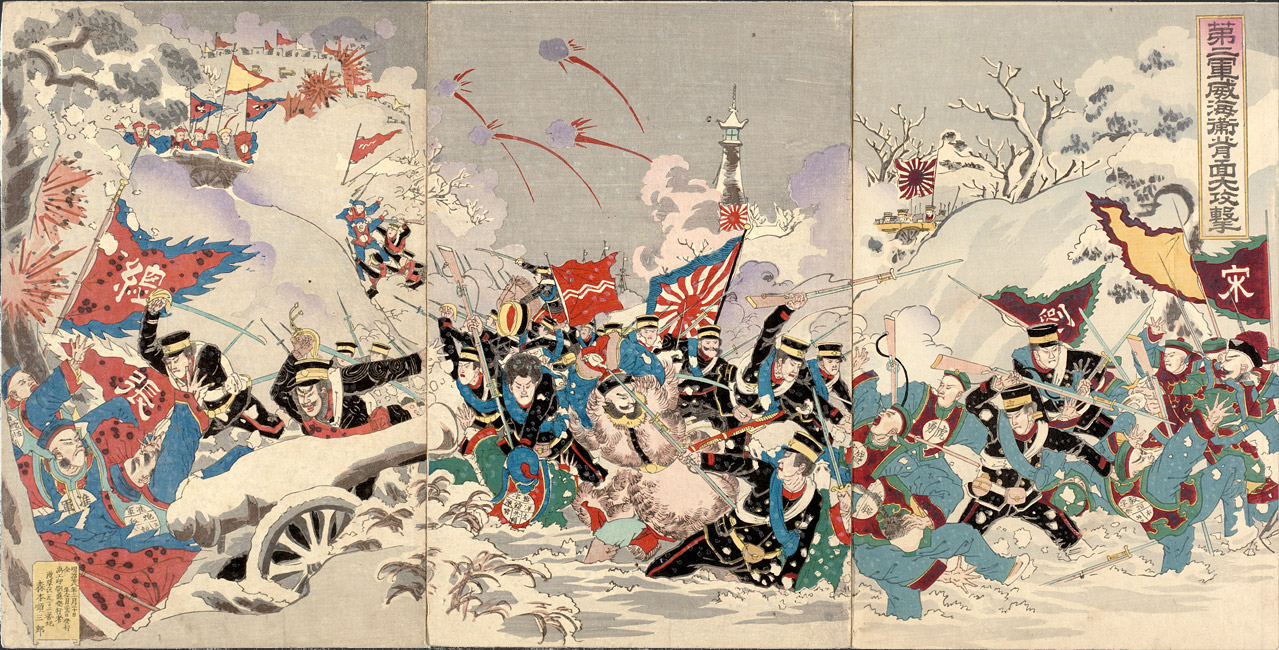
In 1894–1895, fighting over influence in Korea, Japanese troops defeated Qing forces.

First, the Yongying system signaled the end of Manchu dominance in the Qing military establishment. Although the Banners and Green Standard armies lingered on as parasites depleting resources, henceforth the Yongying corps became the Qing government's de facto first-line troops. Secondly the Yongying corps were financed through provincial coffers and were led by regional commanders. This devolution of power weakened the central government's grip on the whole country, a weakness further aggravated by foreign powers vying to carve up autonomous colonial territories in different parts of the Qing Empire in the later half of the 19th century. Despite these serious negative effects, the measure was deemed necessary as tax revenue from provinces occupied and threatened by rebels had ceased to reach the cash-strapped central government. Finally, the nature of Yongying command structure fostered nepotism and cronyism amongst its commanders, whom, as they ascended the bureaucratic ranks laid the seeds to the Qing Empire's eventual demise and the outbreak of regional warlordism in China during the first half of the 20th century.

The Qing government's decision to turn the banner troops into a professional force whose every welfare and need was met by state coffers brought wealth, and with it corruption, to the rank and file of the Manchu banners and hastened its decline as a fighting force. Bannermen frequently went into debt as a result of drinking, gambling, and spending time at theaters and brothels, leading to a general ban on theater-going within the Eight Banners.

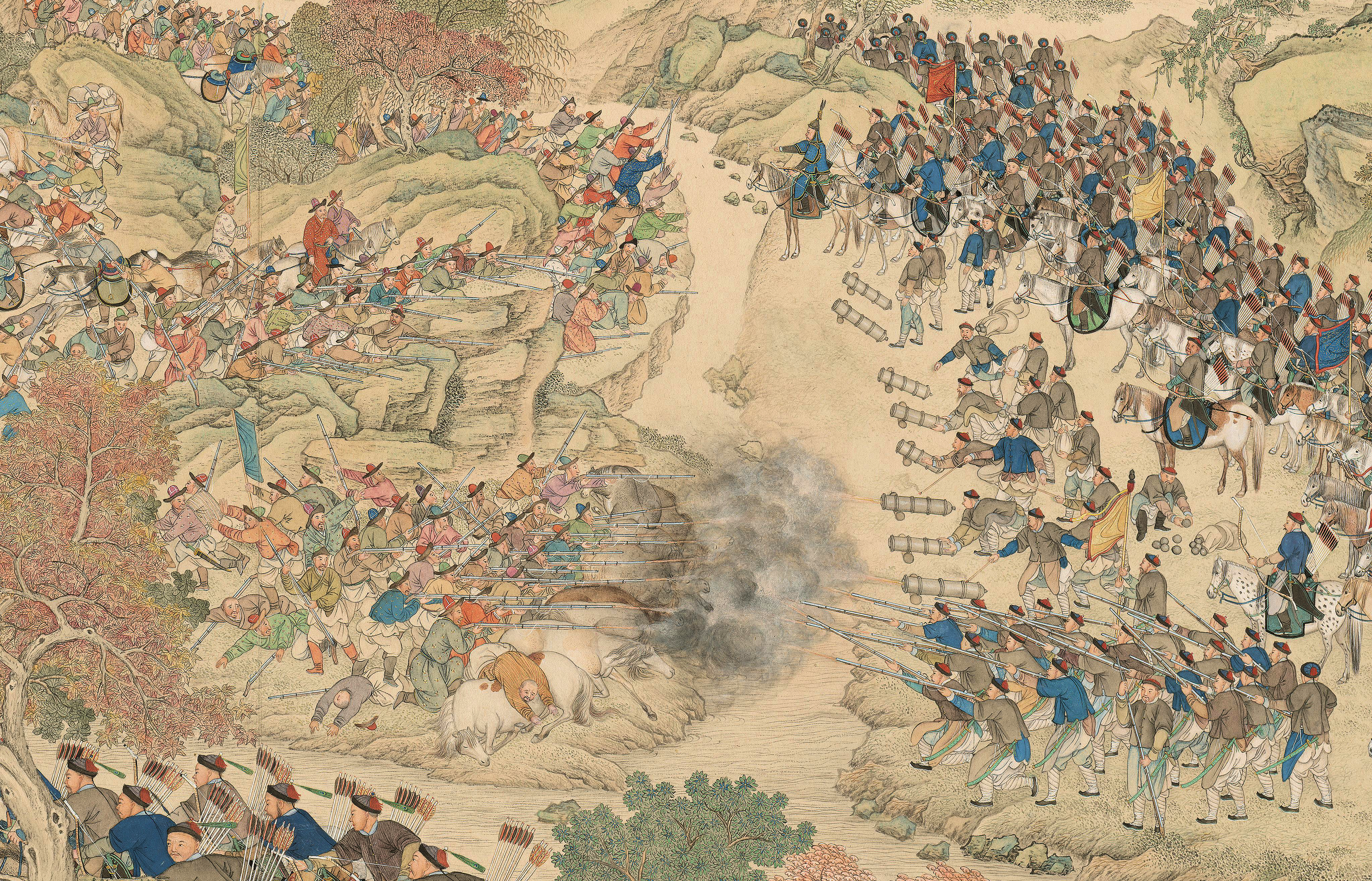
A battle between Qing troops and Uyghur Khojas near Lake Eshilkul in 1759.

At the same time, a similar decline was occurring in the Green Standard Army. In peacetime, soldiering became merely a source of supplementary income. Soldiers and commanders alike neglected training in pursuit of their own economic gains. Corruption was rampant as regional unit commanders submitted pay and supply requisitions based on exaggerated head counts to the quartermaster department and pocketed the difference. When Green Standard troops proved unable to fire their guns accurately while suppressing a rebellion of White Lotus followers under Wang Lun in 1774, the governor-general blamed the failure on enemy magic, prompting a furious reply from the Qianlong Emperor in which he described incompetence with firearms as a "common and pervasive disease" of the Green Standard Army, whose gunners were full of excuses.

Qing emperors attempted to reverse the decline of the military through a variety of means. Although it was under the Qianlong Emperor that the empire expanded to its greatest extent, the emperor and his officers frequently made note of the decline of martial discipline among the troops. Qianlong reinstituted the annual hunt at Mulan as a form of military training. Thousands of troops participated in these massive exercises, selected from among Eight Banners troops of both the capital and the garrisons. Qianlong also promoted military culture, directing his court painters to produce a large number of works on military themes, including victories in battle, the grand inspections of the army, and the imperial hunt at Mulan. By the late 19th century, China was fast descending into a semi-colonial state. Even the most conservative elements within the Qing court could no longer ignore China's military weakness in contrast to the foreign "barbarians" literally beating down its gates. In 1860, during the Second Opium War, a relatively small Anglo-French coalition force numbering 25,000 captured Beijing and sacked the Summer Palace. The shaken court attempted to modernize its military and industrial institutions by buying European technology. This Self-Strengthening Movement established shipyards (notably the Jiangnan Arsenal and the Foochow Arsenal) and bought modern guns and battleships in Europe.

=== Self-Strengthening: military modernization ===
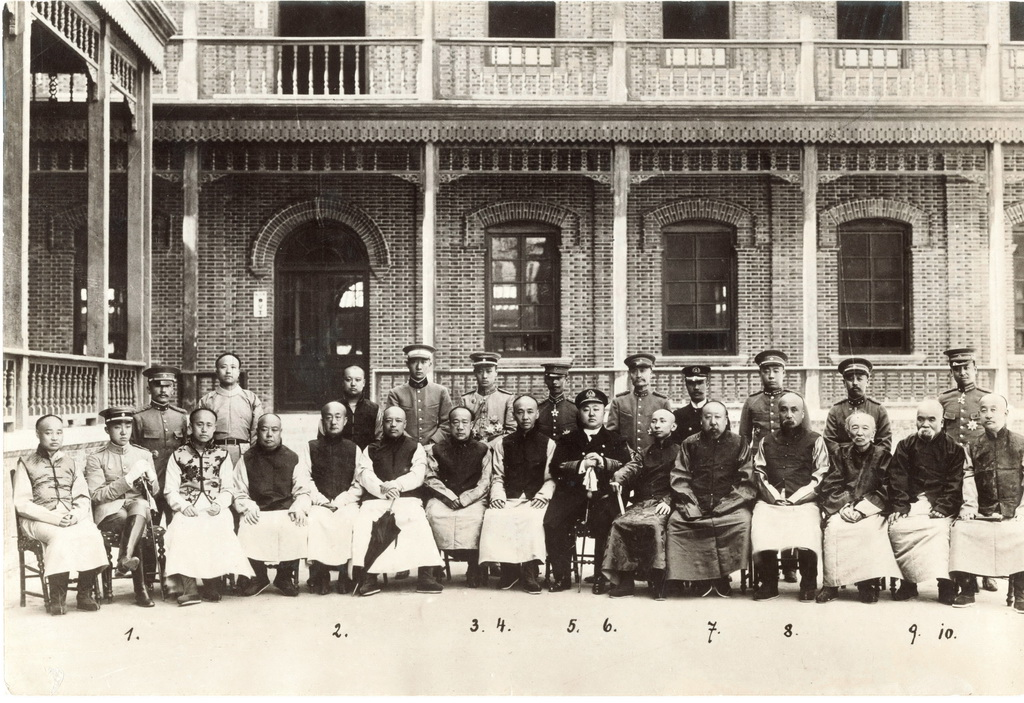
Several notable figures such as Zaitao, Zaixun, Xu Shichang, Sheng Xuanhuai, Zaizhen, and Yinchang

Although the Chinese invented gunpowder, and firearms had been in continual use in Chinese warfare since as far back as the Song dynasty, the advent of modern weaponry resulting from the European Industrial Revolution had rendered China's traditionally trained and equipped army and navy obsolete.

After the humiliating capture of Beijing and the sack of the Summer Palace in 1860, officials like Zeng Guofan, Li Hongzhang, and the Manchu Wenxiang made efforts to acquire advanced western weapons and copy western military organization. Special brigades of Chinese soldiers equipped with modern rifles and commanded by foreign officers (one example is the Ever Victorious Army commanded by Frederick Townsend Ward and later Charles George Gordon) helped Zeng and Li to defeat the Taiping rebels. Li Hongzhang's Huai Army also acquired western rifles and incorporated some western drills. Meanwhile, in Beijing, Prince Gong and Wenxiang created an elite army, the "Peking Field Force", which was armed with Russian rifles and French cannon and drilled by British officers. When this force of 2,500 bannermen defeated a bandit army more than ten times more numerous, they seemed to prove Wenxiang's point that a small but well-trained and well-equipped banner army would be sufficient to defend the capital in the future.

One major emphasis of the reforms was to improve the weaponry of Chinese armies. In order to produce modern rifles, artillery, and ammunition, Zeng Guofan created an arsenal in Suzhou, which was moved to Shanghai and expanded into the Jiangnan Arsenal (which was completed in 1865). In 1866, the sophisticated Fuzhou Shipyard was created under the leadership of Zuo Zongtang, its focus being the building of modern warships for coastal defense. From 1867 to 1874 it built fifteen new ships. Other arsenals were created in Nanjing, Tianjin (it served as a major source of ammunition for northern Chinese armies in the 1870s and 1880s), Lanzhou (to support Zuo Zongtang's quelling of a large Muslim uprising in the northwest), Sichuan, and Shandong. Prosper Giquel, a French naval officer who served as adviser at the Fuzhou Shipyard, wrote in 1872 that China was quickly becoming a formidable rival to western powers.

Thanks to these reforms and improvements, the Qing government gained a major advantage over domestic rebels. After vanquishing the Taiping in 1864, the newly equipped armies defeated the Nian Rebellion in 1868, the Guizhou Miao in 1873, the Panthay Rebellion in Yunnan in 1873, and in 1877 the massive Muslim uprising that had engulfed Xinjiang since 1862. In addition to quelling domestic revolts, the Qing also fought foreign powers with relative success. Qing armies managed to solve the 1874 crisis with Japan over Taiwan diplomatically, forced the Russians out of the Ili River valley in 1881, and fought the French to a standstill in the Sino-French War of 1884–1885 despite many failures in naval warfare.

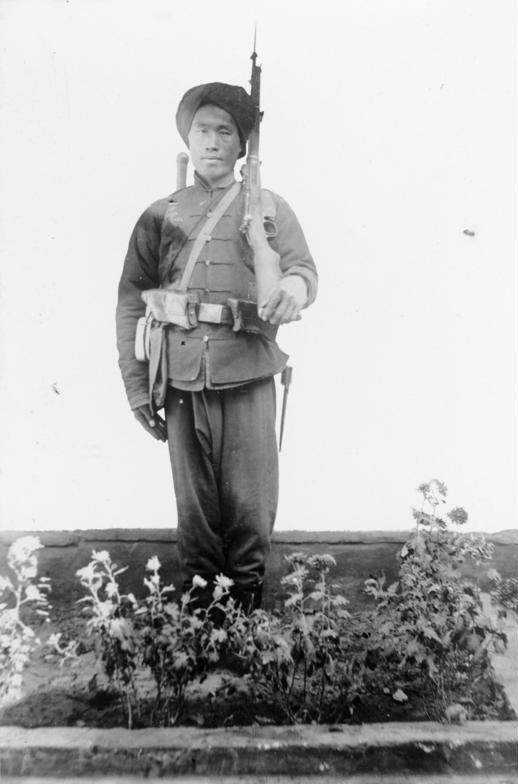
Chinese infantry

Foreign observers reported that, when their training was complete, the troops stationed in the Wuchang garrison were the equal of contemporary European forces. Mass media in the west during this era portrayed China as a rising military power due to its modernization programs and as a major threat to the western world, invoking fears that China would successfully conquer western colonies like Australia. Chinese armies were praised by John Russell Young, US envoy, who commented that "nothing seemed more perfect" in military capabilities, predicting a future confrontation between America and China." The Russian military observer D. V. Putiatia visited China in 1888 and found that in Northeastern China (Manchuria) along the Chinese-Russian border, the Chinese soldiers were potentially able to become adept at "European tactics" under certain circumstances, and the Chinese soldiers were armed with modern weapons like Krupp artillery, Winchester carbines, and Mauser rifles. On the eve of the First Sino-Japanese War, the German General Staff predicted a Japanese defeat and William Lang, who was a British advisor to the Chinese military, praised Chinese training, ships, guns, and fortifications, stating that "in the end, there is no doubt that Japan must be utterly crushed".

The military improvements that resulted from modernizing reforms were substantial, but they still proved insufficient, as the Qing was soundly defeated by Meiji Japan in the Sino-Japanese War of 1894–1895. Even China's best troops the Huai Army and the Beiyang Fleet, both commanded by Li Hongzhang were no match for Japan's better-trained, better led, and faster army and navy.

When it was first developed by Empress Dowager Cixi, the Beiyang Fleet was said to be the strongest navy in East Asia. Before her adopted son, Emperor Guangxu, took over the throne in 1889, Cixi wrote out explicit orders that the navy should continue to develop and expand gradually. However, after Cixi went into retirement, all naval and military development came to a drastic halt. Japan's victories over China has often been falsely rumored to be the fault of Cixi. Many believed that Cixi was the cause of the navy's defeat by embezzling funds from the navy in order to build the Summer Palace in Beijing. However, extensive research by Chinese historians revealed that Cixi was not the cause of the Chinese navy's decline. In actuality, China's defeat was caused by Emperor Guangxu's lack of interest in developing and maintaining the military. His close adviser, Grand Tutor Weng Tonghe, advised Guangxu to cut all funding to the navy and army, because he did not see Japan as a true threat, and there were several natural disasters during the early 1890s which the emperor thought to be more pressing to expend funds on.

The military defeats suffered by China has been attributed to the factionalism of regional military governors. For instance, the Beiyang Fleet refused to participate in the Sino-French War in 1884, the Nanyang Fleet retaliating by refusing to deploy during the Sino-Japanese War of 1895. Li Hongzhang wanted to personally maintain control of this fleet, many top vessels among its number, by keeping it in northern China and not let it slip into the control of southern factions. China did not have a single admiralty in charge of all the Chinese navies before 1885; the northern and southern Chinese navies did not cooperate, therefore enemy navies needed only to fight a segment of China's navy.

== Organization ==
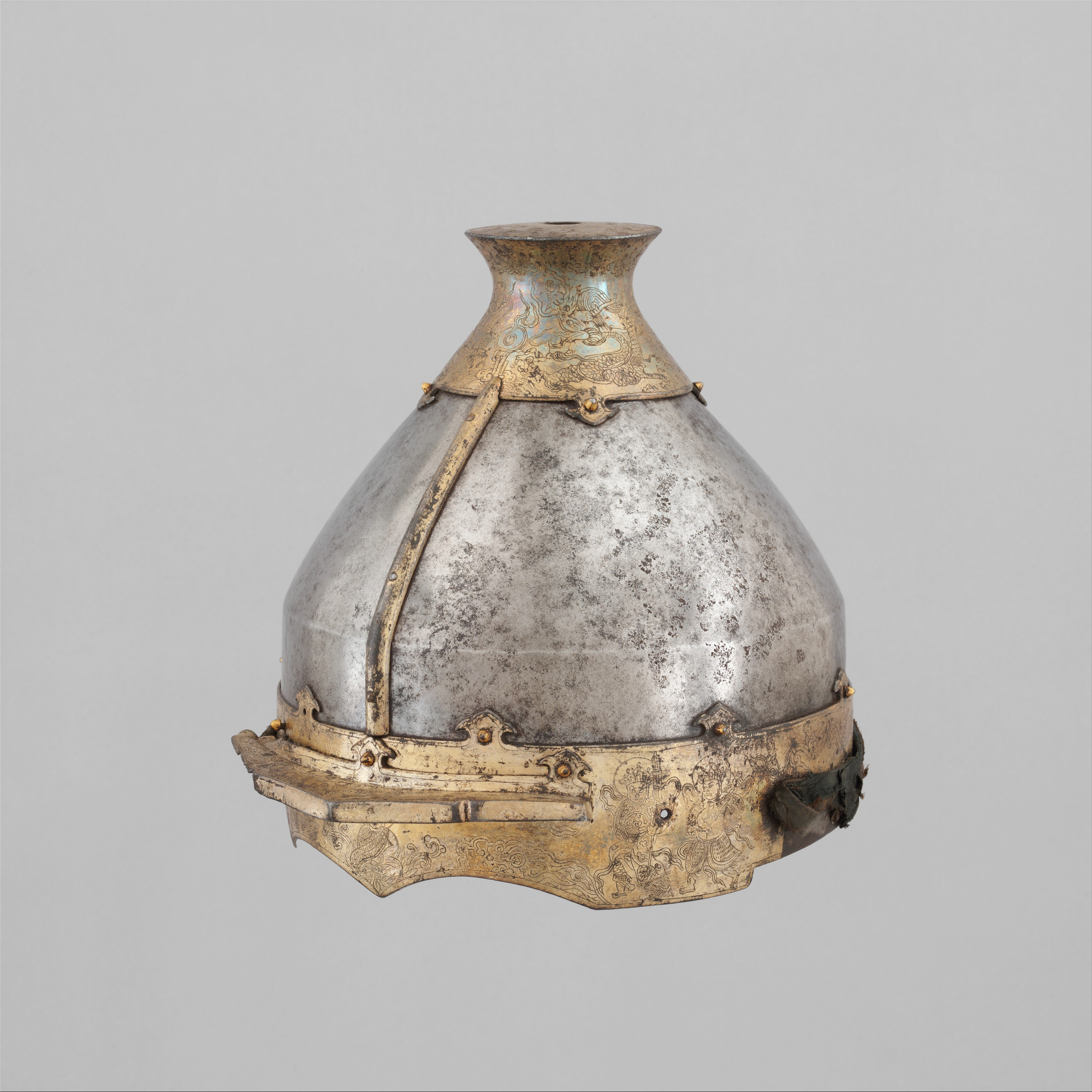
Early Qing dynasty helmet, mid to late 17th c.

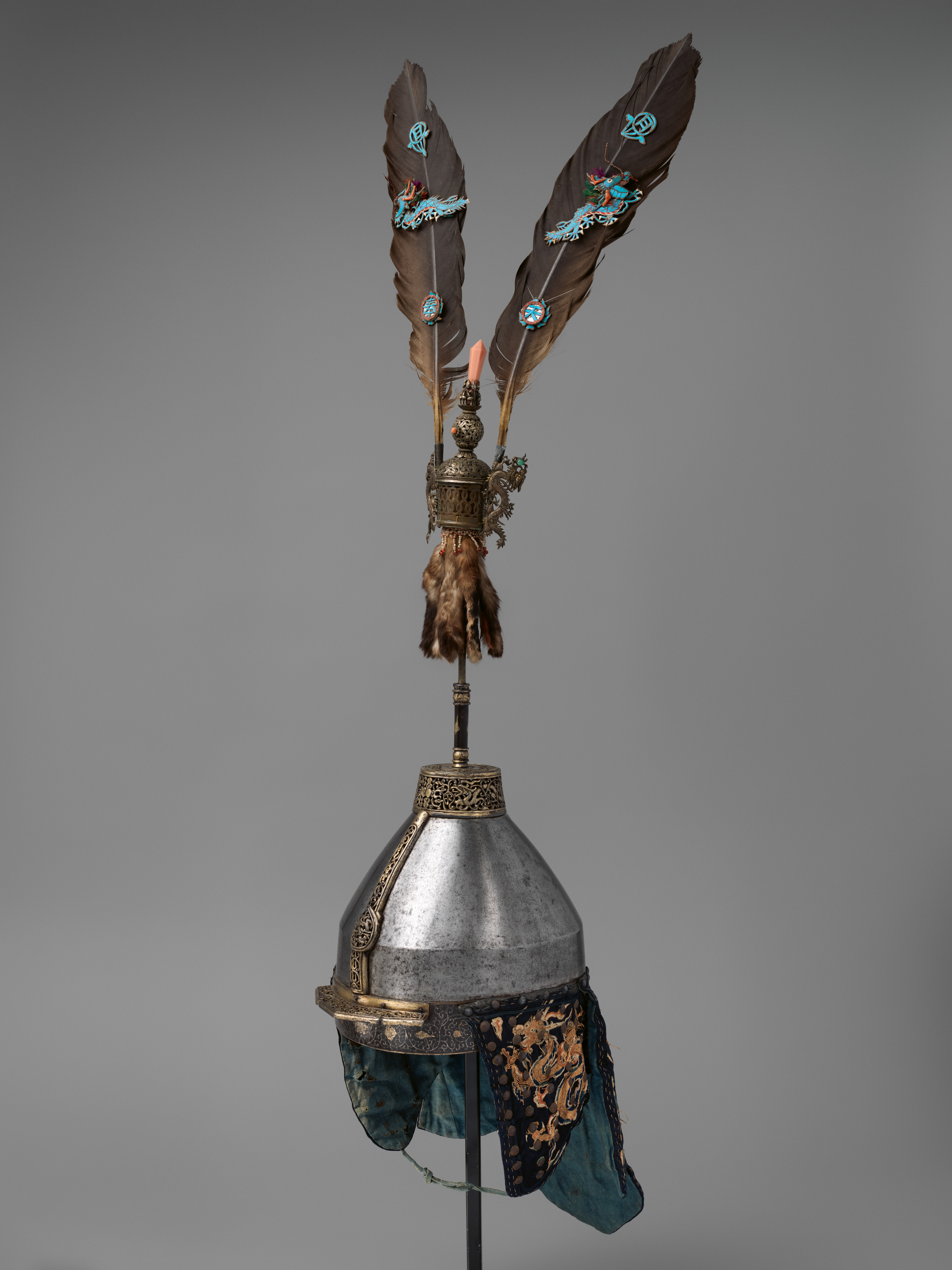
Qing helmet, 17th-18th c.

=== Eight Banners ===
One of the keys to Nurhaci's successful unification of Jurchen tribes and his challenge to the Ming dynasty in the early seventeenth century was the formation of the Eight Banners, a uniquely Manchu institution that was militarily efficient, but also played economic, social, and political roles. As early as 1601 and possibly a few years earlier, Nurhaci made his soldiers and their families register into permanent companies known as niru, the same name as the smaller hunting parties in which Jurchen men traditionally joined to practice military operations and wage war. Sometime before 1607, these companies were themselves grouped into larger units called gūsa, or "banners", differentiated by colors: yellow, white, red, and blue. In 1615 a red border was added to each flag (except for the red banner, to which a white border was added) to form a total of eight banners that Jurchen troops carried into battles. The banner system allowed Nurhaci's new state to absorb defeated Jurchen tribes simply by adding companies; this integration in turn helped to reorganize Jurchen society beyond petty clan affiliations.

As Qing power expanded north of the Great Wall, the Banner system kept expanding too. Soon after defeating the Chahar Mongols with the help of other Mongol tribes in 1635, Nurhaci's son and successor Hong Taiji incorporated his new Mongol subjects and allies into the Mongol Eight Banners, which ran parallel to the original Manchu banners. Hong Taiji was more prudent in integrating Chinese troops. In 1629, he first created a "Chinese army" (Manchu: ᠨᡳᡴᠠᠨ
ᠴᠣᠣᡥᠠ nikan cooha; Chinese: 漢軍; pinyin: Hànjūn) of about 3000 men. In 1631 these Chinese units absorbed men that could build and operate European-style cannon, and were therefore renamed "Heavy Troops" (M.: ujen cooha; Chinese: 重軍; pinyin: Zhòngjūn). By 1633 they counted about 20 companies and 4,500 men fighting under black standards. These Chinese companies were grouped into two banners in 1637, four in 1639, and finally eight banners in 1642. These "Hanjun" banners are known as the "Chinese" or "Chinese-martial" banners.

Select groups of Han Chinese bannermen were mass-transferred into Manchu Banners by the Qing, changing their ethnicity from Han Chinese to Manchu. Han Chinese bannermen of Tai Nikan 台尼堪 (watchpost Chinese) and Fusi Nikan 抚顺尼堪 (Fushun Chinese) backgrounds merged into the Manchu banners in 1740 by order of the Qing Qianlong emperor. It was between 1618 and 1629 when the Han Chinese from Liaodong who later became the Fushun Nikan and Tai Nikan defected to the Jurchen (Manchus).

Manchu clans of Han Chinese origin continued to use their Han surnames and were marked as of Han origin on Qing lists of Manchu clans. Manchu families adopted Han Chinese sons from families of bondservant Booi Aha (baoyi) origin and they served in Manchu company registers as detached household Manchus and the Qing imperial court found this out in 1729. Manchu bannermen who needed money helped falsify registration for Han Chinese servants being adopted into the Manchu banners and Manchu families who lacked sons were allowed to adopt their servants' sons, or the servants themselves. The Manchu families were paid to adopt Han Chinese sons from bondservant families by those families. The Qing Imperial Guard captain Batu was furious at Manchus who adopted Han Chinese from slave and bondservant families in exchange for money, and expressed his displeasure at them adopting Han Chinese instead of other Manchus. These Han Chinese who infiltrated the Manchu Banners by adoption were known as "secondary-status bannermen" and "false Manchus" or "separate-register Manchus", and there were eventually so many of them that they took over military positions in the Banners that would have been reserved for Manchus. Han Chinese foster-son and separate-register bannermen made up 800 of 1,600 soldiers in the Mongol Banners and Manchu Banners of Hangzhou in 1740, which was nearly 50%. Han Chinese foster-sons made up 220 out of 1,600 unsalaried troops at Jingzhou in 1747 and an assortment of Han Chinese separate-register, Mongol, and Manchu bannermen made up the remainder. Han Chinese secondary status bannermen made up 180 of 3,600 troop households in Ningxia, while Han Chinese separate-registers made up 380 of 2,700 Manchu soldiers in Liangzhou. Because Han Chinese Manchus filled up military positions, few Manchus gained positions as soldiers in the Banner armies. The Han Chinese were said to be good military troops and their marching and archery skills were up to par; the Zhapu lieutenant general couldn't differentiate them from true Manchus in terms of military skills. Manchu Banners contained a lot of "false Manchus" who were from Han Chinese civilian families but were adopted by Manchu bannermen after the Yongzheng reign. The Jingkou and Jiangning Mongol banners and Manchu Banners had 1,795 adopted Han Chinese and the Beijing Mongol Banners and Manchu Banners had 2,400 adopted Han Chinese in statistics taken from the 1821 census. Despite Qing attempts to differentiate adopted Han Chinese from normal Manchu bannermen the differences between them became hazy. These adopted Han Chinese bondservants who managed to get themselves into Manchu banner roles were called kaihu ren (開戶人) in Chinese and dangse faksalaha urse in Manchu. Other Manchus were called jingkini Manjusa.

The Manchus sent Han bannermen to fight against Koxinga's Ming loyalists in Fujian. The Qing carried out a seaban, forcing people to evacuate the coast, in order to deprive Koxinga's Ming loyalists of resources. This led to a myth that it was because Manchus were "afraid of water". In Fujian, Han Chinese bannermen were fighting on behalf of the Qing, which disproves the claim that Manchus feared the water. A poem shows northern Han bannermen referring to the Tanka boat people living on the coast and rivers of Southern Fujian as "barbarians".

The banners in their order of precedence were as follows: yellow, bordered yellow, white, red, bordered white, bordered red, blue, and bordered blue. The yellow, bordered yellow, and white banners were collectively known as the "Upper Three Banners" (Chinese: 上三旗; pinyin: shàng sān qí) and were under the direct command of the emperor. Only Manchus belonging to the Upper Three Banners, and selected Han Chinese who had passed the highest level of martial exams, were qualified to serve as the emperor's personal bodyguards. The remaining Banners were known as the "Lower Five Banners" (Chinese: 下五旗; pinyin: xià wǔ qí) and were commanded by hereditary Manchu princes descended from Nurhachi's immediate family, known informally as the "Iron Cap Princes". In Nurhaci's era and the early Hong Taiij era, these princes formed the Deliberative Council of Princes and Ministers as well as high command of the army.

==== Organisation ====
The Eight Banners were officially organised into 24 kusai with each banner containing 1 Kusai each of Mongol, Manchu and Han though the Manchus consisted of 75% of the personnel, by the time of the rebellion due to stagnant pay and provisions many did not even possess a mount when allowance was supposed to be sufficient for 3-6 horses. The reality was that this elite army was mostly part-time soldiers who did civilian work to survive and occasionally assembled for a lacklustre series of drills when called upon before being told to fight more akin to a militia army than the elite reserve it was supposed to be.

Each Kusai had 5 battalions (2 for the Mongols) of 1,500 men and subdivided into 5 Niru of 300 though by 1851 most Niru did not number more than 150 or even more than 50 men. Despite this formal organisation reality was often much different with the Bannermen dispersed in various garrisons in various sizes with a force over 3,000 men being commanded by a Tartar-General who was the highest military ranked official in the Viceroyalty where he was stationed, garrisons between 1,000 and 3,000 were commanded by a Deputy-General and those smaller by a Commandant.

Upper Three Banners

Plain Yellow Banner

Bordered Yellow Banner

Plain White Banner

Lower Five Banners

Plain Red Banner

Bordered White Banner

Bordered Red Banner

Plain Blue Banner

Bordered Blue Banner

Organisation of the Eight Banners 1851
Subdivision name	Number	Ethnic composition	Brief description
6 Capital divisions			
Imperial Bodyguard	3,000	Manchu	Ceremonial cavalry
Vanguard	1,500-2,000	Manchu and Mongol	infantry
Flank division	15,000-16,000	Manchu and Mongol	infantry and cavalry
Light division	3,000-4,000	Mongol and Chinese	Chinese infantry Mongolian cavalry
Firearms division	8,000	Manchu and Mongol	organised into inner and outer units inner for Beijing outer for field service
Paid force	66,000	8,250 Mongols 28,875 Manchus 28,875 Chinese	The only combat ready formation of the 6 divisions predominantly cavalry with 7,000 matchlock men 100 sword and bucklermen and 100 artillerymen
Total	96,500-99,000		
Foot force	23,200	15,000 Manchus 4,500 Mongols 3,700 Chinese	Beijing police force mostly infantry with a small mounted matchlock security force
Imperial Mausolea force	1,250		Garrisoning the Imperial Maosoleum
Metropolitan Garrison	40,000		Garrisoning the 25 cities around Beijing
Yuanmingyuan force	5,800		Garrisoning the Old Summer Palace (also possessed 550 artillery pieces)
Provincial garrisons	80,750-83,250		25 garrisons in the provinces of varying sizes
Grand Total*	250,000		

*In 1862 the Peking field force was founded consisting of 3,000 men

Expenditure on military forces 1885
Location	Bannermen	Green Standard	Total
Zhili		1,321,953	1,321,953
Liaoning (given as Fengtian)	641,991		641,991
Jilin	432,173		432,173
Heilongjiang	331,127		331,127
Shandong	110,262	361,348	471,610
Shanxi	273,484	389,740	663,224
Henan	119,188	289,223	408,411
Jiangsu	317,250	578,664	895,914
Anhui		197,198	197,198
Jiangxi		225,166	225,166
Fujian	125,564	851,740	1,007,034
Zhejiang	153,904	692,125	846,029
Hubei	319,023	286,000	605,023
Hunan		425,047	425,047
Shaanxi	357,856	208,259	566,125
Xinjiang	449,203	1,568,039	2,017,242
Sichuan		952,329	952,239
Guangdong	168,702	1,115,777	1,284,479
Guangxi		205,768	205,768
Yunnan		355,664	355,664
Guizhou		491,537	491,537
Total	4,006,411	10,886,904	14,913,215

=== Green Standard Army ===
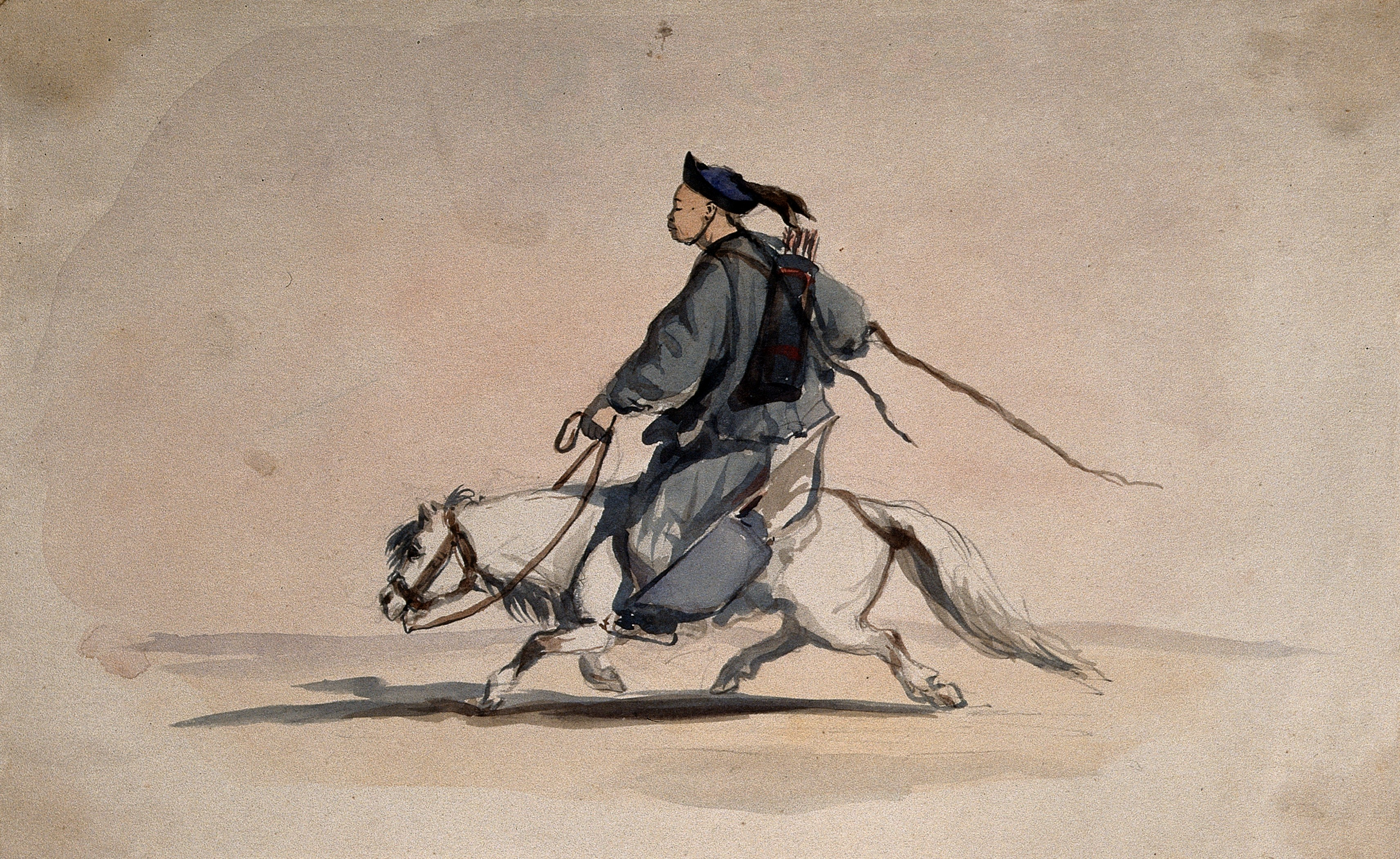
A Green Standard Army horse archer

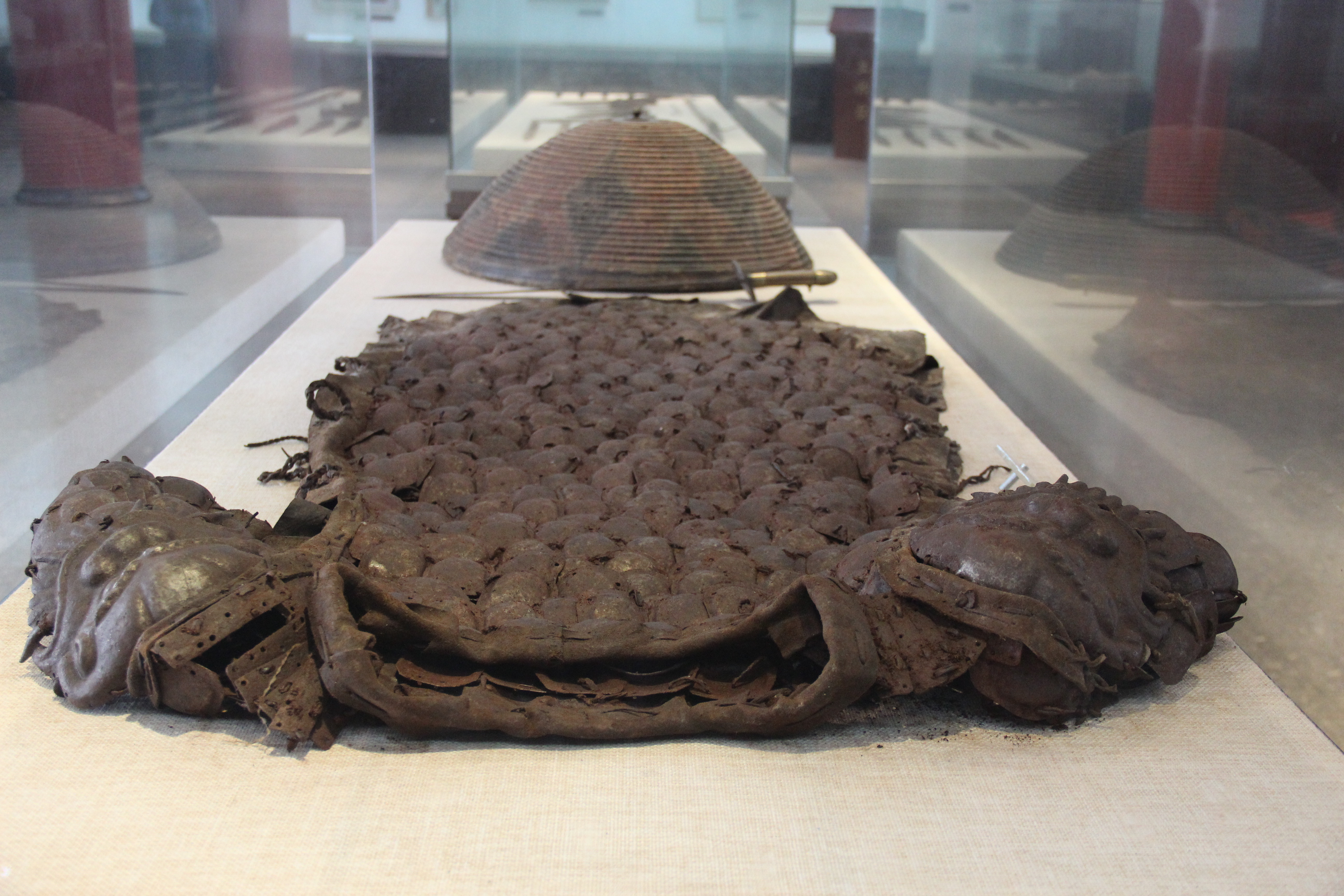
Scale armour with lionhead shoulder guards, Qing dynasty

The Qing created Chinese armies in the regions it conquered. Green Standard armies were created in Shanxi, Shaanxi, Gansu, and Jiangnan in 1645, in Fujian in 1650, in Lianguang (Guangdong and Guangxi) in 1651, in Guizhou in 1658, and in Yunnan in 1659. They maintained their Ming-era ranks and were led by a mix of Banner and Green Standard officers. These Chinese troops eventually outnumbered Banner troops three to one (about 600,000 Green Standard troops to 200,000 bannermen). The Banners and Green Standard troops were standing armies, paid for by the central government. In addition, regional governors from provincial down to village level maintained their own irregular local militias for police duties and disaster relief. These militias were usually granted small annual stipends from regional coffers for part-time service obligations.

The Qing divided the command structure of the Green Standard Army in the provinces between the high-ranking officers and low ranking officers, the best and strongest unit was under the control of the highest-ranking officers but at the same time, these units were outnumbered by other units divided between individual lower ranking officers so none of them could revolt on their own against the Qing because they did not control the entire armies.

Manchu generals and bannermen were initially put to shame by the better performance of the Han Chinese Green Standard Army, who fought better than them against the rebels, and this was noted by the Kangxi Emperor, leading him to task Generals Sun Sike, Wang Jinbao, and Zhao Liangdong to lead Green Standard soldiers to crush the rebels.

The Army was entirely non-Manchu and despite its name functioned more akin to 18 provincial armies rather than a singular unified army. At the onset of the war the army was inefficient and militarily incapable due to various issues including a lack of training (a ying in Zhoushan having not trained in 8 years), opium usage, corruption and inadequate pay. Despite many concurrent rebellions in the 1850s many Green Standard formations remained chronically understrength many at only one-third strength, by the 1860s the situation improved and most units were at half-strength though it was common practice to hire vagabonds and peasants and enroll them when needed therefore the quality of the army did not increase.

The Army of the Green Standard was divided into 3 types the garrison infantry, the infantry and the cavalry. In 1851 it was estimated that there were 321,900 garrison infantry, 194,800 infantry and 87,100 cavalry and 7,400 officers. In coastal provinces up to a third of the cavalry were actually shuiying or marines and not actual cavalry. The army was organised into Ying nominally of 500 but in reality varying from 50 to 1,000 men in size with a ying subdivided into 2 Shao (patrols) which were further subdivided into between 2 and 4 Si each with each Si containing a varied amount of Peng (squads). However, only 10% of the green standard army was active thus, of a total of over 600,000 only 60,000 or so were actively with the colours at any given point of time.

In the mid-1880s the Green Standard was said to be some 447,876 men strong grouped into formations of varying sizes. Six units were below 1,000 men, 29 units between 2,000 and 3,000, 25 between 2,000 and 3,000, 20 between 3,000 and 4,000, 6 between 4,000 and 6,000, 4 units between 6,000 and 7,000, 1 unit between 8,000 and 9,000, 4 units between 9,000 and 10,000 and 1 unit over 10,000. With a further 31 units of an unspecified amount for a total of 127 units with an average of slightly above 3,500 per unit.

=== Garrisons in peacetime ===
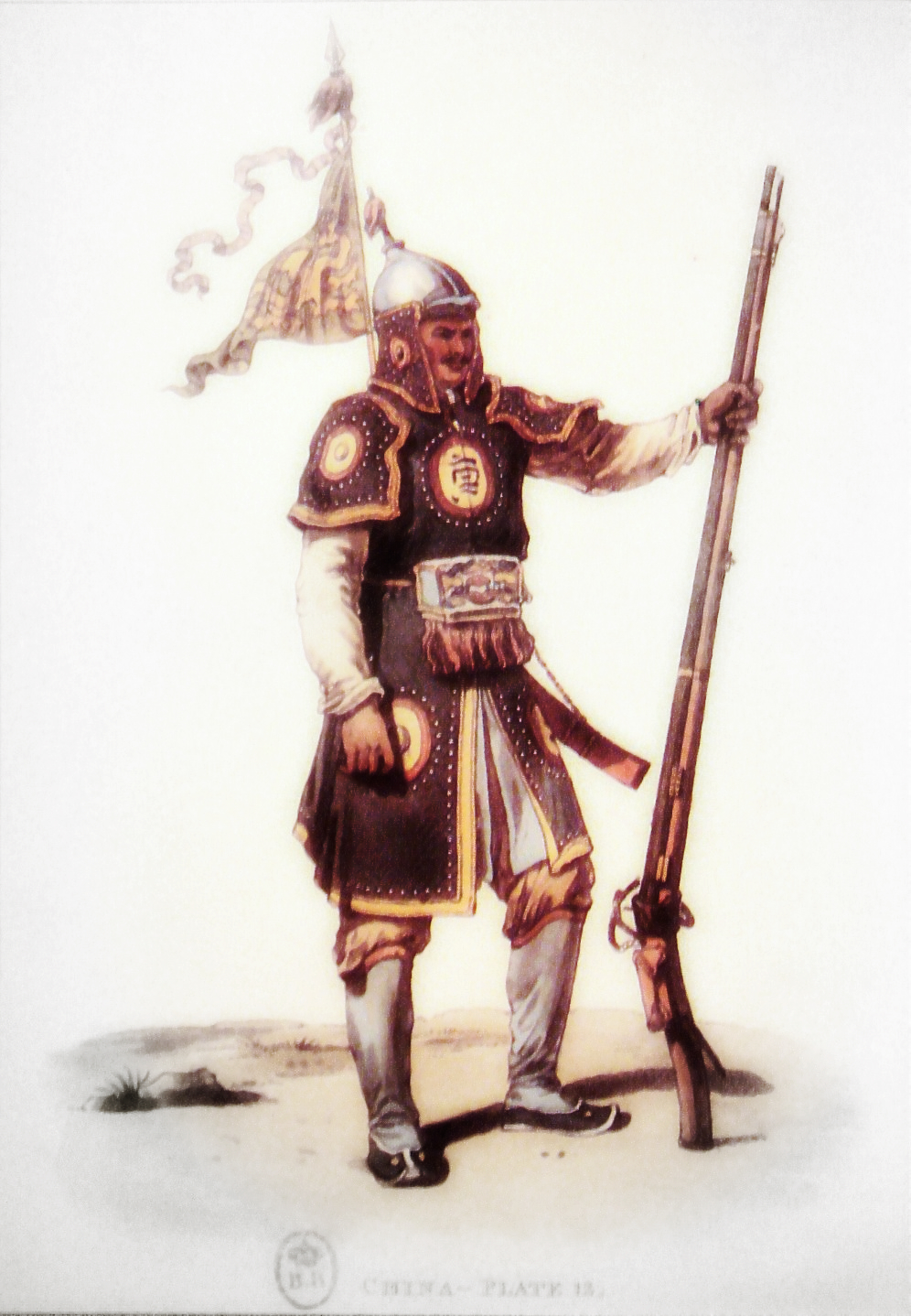
1793 painting of a Firearm Battalion musketeer

Banner armies were broadly divided along ethnic lines, namely Manchu and Mongol, although the ethnic composition of Manchu banners was far from homogeneous, as they included non-Manchu bondservants registered under the household of their Manchu masters. As the war with the Ming dynasty progressed and the Han Chinese population under Manchu rule increased, Hong Taiji created a separate branch of Han Banners to draw on this new source of manpower. The Six Ministries and other major positions were filled with Han Bannermen chosen by the Qing. It was Han Chinese bannermen who were responsible for the successful Qing takeover of China. They made up the majority of governors in the early Qing and were the ones who governed and administered China after the conquest, stabilizing Qing rule. Han bannermen dominated governor-general posts in the time of the Shunzhi and Kangxi Emperors, as well as governor posts, largely excluding ordinary Han civilians. The political barrier was between non-bannermen and the "conquest elite" of bannermen whether Han Chinese, Mongols or Manchu. It was not ethnicity which was the factor.

The social origins of the Banner system meant that the population of each branch and their sub-divisions was hereditary and rigid. Only under special circumstances sanctioned by imperial edict was miscegenation between banners permitted. In contrast, the Green Standard Army was originally intended to be a professional force.

After defeating the remnants of the Ming forces, the Manchu Banner Army, approximately 200,000 strong at the time, was evenly divided; half was designated the Forbidden Eight Banner Army (Chinese: 禁旅八旗; pinyin: jìnlǚ bāqí) and was stationed in Beijing. It served both as the capital's garrison and the Qing government's main strike force. The remainder of the Banner troops were distributed to guard key cities in China. These were known as the Territorial Eight Banner Army (simplified Chinese: 驻防八旗; traditional Chinese: 駐防八旗; pinyin: zhùfáng bāqí). The Manchu court, keenly aware its own minority status, reinforced a strict policy of racial segregation between the Manchus and Mongols from Han Chinese for fear of being sinicized by the latter. This policy applied directly to the banner garrisons, most of which occupied a separate walled zone within the cities where they were stationed. In cities where there were limitations of space such as in Qingzhou, a new fortified town was purposely erected to house the banner garrison and their families. Beijing being the imperial seat, the regent Dorgon had the entire Chinese population forcibly relocated to the southern suburbs which became known as the "Outer Citadel" (Chinese: 外城; pinyin: wàichéng). The northern walled city, called "Inner Citadel" (Chinese: 內城; pinyin: nèichéng), was portioned out to the remaining Manchu Eight Banners, each responsible for guarding a section of the Inner Citadel surrounding the Forbidden City palace complex. (Note: Chinese: 紫禁城; pinyin: zǐjìnchéng; Ma: Dabkūri dorgi hoton)

Military training was undertaken by martial artists in the Qing armed forces.

Associations for martial arts were joined by Manchu bannermen in Beijing.

A hall for martial arts was where the military careers of Muslim generals Ma Fulu and Ma Fuxiang started in Hezhou.

Soldiers and officers in the Qing army were taught by the Muslim martial arts instructor Wang Zi-Ping before he fought in the Boxer rebellion. Another teacher of martial arts of the military in Beijing was Wang Xiang Zhai. The army martial arts trainers imhad to deal with a massive assortment of different armaments such as spears and swords. Gunpowder weaponry had been long used by China so the idea that melee combat in China was replaced out of thin air by western guns is a myth. Cavalry were also taught martial arts. Martial arts were part of the exams for military officers. Martial artists were among those who migrated into cities from the countryside. The Qing and Ming military drew on the Shaolin tradition. Techniques and armaments cross fertilized across the army and civilian realms. The army included trainers in martial arts from the Taoists. The Taiping military had martial artists.

=== Technology ===
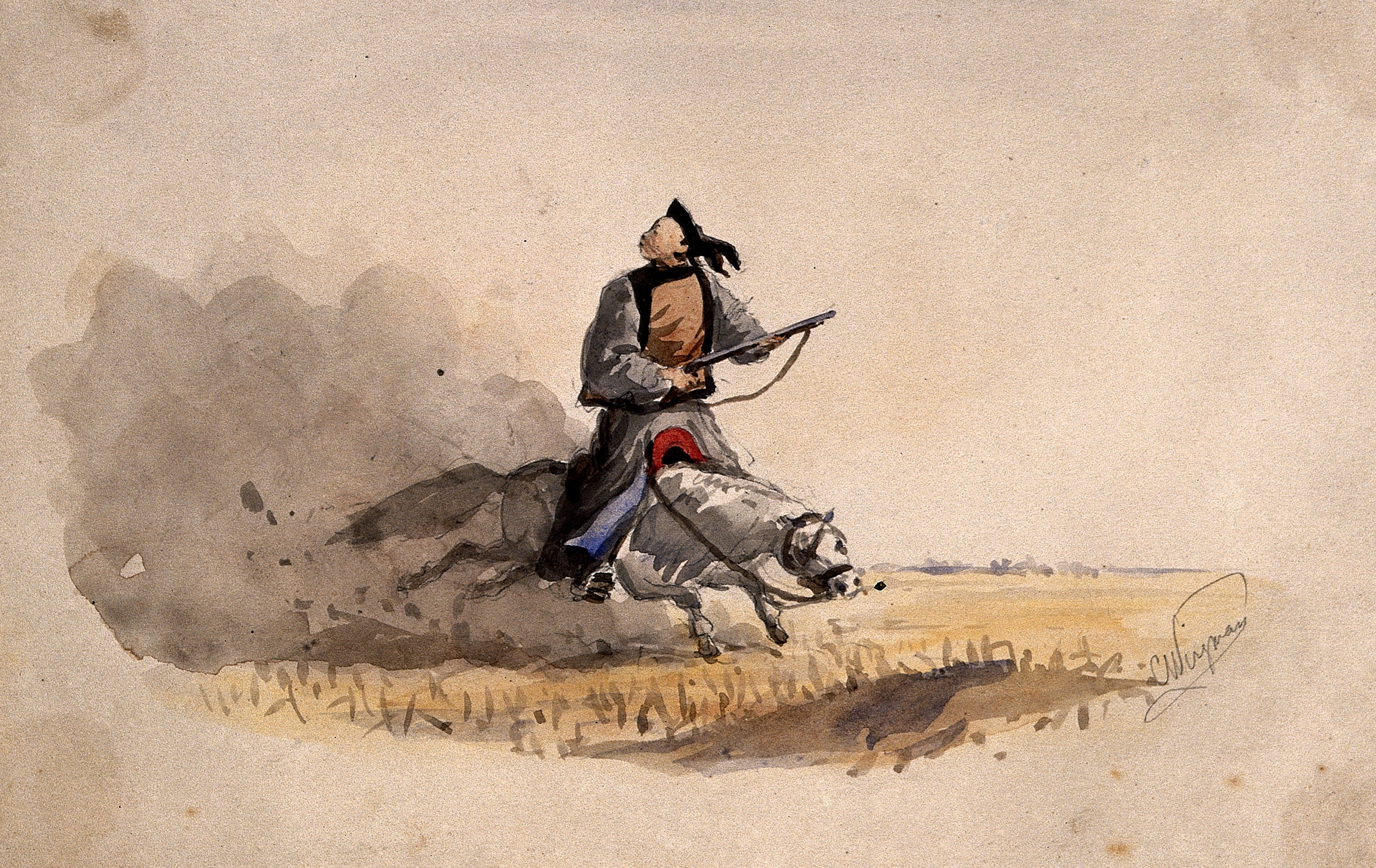
A Green Standard Army cavalryman

Qing armies in the eighteenth century may not have been as well-armed as their European counterparts, but under pressure from the imperial throne they proved capable of innovation and efficiency, sometimes in difficult circumstances. Shi Lang's fleet to crush the Ming resistance in Taiwan incorporated Dutch naval technology.

The Qing dynasty established the Firearm Battalion or Huoqiying as one of the elite military divisions stationed around the capital Beijing. It was a special force that incorporated all the musket and cannon specialists previously subordinated to the Eight Banners. Its role was similar to the Shenjiying of the Ming dynasty. The entire Firearm Battalion practiced firearms training, and the firearms they practiced include shotguns and large cannons. Composed of Eight Banners soldiers, it was responsible for guarding the imperial city of Beijing.

The Qing court restricted the usage of firearms at times. Fishing boats and coastal vessels were forbidden from using them and firearms were reserved for hunting only. Manchu leaders tried to prevent Han Chinese military divisions from using the most powerful handguns while reserving them for Manchu units. In 1778, the Qianlong Emperor criticized the governor of Shandong Province for training militia in the use of firearms. The Manchus themselves appeared to have spent more time practicing with the bow than with firearms. It is suggested that this was due to the traditional role of archery in Manchu culture.

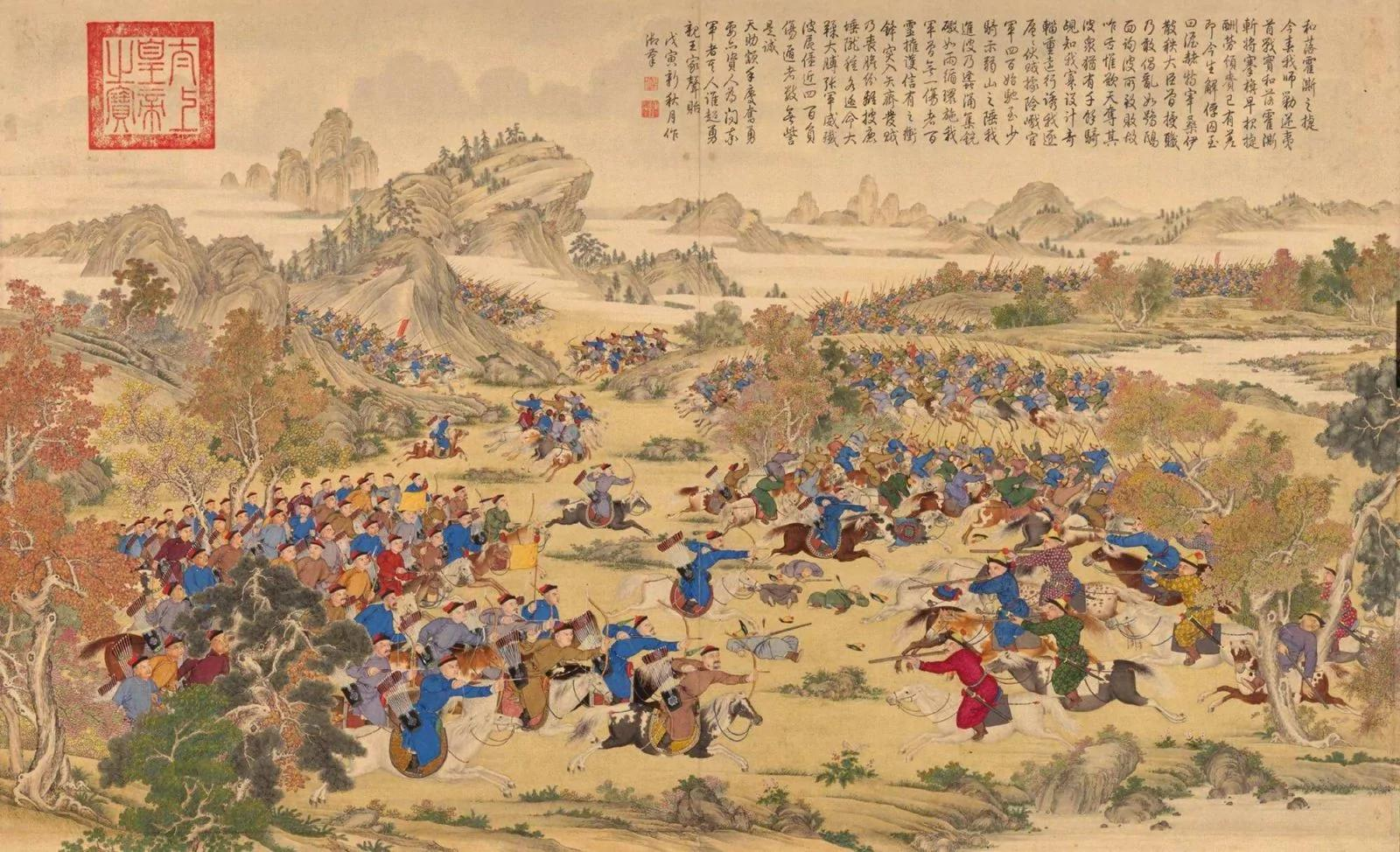
The Eight Banners army armed with bow and arrow going to into battle against Dzungar forces armed with firearms

It is estimated that 30 to 40% of Chinese soldiers at the time of the First Opium War were equipped with firearms, typically matchlock muskets.

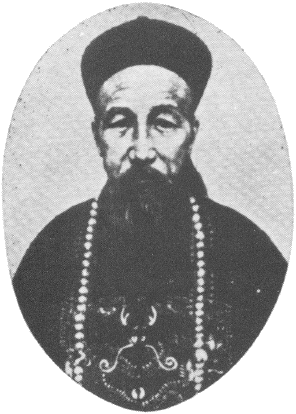
General Zeng Guofan

=== Navy ===
The "sea ban" policy during the early Qing dynasty meant that the development of naval power stagnated. River and coastal naval defence was the responsibility of the waterborne units of the Green Standard Army, which were based at Jingkou (now Zhenjiang) and Hangzhou.

In 1661, a naval unit was established at Jilin to defend against Russian incursions into Manchuria. Naval units were also added to various banner garrisons subsequently, referred to collectively as the "Eight Banners Navy". In 1677, the Qing court re-established the Fujian Fleet in order to combat the Ming-loyalist Kingdom of Tungning based on Taiwan. This conflict culminated in the Qing victory at the Battle of Penghu in 1683 and the surrender of the Tungning shortly after the battle.

The Qing, like the Ming, placed considerable importance on the building of a strong navy. However unlike the Europeans, they did not perceive the need to dominate the open ocean and hence monopolise trade, and instead focused on defending, by means of patrols, their inner sea space. The Qing demarcated and controlled their inner seas in the same manner as land territory.

The Kangxi Emperor and his successors established a four-zone sea defence system consisting of the Bohai Gulf (Dengzhou fleet, Jiaozhou fleet, Lüshun fleet and Tianjin/Daigu fleet), Jiangsu-Zhejiang coast (Jiangnan fleet and Zhejiang fleet), Taiwan Strait (Fujian fleet) and the Guangdong coast (Guangdong Governor's fleet and Guangdong regular fleet). The fleets were supported by a chain of coastal artillery batteries along the coast and "water castles" or naval bases. Qing warships of the Kangxi era had a crew of 40 seamen and were armed with cannons and wall guns of Dutch design.

Although the Qing had invested in naval defences for their adjacent seas in earlier periods, after the death of the Qianlong Emperor in 1799, the navy decayed as more attention was directed to suppressing the Miao Rebellion and White Lotus Rebellion, which left the Qing treasury bankrupt. The remaining naval forces were badly overstretched, undermanned, underfunded and uncoordinated.

=== Yong Ying ===
Initially, locally organised and paid for these small militias soon grew during the Qing dynasty into fully-fledged armies. The initial forces known as the tuanlian were village militias primarily armed with spears, swords bows and eventually sporadically matchlocks as the rebellions progressed. These self-defense militias were primarily used for protecting the immediate territories their men were drawn from and would fight Qing or Taiping forces if needed. Each of the tuanlian possessed between 200 and 500 men in companies of 100 though it was not uncommon for several communities to combine their tuanlian to form a force of several thousand men. Urban regions had their own counterpart the Thou-ping.

The 'Brave battalions' or Yong Ying were raised from the 1850s onwards as sanctioned by Beijing to assist the regular imperial armies in their duties. Over time these armies became progressively larger and increasingly well-organised with the largest such as the Huai and Xiang armies grew to over 100,000 men

Yong Ying/Lianjun army size
	Xiang Army	Huai Army	Chonghou's army	New Hunan Army	Hubei Army	Gansu Army	Zhang Zhidong's army	Manchurian Army
1860-1870	137,600	75,240	12,000	40,000				
1870-1890		39,800						7,500
1890-1900	23,800 (jiangsu)	8,500 (jiangsu)			4,300 infantry 1,500 cavalry	750 infantry 100-200 cavalry	3,300	11,700

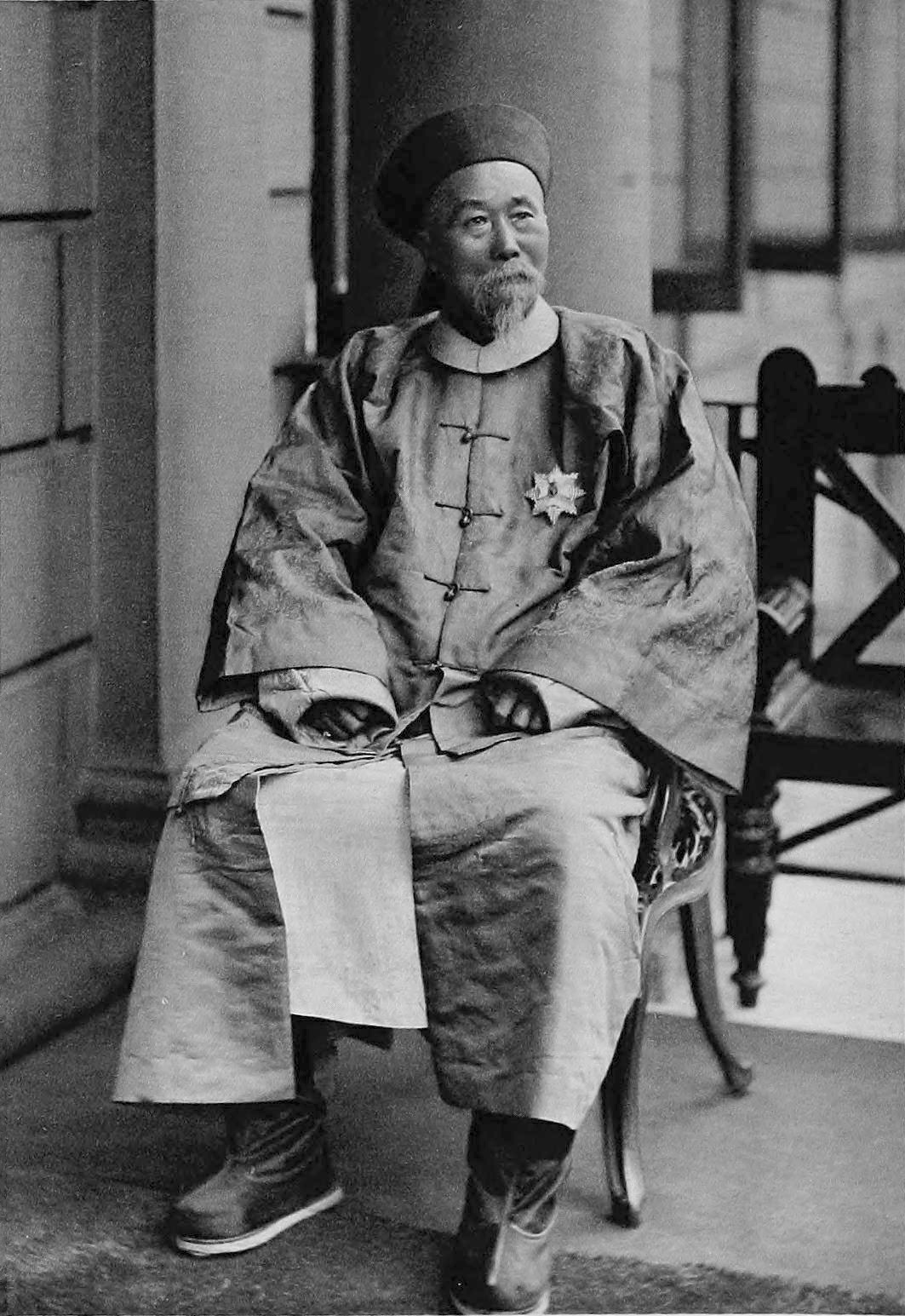
Li Hongzhang commander of the Huai Army and Beiyang fleet the forces responsible for the majority of the fighting of the First Sino-Japanese war.

=== First Sino-Japanese war ===
The Qing military as a heterogenous mix of formations some overlapping cannot be accurately estimated most contemporary estimates vary wildly in figures and categories. It is impossible to obtain a complete and accurate record of the forces of the Qing dynasty on the eve of the conflict.

An observer at the time estimated the Chinese forces on the eve of the First Sino-Japanese war as just under 1,100,000 men, but noted that this was likely an overstatement and in practice the force was likely smaller. Trained China forces in the zone totalled 92,390 infantry, 23,410 cavalry 7,010 artillerymen both field and garrison 1,090 mine troops (naval) and 1,130 boatmen for the canals and rivers. The Artillery were armed with 70mm and 80mm Krupp guns but their training was lacking especially in gunnery.

The Distribution and Strength of the army in the Zone of operations and elsewhere:
Location	Bannermen	Green Standard*	Trained men (braves and Green standard*)	Total
Beijing	125,610	10,000	28,720	163,340
Coastal Zhili	1,070	8,090	28,150	37,310
Interior Zhili	17,040	16,280	10,560	43,880
Zhili Total	143,270	34,370	66,980	244,260
Coastal Shandong	0	3,620	9,130	12,750
Interior Shandong	2,510	13,770	9,270	23,550
Total Shandong	2,510	17,390	18,400	38,300
Coastal Shengjing (Liaoning)	4,170	0	15,160	19,330
Interior Shengjing (Liaoning)	11,880	0	7,150	19,030
Total Shengjing (Liaoning)	16,050	0	22,310	38,360
Total Heilongjiang	8,080	0	8,040	16,120
Total Jilin	10,400	0	9,300	19,700
Total Manchuria	34,530	0	39,470	74,180
Total Zhili, Shandong and Manchuria	180,310	51,760	125,030	357,100
Total rest of China	145,290	305,390	283,800	734,480
Total whole empire	325,600	357,150	408,830	1,091,580

*approximately 100,000 men of the trained army were simultaneously enrolled in the green standard

An alternative figure is given Volpicelli:

The Distribution and Strength of Qing forces in 1894
Provinces	Banner Army	Green Standard Army	Braves	Trained Army
Zhili	162,646	47,138	22,700	4,000
Shanxi	4,149	26,288	5,700	
Shandong	2,405	25,406	6,500	
Henan	1,011	8,943	4,500	5,000
Jiangsu and Anhui	6,539	46,840	27,100	
Jiangxi		11,074		
Zhejiang	4,055	37,546	2,850	
Fujian	2,781	62,573	5,500	
Guangdong	5,356	69,015	3,000	
Guangxi		11,535		3,000
Sichuan	2,065	34,790	12.900	
Hubei	5,842	22,603	6,000	
Hunan		26,470		
Shaanxi	6,719	43,261		
Gansu	5,791	43,519		
Yunnan		36,110		
Guizhou		30,613		
Shengjing*	19,952			
Jilin*	10,712			
Amur*	11,661			
Xinjiang	15,548	15,295		
Total	266,872	599,019	96,750	12,000

*There also existed a 170,000 strong Manchurian Army of which there were 12,000 trained infantry 1,500 trained cavalry and 60 guns. Divided equally between the 3 provinces giving each province 4,000 infantry 500 cavalry and 20 guns. This force being organised by Wu Dacheng in the late 1880s but no further training of the remaining 156,500 soldiers was conducted prior to the outbreak of war.

The entire Qing army on the eve of the war therefore consisted of 974,641 soldiers (not including the Manchurian army or those on Taiwan). Jowett states that of the nearly 600,000 Green Standard soldiers only 50,000 had received modern training and firearms. The table above does not include the garrison for Taiwan Esposito gives the garrison of Taiwan at 20 Brave battalions or 10,000 men on paper with an additional 14,000 green standard soldiers again on paper. Though during the war reinforcements from mainland China and native levies led to the growth of the strength of the forces on Taiwan to 50,000. Zenone's account states that anywhere between 20,000 and 30,000 of the Metropolitan banners were actual soldiers with the ability to fight. Esposito states that 60% of the Banner army was cavalry.

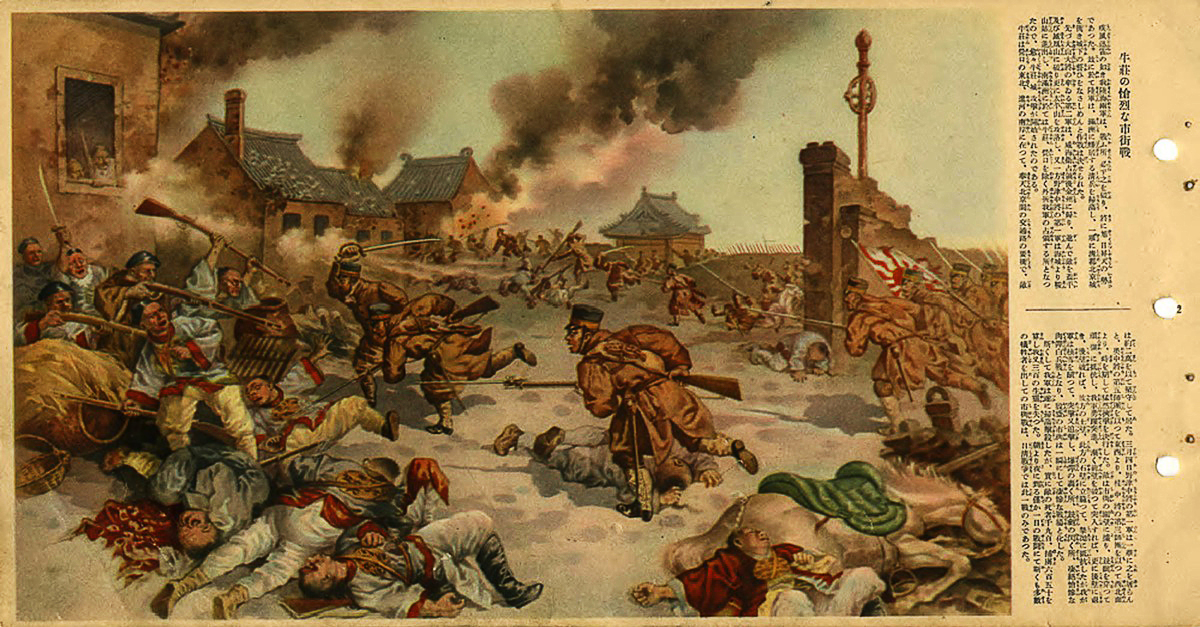
Qing troops facing defeat during the Battle of Yingkou 1895.

The Metropolitan Manchu Banner armies were also further subdivided but there are 2 differing accounts of the size and nature of the subdivision

Subdivisions of the Metropolitan Banners
Subdivisions of Zenone	Zenone's account	Esposito's account	Subdivisions of Esposito*
Paid division	28,800	67,000 (60,000 infantry)	Paid Division
Guards/flank	15,000	4,000	Flank
Vanguard	1,700	2,000	Vanguard
Light	2,000		
Imperial Guard	1,700	3,000	Imperial Guard
Gendarmerie	21,000	20,000	Foot force
Artillery and Musketry	6,200		
Peking Field Force	20,000	7,250 32 guns	Peking Field Force**
Total	96,400	103,250	

*In Esposito's account there was also 4,000 men of the Imperial Hunting establishment organised in a Tiger-Hunting battalion and operated as a shock force throughout the 19th century.

** In Esposito's account the Peking Field force was a unit where Bannermen were rotated through in order to receive modern training this being in addition to the core force of 7,250 the guns mentioned are also smoothbore guns.

During the period between the end of the Taiping Rebellion and the Beginning of the war the Qing government began a process of reform of the Green standard army. The Green Standard army was weak and scattered unable to mobilise men effectively as the payroll was inflated with non-existent soldiers and its soldiers were addicted to opium and gambling. The Qing government sought to recreate the Green Standard Army in a modern fashion with the creation of the 'Disciplined Forces' or lian-jun. The lian-jun drew their men from the Green Standard but operated more like the Braves of the Hunan and Anhui armies. From 1885 onwards frequent Imperial Edicts recommended the reform of the entire Green Standard Army into lian-jun however little progress was made. In 1894 the Imperial government dictated that the Green Standard was for policing duties and counter-bandit operations whilst the Braves were for fighting rebellions.

Li Hongzhang as Viceroy of Zhili oversaw the lian-jun process in the region and in Zhili the lian-jun were almost identical to the Huai army his personal army and were well-armed with modern equipment and trained by Huai army officers. In Zhili the lian-jun were organised into zhen lian-jun which were lesser quality and Haifang lianjun which were coastal defense troops and the more elite of the two. In 1885 Li had organised 7,000 Haifang and 15,500 Zhen lianjun.

The Qing government began a program of re-armament importing weaponry and producing its own weaponry in local arsenals in 1880 alone the Qing government imported 149 heavy and 275 field artillery pieces it also decided to import 26,000 Mauser 1871 rifles and standardise on this rifle in 1882 however this was never achieved. The Chinese government also purchased 151 Maxim guns between 1892 and 1895 and in 1890 the Tianjin arsenal was already producing maxim guns joined in 1892 by the Nanjing arsenal.

The estimates of the Board of Revenue and Board of War states that the effective strength of the Chinese army was 360,000 including the provincial militia, the defense army (the braves), the lian-jun and new style troops. The army during the war was slow to mobilise and move towards the fighting the lack of railways a key factor in this. Therefore, the fighting of the war fell almost entirely upon the forces already present in Manchuria Zhili and Shandong. The armies themselves were predominantly infantry and cavalry with artillery attached to the infantry with support services such as logistics, medical, engineer and signal not existing, hired labour conducted transportation of goods and basic engineering with some civilian workers who acred as quartermasters with some doctors at the rear. The supply of troops was generally left to the provinces in which they fought. This created a chaotic situation with some units being well-supplied with others being hardly supplied with ammunition being poorly distributed and this issue was only exacerbated by the lack of standardisation of weaponry amongst the soldiers. The government arsenals proved insufficient to support the entire Qing military and the government was forced to purchase equipment from abroad. The key issues of the Chinese military was the decentralised command, the lack of specialised formations, the lack of modern training and the shortage of modern weaponry. However, the worst weakness was the severe incompetence at a senior level with basic strategy and tactics completely lacking, the Chinese high command repeatedly used the same basic tactic of a passive defence fortifying a position only for the Japanese to flank the position and rout them

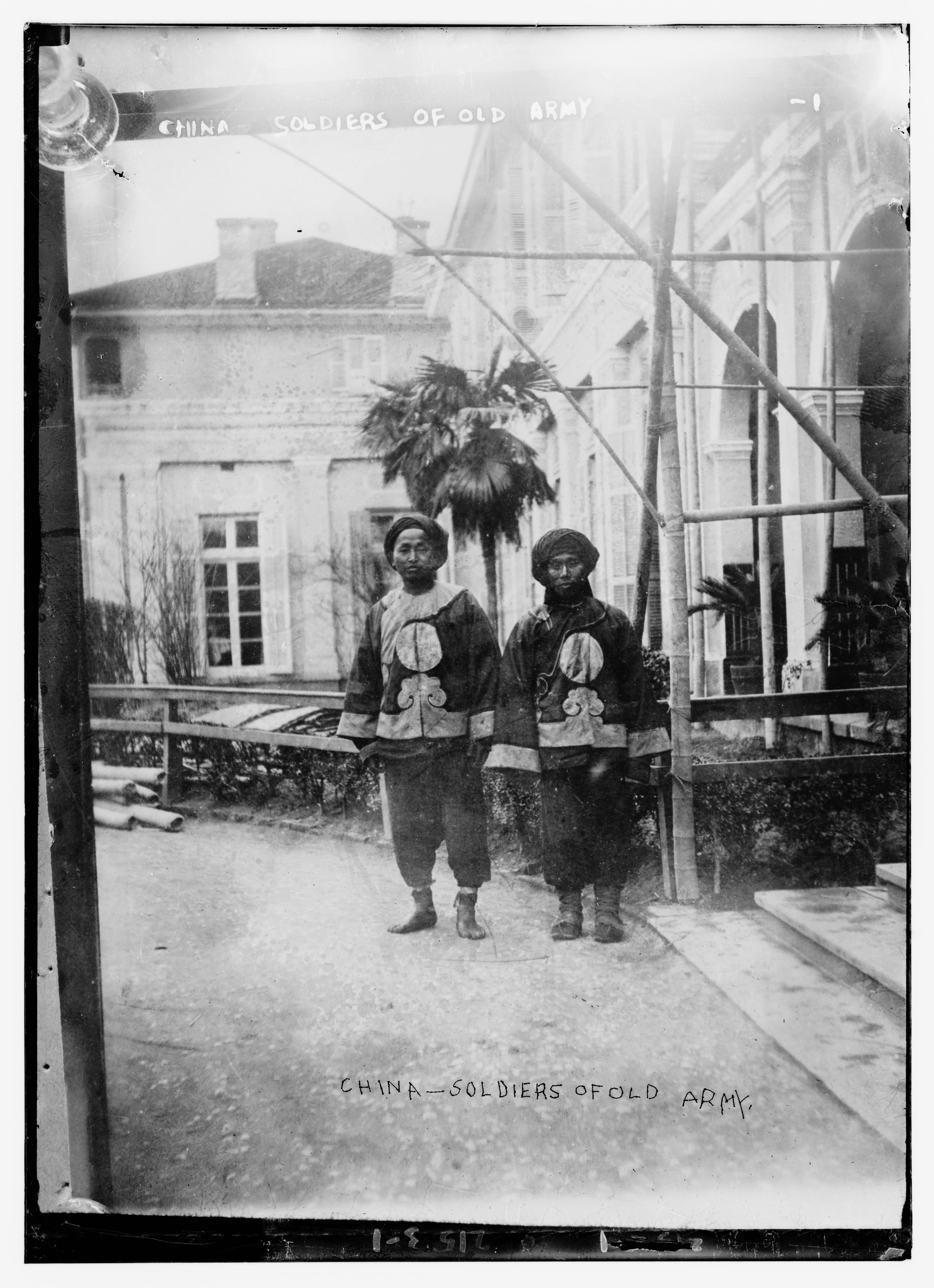
Green Standard troops in the 1900s.

== Late Qing armies ==
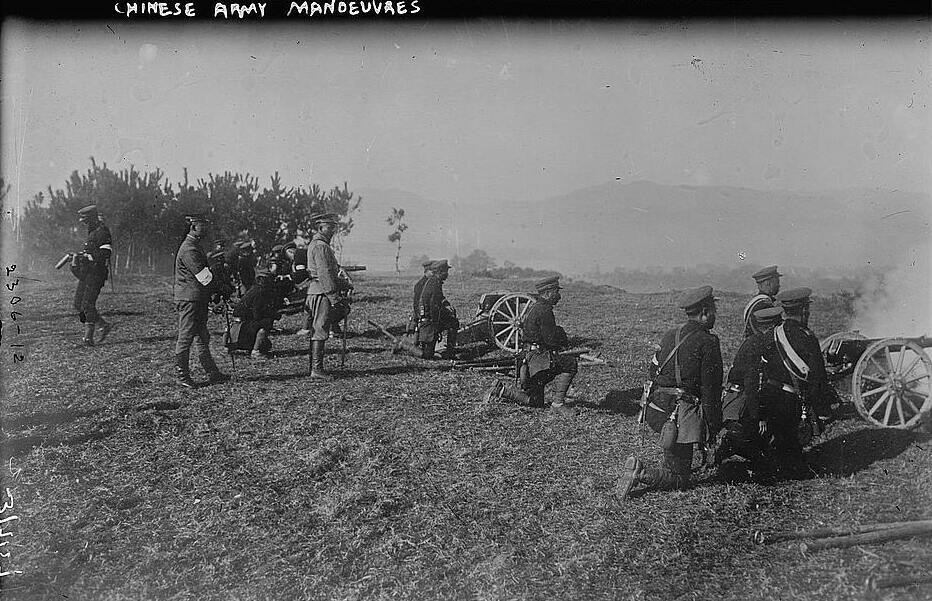
The Beiyang Army in conducting military exercises, 1910

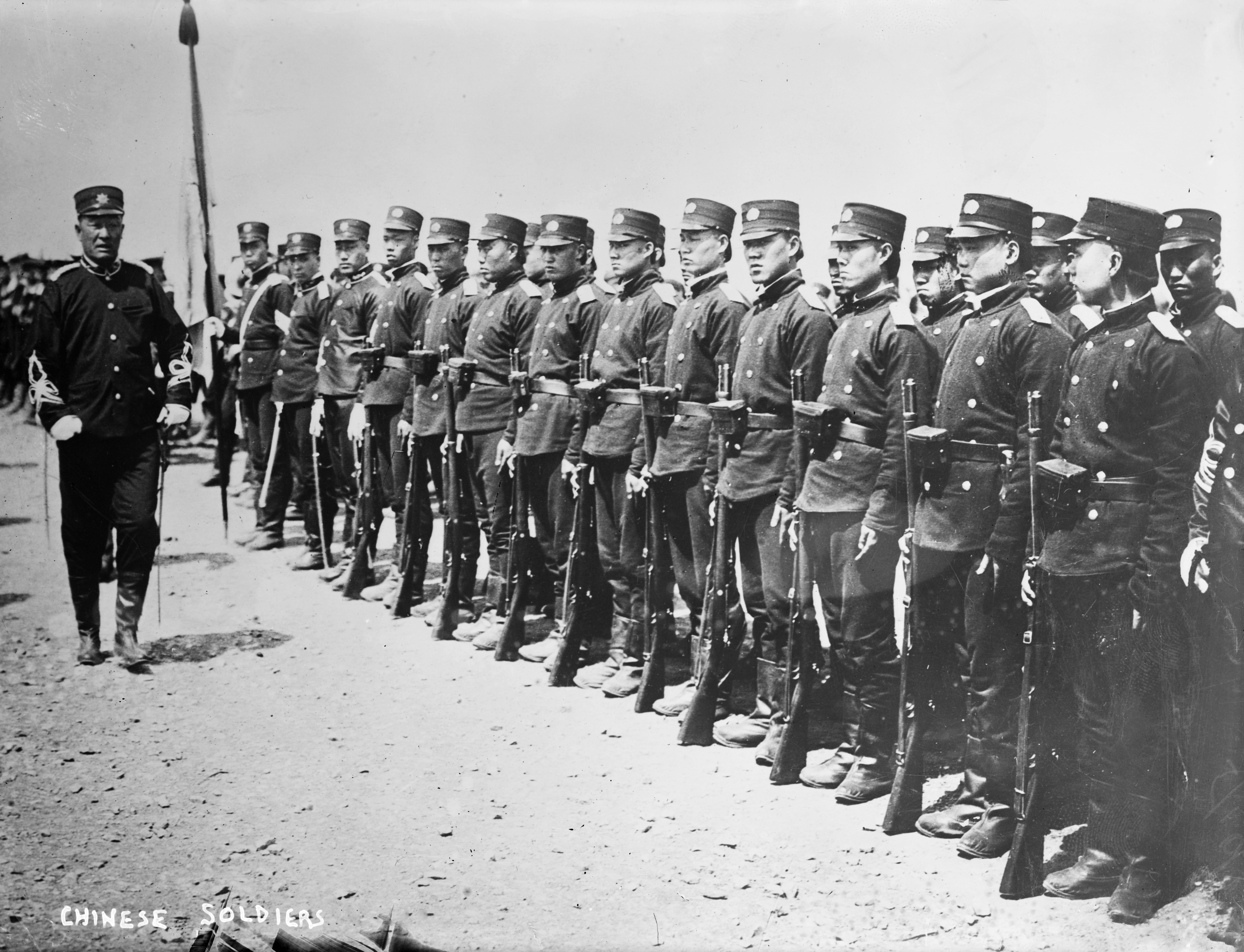
The Qing New Army in 1905

Losing the First Sino-Japanese War of 1894–1895 was a watershed for the Qing government. Japan, a country long regarded by the Chinese as little more than an upstart nation of pirates, had convincingly beaten its larger neighbour and in the process annihilated the Qing government's pride and joy — its modernized Beiyang Fleet, then deemed to be the strongest naval force in Asia. In doing so, Japan became the first Asian country to join the previously exclusively western ranks of colonial powers. The defeat was a rude awakening to the Qing court especially when set in the context that it occurred a mere three decades after the Meiji Restoration set a feudal Japan on course to emulate the Western nations in their economic and technological achievements. Finally, in December 1894, the Qing government took concrete steps to reform military institutions and to re-train selected units in westernized drills, tactics and weaponry. These units were collectively called the New Army. The most successful of these was the Beiyang Army under the overall supervision and control of a former Huai Army commander, General Yuan Shikai, who used his position to eventually become President of the Republic of China and attempted to be Emperor of China.

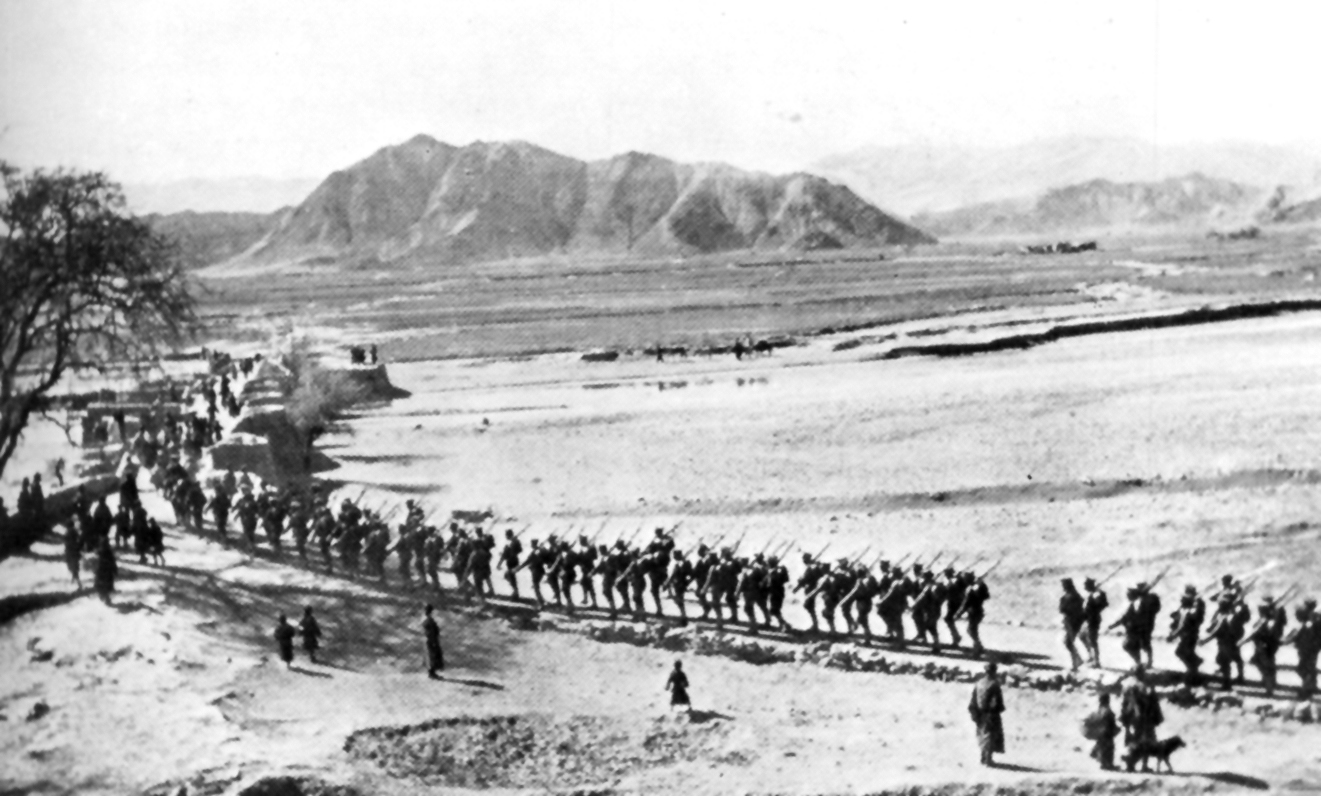
After the end of empire, Sichuan New Army leaving Lhasa in 1912.

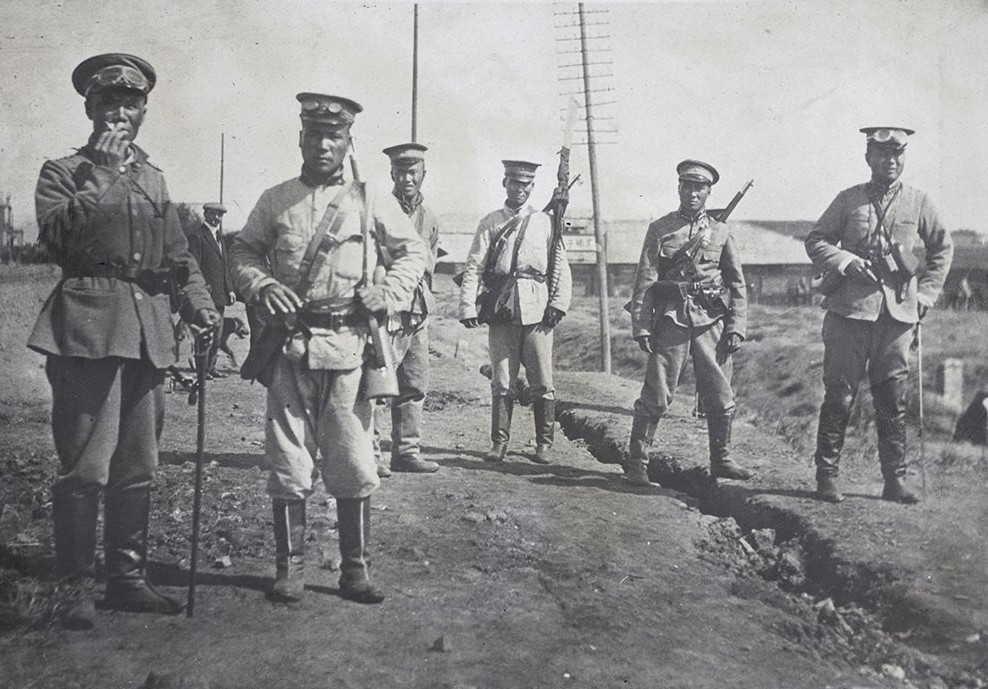
The Qing New Army in 1911

During the Boxer Rebellion, Imperial Chinese forces deployed a weapon called "electric mines" on June 15, at the river Hai River before the Battle of Dagu Forts (1900), to prevent the western Eight-Nation Alliance from sending ships to attack. This was reported by American military intelligence in the United States. War Dept. by the United States. Adjutant-General's Office. Military Information Division. Different Chinese armies were modernized to different degrees by the Qing dynasty. For example, during the Boxer Rebellion, in contrast to the Manchu and other Chinese soldiers who used arrows and bows, the Muslim Kansu Braves cavalry had the newest carbine rifles. The Muslim Kansu Braves used the weaponry to inflict numerous defeats upon western armies in the Boxer Rebellion, in the Battle of Langfang, and, numerous other engagements around Tianjin. The Times noted that "10,000 European troops were held in check by 15,000 Chinese braves". Chinese artillery fire caused a steady stream of casualties upon the western soldiers. During one engagement, heavy casualties were inflicted on the French and Japanese, and the British and Russians lost some men. Chinese artillerymen during the battle also learned how to use their German bought Krupp artillery accurately, outperforming European gunners. The Chinese artillery shells slammed right on target into the western armies military areas.

The military leaders and the armies formed in the late 19th century continued to dominate politics well into the 20th century. During what was called the Warlord Era (1916–1928) the late-Qing armies became rivals and fought among themselves and with new militarists.

The Qing dynasty in their last series of reforms formed the New army divided into the Lujun (regular army) and the Xunfangdui (reserve/provincial troops). The Lujun was divided into 3 formations the Changbei jun which consisted of 36 divisions with 12,512 men in peacetime and over 21,000 in wartime with a service term of 3 years. The Xubei jun or first reserve with 36 divisions of 9,840 men with a service term of 4 years. The Houbei jun 36 divisions each of 4,960 men with a service term of 4 years.

This gave a total army in wartime of 934,560 with 756,000 in 36 divisions of 21,512 (excluding camp followers) and 178,560 in 36 independent brigades.

The Xunfangdui were organised per province with each province allowed to maintain 5 units either of 3,010 infantry or 1,890 cavalry or a mix of the as long as there are no more than a combined total of 5 infantry and cavalry units. Therefore, the 22 provinces could field a potential maximum of 331,100 (if they fielded all infantry) or a minimum of 207,900. The Xunfangdui would act as a gendarmerie in peacetime and auxiliary units to field units in wartime.

=== Green Standard Army ===
The Green standard was reformed during the final decade of the dynasty it was divided into 75 groups each commanded by a Brigade-general with an additional 16 marine brigade-generals. Each brigade contained an unspecified number of regiments and each of these contained an unspecified amount of Ying (battalions) which each contained 500 infantry and 250 cavalry. If the Green standard conformed to the organisation of the Lujun each brigade contained 2 regiments which contained 3 battalions thus a brigade contained 6 battalions a paper strength of 3,000 infantry and 1,500 cavalry a total of 4,500, this would give a national total of 337,500 land troops and 72,000 marine troops (though marine troops were not marines in the traditional sense but also contained coastal defense troops and its cavalry was not mounted). This would give a total 273,000 infantry and 112,500 mounted cavalry and 24,000 unmounted cavalry.

== Qing Naval forces ==
The "sea ban" policy during the early Qing dynasty meant that the development of naval power stagnated. River and coastal naval defence was the responsibility of the waterborne units of the Green Standard Army, which were based at Jingkou (now Zhenjiang) and Hangzhou.

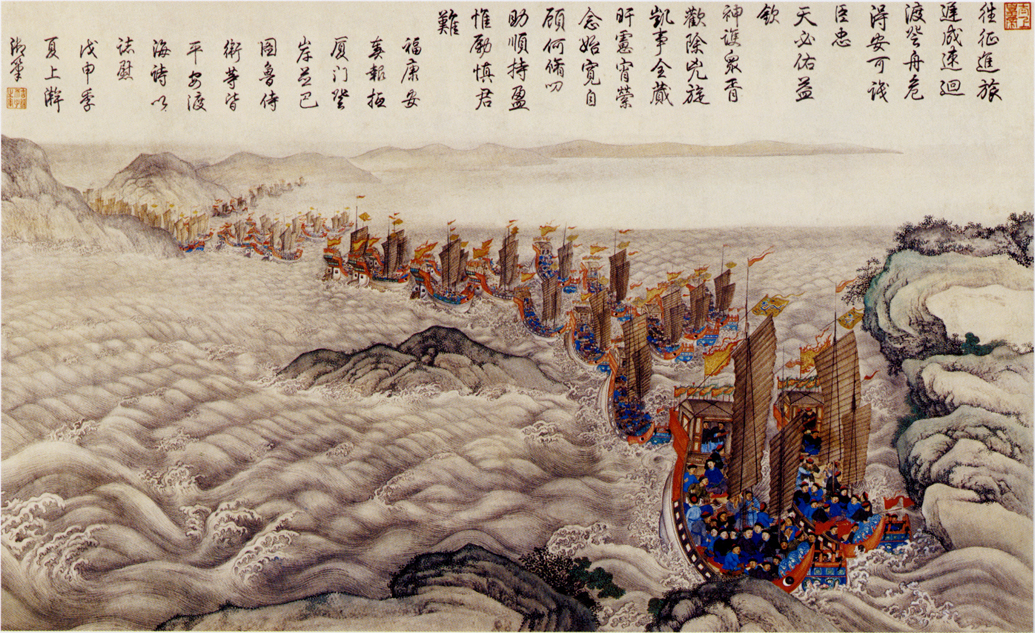
Fujian fleet in the Taiwan Strait

In 1661, a naval unit was established at Jilin to defend against Russian incursions into Manchuria. Naval units were also added to various banner garrisons subsequently, referred to collectively as the "Eight Banners Navy". In 1677, the Qing court re-established the Fujian Fleet in order to combat the Ming-loyalist Kingdom of Tungning based on Taiwan. This conflict culminated in the Qing victory at the Battle of Penghu in 1683 and the surrender of the Tungning shortly after the battle.

The Qing, like the Ming, placed considerable importance on the building of a strong navy. However unlike the Europeans, they did not perceive the need to dominate the open ocean and hence monopolise trade, and instead focused on defending, by means of patrols, their inner sea space. The Qing demarcated and controlled their inner seas in the same manner as land territory.

The Kangxi Emperor and his successors established a four-zone sea defence system consisting of the Bohai Gulf (Dengzhou fleet, Jiaozhou fleet, Lüshun fleet and Tianjin/Daigu fleet), Jiangsu-Zhejiang coast (Jiangnan fleet and Zhejiang fleet), Taiwan Strait (Fujian fleet) and the Guangdong coast (Guangdong Governor's fleet and Guangdong regular fleet). The fleets were supported by a chain of coastal artillery batteries along the coast and "water castles" or naval bases. Qing warships of the Kangxi era had a crew of 40 seamen and were armed with cannons and wall guns of Dutch design.

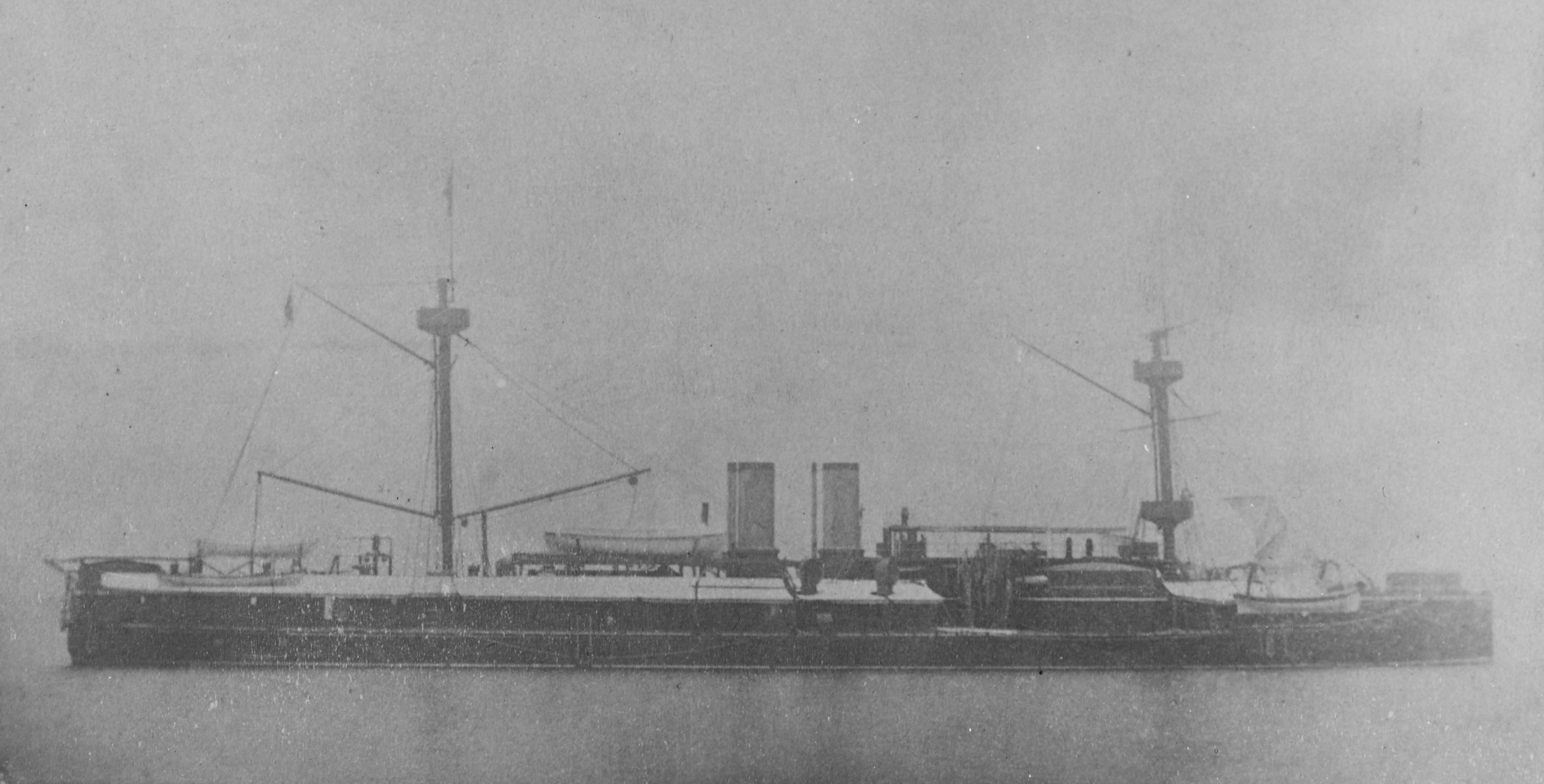
The Dingyuan, flagship of the Beiyang fleet

Although the Qing had invested in naval defences for their adjacent seas in earlier periods, after the death of the Qianlong Emperor in 1799, the navy decayed as more attention was directed to suppressing the Miao Rebellion and White Lotus Rebellion, which left the Qing treasury bankrupt. The remaining naval forces were badly overstretched, undermanned, underfunded and uncoordinated.

The Qing dynasty began building a modern steam navy with the construction of small gunboats in the 1870s. The navy was mainly organized into the Beiyang Fleet and the Nanyang Fleet, along with the smaller Fujian Fleet and the Guangdong Fleet. The Fujian Fleet was destroyed by the French Navy's Far East Squadron in 1884, during the Sino-French War over Vietnam. China acquired modern warships from Britain and Germany in the 1880s, but the powerful Beiyang Fleet was destroyed during the Sino-Japanese War by the Imperial Japanese Navy. China lost Port Arthur to Russia in 1898 and then Weihaiwei to Britain, leaving it without any base capable of hosting larger warships, and no effort was made to rebuild the navy until the reign of the Xuantong Emperor (1908–11).

The destruction of the navy in the Sino-Japanese War of 1894–95 left the country without a unified naval command structure. In July 1908, a Navy Commission was established to look into the rebuilding of the force, and in December 1910 it became the Ministry of the Navy. One of the first acts of the new ministry, headed by Zaixun, was to abolish regional fleets and create the post commander-in-chief of the navy, given to Admiral Sa Zhenbing, who had command over both arms of the navy – the sea-going fleet and the Yangtze River flotilla. By 1911 the sea-going fleet's main force consisted of four cruisers (one British-built Hai Qi-class cruiser and three German-built Hai Yung-class cruisers). Shortly before the 1911 Revolution, the Hai Chi went on a global tour that involved representing China at the coronation of King George V in London and visiting New York City and Havana. A Naval Guard Corps was also created to serve as a naval land force, but it was in the process of being formed by the time of the revolution.

== See also ==
- Baturu
- Chu Army
- Fujian Fleet
- Gansu Braves
- Gapsin Coup
- Great Hsi-Ku Arsenal
- Guangdong Fleet
- Hushenying
- Imo Incident
- Imperial Guards Brigade
- Jiangnan Daying
- Nanyang Fleet
- Nine Gates Infantry Commander
- Second rout of the Jiangnan Daying
- Shuishiying
- Wuwei Corps

== Works cited ==
- Crossley, Pamela Kyle (1990), Orphan Warriors: Three Manchu Generations and the End of the Qing World, Princeton, NJ: Princeton University Press, ISBN 0691055831.
- —— (1997), The Manchus, Oxford: Blackwell, ISBN 1557865604 (hardback), ISBN 0631235914 (paperback).
- —— (1999), A Translucent Mirror: History and Identity in Qing Imperial Ideology, Berkeley and Los Angeles: University of California Press, ISBN 0520215664.
- Dabringhaus, Sabine (2014). "The Ambans of Tibet—Imperial Rule at the Inner Asian Periphery". In Duindam, Jeroen; Dabringhaus, Sabine (eds.). The Dynastic Centre and the Provinces: Agents and Interactions. Leiden: Brill. ISBN 978-90-04-27209-5.
- Dreyer, Edward L. (2002), "Continuity and Change", in David A. Graff; Robin Higham (eds.), A Military History of China, Boulder, Colorado, and Oxford, England: Westview Press, pp. 19–38, ISBN 0813337364 (hardcover), ISBN 0813339901 (paperback).
- Elliott, Mark C. (2001), The Manchu Way: The Eight Banners and Ethnic Identity in Late Imperial China, Stanford: Stanford University Press, ISBN 978-1-134-36222-6.
- Elman, Benjamin A. (2005), On Their Own Terms: Science in China, 1550–1900, Cambridge, MA: Harvard University Press, ISBN 0674016858.
- Horowitz, Richard S. (2002), "Beyond the Marble Boat: The Transformation of the Chinese Military, 1850–1911", in David A. Graff; Robin Higham (eds.), A Military History of China, Boulder, Colorado, and Oxford, England: Westview Press, pp. 153–74, ISBN 0813337364 (hardcover), ISBN 0813339901 (paperback).
- Liu, Kwang-ching; Smith, Richard J. (1980). "The Military Challenge: The North-west and the Coast". In Fairbank, John K.; Liu, Kwang-Ching (eds.). The Cambridge History of China, Volume 11: Late Ch'ing 1800–1911, Part 2. Cambridge: Cambridge University Press. ISBN 978-0-521-22029-3..
- Lococo, Paul Jr. (2002), "The Qing Empire", in David A. Graff; Robin Higham (eds.), A Military History of China, Boulder, Colorado, and Oxford, England: Westview Press, pp. 115–33, ISBN 0813337364 (hardcover), ISBN 0813339901 (paperback).
- Roth Li, Gertraude (2002). "State Building Before 1644". In Peterson, Willard J. (ed.). The Cambridge History of China, Volume 9: The Ch'ing Empire to 1800, Part One. Cambridge: Cambridge University Press. pp. 9–72. ISBN 978-0-521-24334-6..
- Wakeman, Frederic (1985), The Great Enterprise: The Manchu Reconstruction of Imperial Order in Seventeenth-Century China, Berkeley, Los Angeles, and London: University of California Press, ISBN 0520048040. In two volumes.
- Waley-Cohen, Joanna (2006), The Culture of War in China: Empire and the Military under the Qing Dynasty, London: I.B. Tauris, International Library of War Studies, ISBN 1845111591.
- Wright, Mary C. (1957), The Last Stand of Chinese Conservatism: The T'ung-Chih Restoration, 1862–1874, Stanford, CA: Stanford University Press.
