= Shenjiying =

Chinese elite military unit of the Ming Dynasty

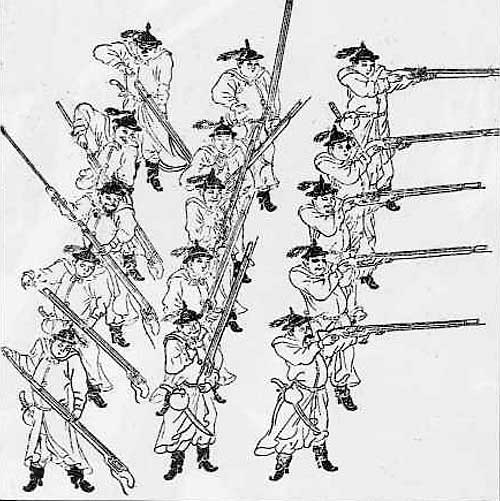
Ming musketeers. The Chinese military organized their musketeers in three ranks and utilize volley fire tactics, rank fire, countermarch volley, deep rank [5-8 ranks deep] simultaneous volley firing. General Qi Jiguang's musketeers emphasize accuracy and being well disiciplined.

The Shenjiying (simplified Chinese: 神机营; traditional Chinese: 神機營; pinyin: Shénjī Yíng; Wade–Giles: Shen-chi ying), which directly translates to "Divine Machine Battalion", was one of Ming dynasty's three elite military divisions stationed around Beijing collectively called the "Three Great Battalions" (三大營; Sān Dà Yíng), and was famous for its utilization of firearm weaponries. Its name has also been variously rendered as Firearms Division, Artillery Camp, Shen-chi Camp and Firearm Brigade.

Established during the reign of the Yongle Emperor (r. 1402–1424), the Divine Machine Battalion was specifically created to specialize in firearm warfare. Later on the division provided half of Qi Jiguang's army with firearms and one cannon to every twelve soldiers.

The other two elite brethren divisions around the capital were the Five Barracks Battalion (五軍營; Wǔjūn Yíng), which drilled infantry in tactical manoeuvres; and the Three Thousand Battalion (三千營; Sānqiān Yíng), which specialized in reconnaissance, mounted combat and signalling. Firearms equipped included the fire lance, fire arrows, volley guns, cannons and matchlock guns such as the arquebus.

During the Qing dynasty, which succeeded the Ming dynasty, the military division utilizing firearm weaponries was known as the Firearm Battalion (火器營; Huǒqì Yíng). There was also a military unit called Shenjiying during the Qing dynasty but was known in English as the Peking Field Force. It was created in 1862 during the reign of Tongzhi Emperor and put in charge of protecting the Forbidden City.

== See also ==
- Gunpowder weapons in the Ming dynasty
- Military of the Ming dynasty
- Military of the Qing dynasty
- Peking Field Force
- Firearm Battalion
