= Peking Field Force =

Qing dynasty Chinese military unit

- Active: 1862–1900
- Country: Qing Dynasty
- Branch: Imperial Guards Brigade
- Type: Field Force
- Role: Garrison
- Size: 3,000 (1862); 30,000 (1865)
- Garrison/HQ: Imperial City, Beijing
- Engagements: Boxer Rebellion: Battle of Peking

Peking Field Force
- Traditional Chinese: 神機營
- Simplified Chinese: 神机营
Transcriptions
Standard Mandarin
- Hanyu Pinyin: Shénjī yíng
- Wade–Giles: Shen^{2}-chi^{1} ying^{2}

The Peking Field Force was a modern-armed military unit that defended the Chinese imperial capital Beijing in the last decades of the Qing dynasty (1644–1912). Its troops were on duty in the Imperial City, Beijing, as one of the units of the Qing emperor's Imperial Guard.

The Force was founded in 1862, two years after the humiliating capture of Beijing and the sack of the Qing emperor's Summer Palace in 1860 by foreign powers at the end of the Second Opium War. After that war, high Qing officials like Zeng Guofan, Li Hongzhang, and Wenxiang (the latter a Manchu) tried to acquire advanced western weapons and to copy western military organization. Founded by Wenxiang and manned by mostly Manchu Bannermen, the soldiers most loyal to the dynasty, the Force was armed with Russian rifles and French cannon and drilled by British officers. The Field Force was one of the main units defending Beijing from the Eight Nation Alliance during the Boxer Rebellion in the summer of 1900, and it was destroyed by the heavy losses it took during the Western siege.

The "First Historical Archives of China" (中国第一历史档案馆) in Beijing hold a collection of primary documents on the Peking Field Force.

== Name ==
The Chinese name of the battalions is Shenji ying, in which shenji means "divine mechanism" and ying either "military camp", "battalion", or "regiment". The Qing force had the same name as the Shenjiying, a Ming-era (1368–1644) military corps that specialized in training with firearms. The Ming division has been variously referred to as "Divine Mechanism Battalions", "Firearms Division", "Artillery Camp", "Shen-chi Camp", and "Firearm Brigade". or "Divine Engine Division", whereas the Qing division that specialized in training with firearms has been referred to as the Firearm Battalion or "Huoqiying".

The Qing army corps also named "Shenji ying" is sometimes called the "Metropolitan Field Force", but is mostly known as the "Peking Field Force", the name by which foreigners referred to it in the late nineteenth and early twentieth centuries.

== History ==
The force was created in 1862 and consisted entirely of bannermen. Initially it was 3,000 men strong, although by 1865 it had grown to 30,000 men. The force had received western training and modern equipment during the period 1862–1865, though after that while it continued its existence further, modernisation had not occurred and it had been left to languish.

== See also ==
- Military of the Qing dynasty
- Imperial Guards (Qing dynasty)
- Firearm Battalion
- Hushenying

== Works cited ==
- Brunnert, H. S.; Hagelstrom, V. V. (1911). Present Day Political Organization of China. New York: Paragon.
- Chan, Hok-lam (1976). "Li Ying". Dictionary of Ming Biography, 1368–1644, Volume I. Stanford University: Stanford University Press. pp. 887–892. ISBN 0231038011.
- Chan, Hok-lam (1988). "The Chien-wen, Yung-lo, Hung-hsi, and Hsüan-te reigns, 1399–1435". In Mote, Frederick W.; Twitchett, Denis (eds.). The Cambridge History of China, Volume 7: The Ming Dynasty, 1368–1644, Part 1. Cambridge: Cambridge University Press. pp. 182–304. ISBN 978-0-521-24332-2.
- Crossley, Pamela Kyle (1990). Orphan Warriors: Three Manchu Generations and the End of the Qing World. Princeton, NJ: Princeton University Press. ISBN 0691055831.
- Dreyer, Edward L. (1982). Early Ming China: A Political History, 1355–1435. Stanford, CA: Stanford University Press. ISBN 0804711054.
- Hummel, Arthur W. Sr., ed. (1943). "I-hsin" . Eminent Chinese of the Ch'ing Period. United States Government Printing Office.
- Horowitz, Richard S. (1992). "Bannermen and Soldiers: Wenxiang and the Creation of the Peking Field Force (Shenji Ying), 1860–1866". Papers on Chinese History. 1 (1): 91–105.
- Horowitz, Richard S. (2002). "Beyond the Marble Boat: The Transformation of the Chinese Military, 1850–1911". In David A. Graff; Robin Higham (eds.). A Military History of China. Boulder, Colorado, and Oxford, England: Westview Press. pp. 153–74. ISBN 0813337364. (hardcover), ISBN 0813339901 (paperback).
- Hucker, Charles O. (1985). A Dictionary of Official Titles in Imperial China. Stanford: Stanford University Press. ISBN 0804711933..
- Liu, Kwang-ching; Smith, Richard J. (1980). "The Military Challenge: The North-west and the Coast". In Fairbank, John K.; Liu, Kwang-Ching (eds.). The Cambridge History of China, Volume 11: Late Ch'ing 1800–1911, Part 2. Cambridge: Cambridge University Press. ISBN 978-0-521-22029-3.
- Powell, Ralph L. (1955). The Rise of Chinese Military Power, 1895–1912. Princeton, NJ: Princeton University Press..
- Purcell, Victor (1963), The Boxer Uprising: A Background Study, Cambridge: Cambridge University Press, ISBN 9780521060066 (hardback). ISBN 9780521148122 (paperback).
- Rhoads, Edward (2000). Manchus & Han: Ethnic Relations and Political Power in Late Qing and Early Republican China, 1861–1928. Seattle and London: University of Washington press. ISBN 0295979380.
- Wright, Mary C. (1957). The Last Stand of Chinese Conservatism: The T'ung-Chih Restoration, 1862–1874. Stanford, CA: Stanford University Press.
