= Firearm Battalion =

Military unit

Coordinates: 39.965938°N 116.289058°E

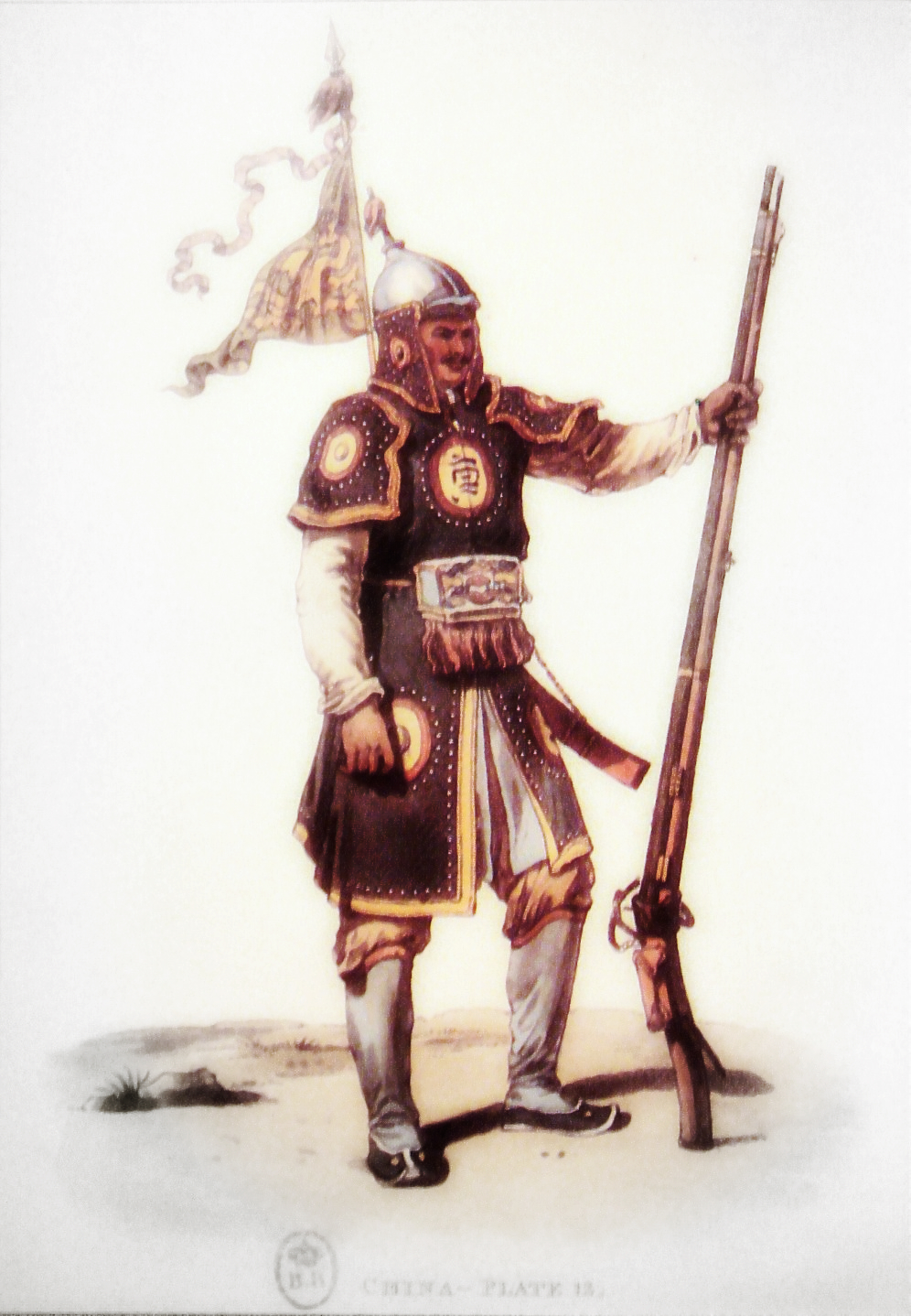
- 1793 painting of a Firearm Battalion musketeer
- Country: China
- Allegiance: Qing dynasty
- Branch: Eight Banners
- Type: Corps
- Role: Imperial Guards
- Garrison/HQ: Beijing
- Equipment: firearms, cannons

The Firearm Battalion or Huoqiying (simplified Chinese: 火器营; traditional Chinese: 火器營; pinyin: Huǒqì Yíng) was one of the elite military divisions of the Qing dynasty of China stationed around the capital Beijing. It was an army that specialized in managing and practicing firearm weaponries, and an elite unit of the Imperial Guards of the Qing dynasty. The former site of the Firearm Battalion ("Huoqiying") is located directly north of the Indigo Factory in the present-day Haidian District of Beijing, where "Huoqiying" remains as a place name today. There is also a Huoqiying station as a station of the Beijing Subway.

== History ==
The Firearm Battalion was first established in 1688 in Beijing during the reign of the Kangxi Emperor. It was initially called the "Han Army Firearms and Sword Training Camp"（Chinese: 汉军火器兼练大刀营). Three years later (1691) Kangxi Emperor felt the incomparable power of firearms and officially named it the "Firearm Battalion" (Huoqiying), as a special force that incorporated all the musket and cannon specialists previously subordinated to the Eight Banners. This organization consolidated under one command the different artillery units of the Eight Banners resident in Beijing, of the provincial Banner garrisons, and of the Green Standard forces in addition to professionalizing artillery as a separate military corps.

The role of the Firearm Battalion was similar to the Shenjiying of the Ming dynasty. The entire Firearm Battalion practiced firearms training, and the firearms they practiced include shotguns and large cannons. Composed of Eight Banners soldiers, it was responsible for guarding the imperial city. However, the battalion soldiers stationed in the city were stationed in the four cities of the city along with the Eight Banners soldiers. Each banner was equipped with a part of the Firearm Battalion soldiers, which was very inconvenient to train, and firearm manufacturing and training also required a large space.

In 1770, Qianlong Emperor approved that the Manchu Eight Banners officers and soldiers of the Firearm Battalion were moved outside the city and stationed in the same camp. The Firearm Battalion was built in the northwest suburb of Lindigo Factory outside the city. The Firearm Battalion area was built along the direction of the Kunyu River and was adjacent to the Summer Palace to the north. The building took three years and was completed in 1773. In order to distinguish it from the previous Firearm Battalion in the inner city, it was also called the "Outer Firearm Battalion".

The streets and lanes in the Firearm Battalion were in the shape of a checkerboard, and the large wall surrounding the camp was four kilometers long and made of three-piece earthen barriers. There was a river guarding the Firearm Battalion outside the Battalion wall, which played a role in drainage. The wall had four gates in the east, west, north and south, and there was a flat bridge with each gate.

== See also ==
- Military of the Qing dynasty
- Peking Field Force
- Shenjiying
- Hushenying
