= Imperial Guards (Qing dynasty) =

Qing dynasty military force defending the emperor

- 侍衛
- Active: 1644–1924
- Disbanded: 1912
- Country: China
- Allegiance: Emperor of China
- Type: Imperial guard Infantry
- Role: Close protection
- Garrison/HQ: Forbidden City, Beijing

Commanders
- Notable commanders: Zaitao; Zaifeng, Prince Chun

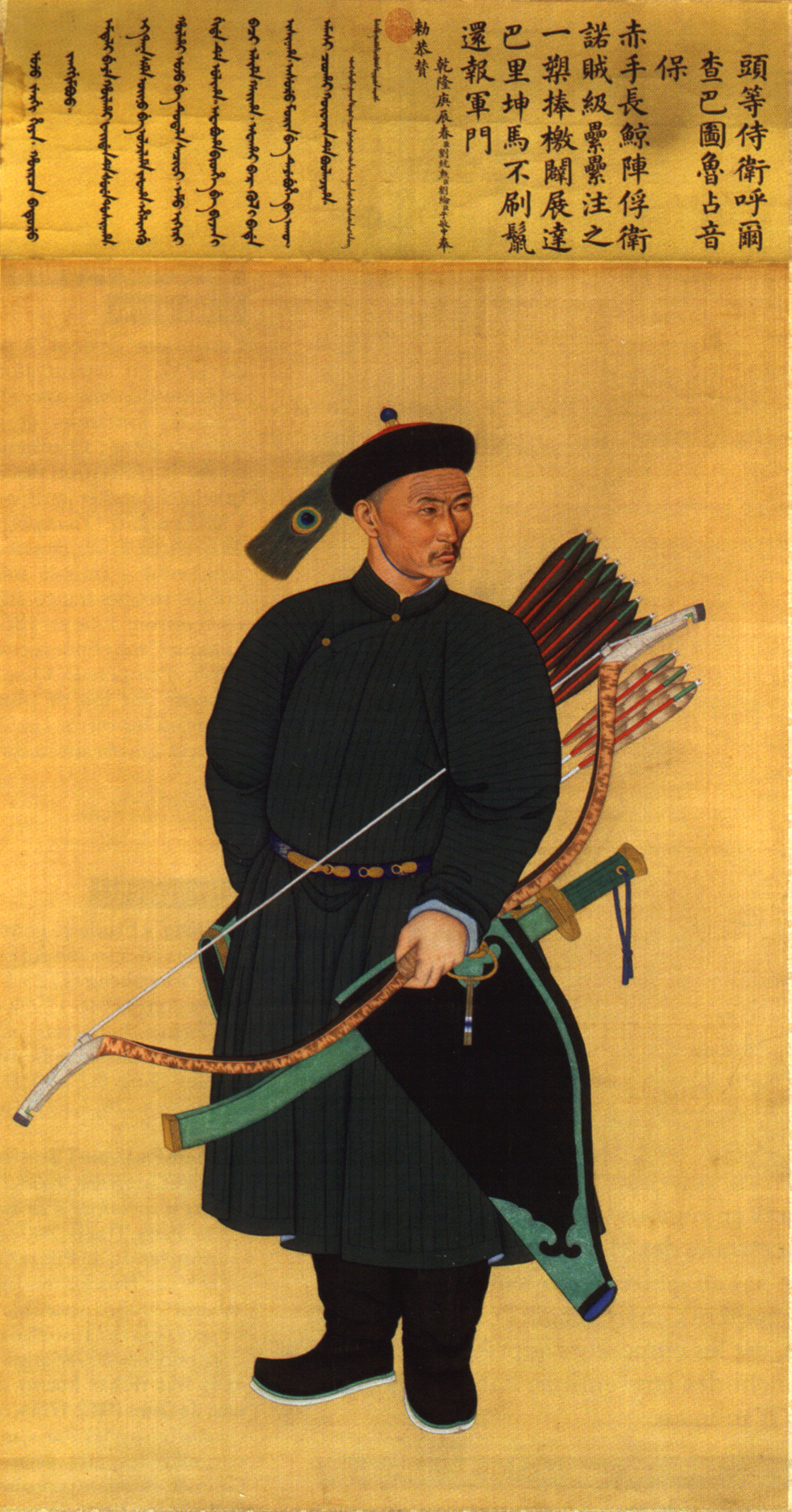
A guard from the late 1700s.

The Imperial Guards (Chinese: 侍衛; pinyin: shìwèi, Manchu: ᡥᡳᠶᠠ, romanized: hiya) of the Qing dynasty were a select detachment of Manchu and Mongol bannermen responsible for guarding the Forbidden City in Beijing, the emperor, and the emperor's family. For the majority of the dynasty's history, the Imperial Guards were divided into three groups: the Guard Corps, the Vanguard, and the Imperial Bodyguard.

The original Imperial Guards units were mostly destroyed by foreign troops during the Boxer Rebellion in 1900. During the late Qing military reform in the following decade, the Qing government established a new imperial guard formation as a regular military unit, the size of a division, and its training was overseen by Yuan Shikai's Beiyang Army.

The Qing imperial guards also practiced Shuai Jiao, a form of jacket wrestling.

== Guard Corps ==
The Guard Corps (Manchu: bayara; simplified Chinese: 护军; traditional Chinese: 護軍; pinyin: hùjūn) was assigned to protect the imperial palace. Soldiers from the Manchu and Mongol banners would be admitted to serve in the unit. The Guard corps was about ten times the size of the Vanguard and Imperial Bodyguards, and was the largest formation of the Imperial Guards.

== Vanguard ==
The Vanguard (Manchu: gabsihiyan; simplified Chinese: 前锋; traditional Chinese: 前鋒; pinyin: qiánfēng) corps was assigned to march ahead of the emperor when he left the palace. Soldiers from the Manchu and Mongol banners could join. The Vanguard consisted of about 1500 men.

== Imperial Bodyguard ==
The Imperial Bodyguard (Manchu: hiya; simplified Chinese: 领侍衛; traditional Chinese: 領侍衛; pinyin: lǐngshìwèi) corps was assigned to protect the emperor at all times. Only Manchu bannermen could join, and most members came from the upper three banners. Like the Vanguard, the Imperial Bodyguard consisted of about 1500 men.

== See also ==
- Embroidered Uniform Guard
- Firearm Battalion
- Imperial Guards (Tang dynasty)
- Manchukuo Imperial Guards
- Peking Field Force
- Shuai jiao
- Wu Chien-ch'uan
- Wu Quanyou
- Yang Luchan
