= Chinese-coined neologisms for Western concepts =

Chinese-coined neologisms for Western concepts (Chinese: 華製新漢語; pinyin: huázhì xīn hànyǔ) are newly coined Chinese words and older Chinese terms given new meanings that were developed in modern China to translate or denote Western concepts and objects. In this term, hànyǔ refers to Chinese vocabulary. Their creators included Western missionaries working in China and Chinese literati, and these terms are distinguished from modern Chinese-character neologisms coined in Japan under Western influence (和製新漢語; hézhì xīn hànyǔ; Japanese: wasei shinkango), which form a subset of Japanese-coined Chinese-character words.

This vocabulary accumulated gradually from the transition between the Ming and Qing dynasties onward, through the translation of Western learning and growing contact between China and the outside world. In the late Ming and early Qing periods, European Jesuits collaborated with Chinese scholar-officials to translate books, repurposing Classical Chinese words with new meanings or combining characters to render Western ideas. During the first half of the 19th century, Protestant missionaries compiled bilingual dictionaries and founded periodicals and published books in China's port cities and in Southeast Asia, while Chinese officials and gentry around the time of the Opium Wars organized translations and compilations on foreign history, geography, and law. From the 1860s onward, state-run institutions such as the Tongwen Guan in Beijing and the translation bureau of the Jiangnan Arsenal in Shanghai, along with treaty-port periodicals and modern-style schools, expanded the translation and circulation of Western works.

Translators absorbed foreign concepts through phonetic transliteration or by assigning new meanings to existing words, and they also formed new terms using Chinese word-formation patterns, including combining morphemes, replacing explanatory phrases with shorter translations, and deriving words with affix-like elements. These newly coined compounds also accelerated the shift of written Chinese toward multisyllabic vocabulary. When a Western concept was first introduced, multiple competing translations often circulated side by side; over time, as their meanings settled and as specialized glossaries and disciplinary nomenclature were compiled, these equivalents were gradually winnowed down or replaced.

In the mid-to-late 19th century, some Chinese translations of Western books and English–Chinese dictionaries reached Japan during the final years of the Tokugawa shogunate and the early Meiji era. Several of these translated terms were adopted into Japanese, sometimes with altered usage, and after the First Sino-Japanese War (1894–1895) flowed back into China through Chinese students studying in Japan and Chinese translations of Japanese books, contributing to a two-way exchange and semantic division of labor in modern East Asian vocabulary.

== Terminology ==
The scholar Hu Xinxiang uses the umbrella term jìndài xīn hànyǔ (近代新漢語, 'modern new Chinese-character words') for Chinese-character terms newly coined or given new meanings in modern China and Japan to express Western concepts. Within this framework, terms formed in China are called huázhì xīn hànyǔ (華製新漢語), such as 陪審 (péishěn, 'jury') and 化學 (huàxué, 'chemistry') as used by missionaries in China, in contrast to hézhì xīn hànyǔ (和製新漢語; Japanese: wasei shinkango) coined in Japan, such as 哲學 (zhéxué; Japanese: tetsugaku, 'philosophy'), coined by Nishi Amane. In English-language Japanese lexical studies, Patrycja Duc-Harada attests the Japanese reading kasei shinkango for this category, using it in a narrower sense for Chinese-coined terms introduced into Japanese.

Scholars also differ on how to classify Western-learning terms formed by semantic translation using existing Chinese morphemes: depending on the criteria adopted, such words are treated either as loanwords in a broad sense or as newly coined native Chinese words. Modern Chinese-character neologisms as a broader category have also been referred to in China as xīn míngcí (新名詞, 'new terms'), wénmíngcí (文明詞, 'civilization words'), and jìndài xīncí (近代新詞, 'modern neologisms').

== History ==
=== Ming and Qing Jesuit translations ===
A page from the 1607 woodblock edition of Elements (幾何原本), orally translated by Matteo Ricci and written down by Xu Guangqi.

From the late 16th to the 18th century, Catholic Jesuits traveled to China as missionaries, initiating a tradition of Sino-Western collaboration in translating and compiling works of Western learning. After 1580, during the Ming dynasty, Jesuits such as Michele Ruggieri and Matteo Ricci arrived in Macau. Catholic missionaries gradually entered mainland China and collaborated with Chinese scholar-officials including Xu Guangqi, Li Zhizao, and Wang Zheng to translate books. These translation activities continued until the Suppression of the Society of Jesus in 1773.

The collaborative method used at the time consisted of oral translation by a Western missionary paired with written transcription and polishing by a Chinese scholar. Representative works produced through this model include the first six books of Euclid's Elements (幾何原本, Jǐhé yuánběn, published in 1607), orally translated by Ricci and written down by Xu Guangqi; Mingli tan (名理探, 'Investigation of the Theory of Names', 1631), a work on Aristotelian logic orally translated by Francisco Furtado and written down by Li Zhizao; and Diagrams and Explanations of the Wonderful Machines of the Far West (1634 edition), a treatise on Western mechanical engineering dictated by Johann Schreck and translated and illustrated by Wang Zheng.

Some Jesuits also compiled and illustrated works introducing Western geography and scholarship, such as Ricci's world map Kunyu Wanguo Quantu (1602), as well as Giulio Aleni's Zhifang Waiji ('Record of Foreign Lands', 1623) and Xixue fan (西學凡, 'Summary of Western Learning', 1623). Among the translated terms from this period, words such as 赤道 (chìdào 'equator'), 地球 (dìqiú 'Earth'), 幾何 (jǐhé 'geometry'), and 對數 (duìshù 'logarithm') remained in use in later periods.

Alongside collaborations between missionaries and scholar-officials, Chinese writers during the late Ming and early Qing dynasty also recorded or named newly introduced Western instruments. For instance, the optical instrument maker Sun Yunqiu (孫雲球) used the term 察微鏡 (cháwēijìng 'microscope'), while Li Yu used 顯微鏡 (xiǎnwēijìng 'microscope') to describe a Western optical instrument in his short-story collection Twelve Towers (十二樓, Shí'èr lóu, prefaced in 1658). The term 顯微鏡 was later adopted in 19th-century Protestant missionary publications.

After the Qing court prohibited missionary activity in 1723, during the first year of the Yongzheng Emperor's reign, Catholic missionaries withdrew to Macau, except for a small number who remained in service at the Imperial Astronomical Bureau in Beijing. Collaborative translation of scientific texts between Chinese and Western scholars subsequently declined. In the Canton trade of this period, foreign merchants were required to conduct business through the Cohong, a guild of licensed Chinese merchant houses, while Chinese intermediaries such as compradors (買辦) and interpreters (通事, tōngshì) assisted in Sino-foreign dealings. At the same time, Qing authorities prohibited foreigners from learning Chinese and investigated Chinese subjects who taught the language to foreigners. During the first half of the 18th century, a Portuguese-based pidgin was used in Sino-foreign commercial dealings, after which Chinese Pidgin English spread in Guangzhou and later in the newly opened treaty ports.

Everyday English loanwords transliterated into Chinese, such as 巴士 (bāshì 'bus') and 三文治 (sānwénzhì 'sandwich'), entered Cantonese dialects through Chinese Pidgin English and later spread to other Chinese varieties and Mandarin Chinese. Existing Chinese vocabulary that appeared in coastal travel accounts and local Sino-foreign interactions was also adopted by 19th-century translators of Western books. For example, Hailu (海錄, 'Record of the Seas'), dictated by the sailor Xie Qinggao (謝清高), used 火船 (huǒchuán, literally 'fire ship') to refer to a steamboat, while the Ming writer Ye Quan's (葉權) You Lingnan ji (遊嶺南記) and local usage around Guangzhou and Macau used 黑奴 (hēinú) to refer to enslaved Black Africans. Both terms were subsequently adopted in the Chinese translations and writings of the Protestant missionary Karl Gützlaff.

=== Early and mid-19th-century port translations ===
Title page of the first part of Robert Morrison's A Dictionary of the Chinese Language (1815).

In 1807, Robert Morrison of the London Missionary Society arrived in Guangzhou, opening the era of Protestant missionary translations of Western learning in China. Because Qing restrictions on missionary activity remained in force, early Protestant missionaries, including Morrison, William Milne, Walter Henry Medhurst, Elijah Coleman Bridgman, Karl Gützlaff, and Samuel Wells Williams, initially operated mainly in Guangzhou, Macau, and overseas Chinese communities in Southeast Asia such as Malacca, Singapore, and Batavia.

To learn Chinese and spread the gospel, these missionaries actively compiled bilingual dictionaries, drawing on Ming and Qing Jesuit writings, classical Chinese texts, and the vocabulary of the Guangzhou and Macau ports. When compiling A Dictionary of the Chinese Language (華英字典, Huáyīng zìdiǎn, whose first volume was printed in Macau in 1815), Morrison consulted Elements, the Qing mathematical compendium Shuli jingyun (數理精蘊), and Chinese vernacular novels.

Several other bilingual dictionaries followed. The American missionary Samuel Wells Williams began compiling An English and Chinese Vocabulary, in the Court Dialect (英華韻府歷階, Yīnghuá yùnfǔ lìjiē) in 1843, and published it in Macau the following year. This English–Chinese dictionary was intended to help foreigners learn Chinese pronunciation, with entries arranged alphabetically in English. Around the same period and shortly afterward, Medhurst published his English and Chinese Dictionary (英華字典, 1847–1848), and Wilhelm Lobscheid published his English and Chinese Dictionary (英華字典, 1866–1869). According to Huang Heqing's analysis of neologisms in Williams's dictionary, terms recorded there such as 會議 (huìyì 'meeting' or 'conference'), 數學 (shùxué 'mathematics'), 首相 (shǒuxiàng 'prime minister'), 洗禮 (xǐlǐ 'baptism'), 耳膜 (ěrmó 'eardrum'), and 手套 (shǒutào 'gloves') also appeared in later dictionaries, translations, and other works, including 洗禮 in the 1848 Yinghuan Zhilüe and 耳膜 in the 1851 Quanti xinlun (全體新論, 'New Treatise on the Whole Body').

In addition to compiling dictionaries, early Protestant missionaries introduced Western history, geography, political institutions, and natural sciences through periodicals and monographs. Among periodicals, Morrison and Milne founded the Chinese Monthly Magazine (察世俗每月統記傳) in Malacca in 1815, and Gützlaff founded the Eastern Western Monthly Magazine in Guangzhou in 1833.

In his monographs and translations of the 1830s and 1840s, Gützlaff used many new terms, including 民族 (mínzú 'nation' or 'people') in Jiushizhu Yesu Jidu xingzhuan zhi yaolüe zhuan (救世主耶穌基督行傳之要略傳, 1834), 議會 (yìhuì 'parliament') and 商務 (shāngwù 'commerce') in Gujin wanguo gangjian (古今萬國綱鑑, 1838), 擔保會 (dānbǎohuì 'insurance company') in Maoyi tongzhi (貿易通志, 1840), and 長頸鹿 (chángjǐnglù 'giraffe') and 海溝 (hǎigōu, used to mean a narrow channel connecting two seas) in Wanguo dili quanji (萬國地理全集, c. 1843–1844). During the same period, Bridgman published Meilige Heshengguo zhilüe (美理哥合省國志略, 'Brief Account of the United States of America') in Singapore in 1838, introducing American history and geography; the book contained terms such as 貿易 (màoyì 'trade'), 文學 (wénxué 'literature'), 法律 (fǎlǜ 'law'), 火輪船 (huǒlúnchuán 'steamship'), and 公司 (gōngsī 'company', referring to the Dutch East India Company).

Frontier and coastal defense crises around the time of the First Opium War prompted Qing officials and statecraft scholars to sponsor the translation and compilation of Western works. In 1839, Imperial Commissioner Lin Zexu arrived in Guangzhou to suppress the opium trade. He assembled four translators proficient in foreign languages, including Yuan Dehui (袁德輝) and Liang Jinde (梁進德), to translate news from English-language periodicals such as The Canton Register and The Chinese Repository, and to compile Sizhou zhi (四洲志, 'Gazetteer of the Four Continents') from selected translations of the Scottish geographer Hugh Murray's Encyclopaedia of Geography. Separately, the American medical missionary Peter Parker and Yuan Dehui each translated excerpts from the Swiss jurist Emer de Vattel's The Law of Nations, which were later included in Illustrated Treatise on the Maritime Kingdoms under the title Geguo lüli (各國律例). In 1841, Lin Zexu handed his compiled materials to Wei Yuan, who combined them with earlier Ming and Qing Jesuit works and Chinese publications by Protestant missionaries such as Gützlaff and Bridgman to compile Illustrated Treatise on the Maritime Kingdoms (first prefaced in 1843, and expanded in several subsequent editions). Similarly, in 1843 Xu Jiyu met the American missionary David Abeel in Xiamen, collected Chinese-language books and maps produced by Westerners, and completed Yinghuan zhilüe ('A Short Account of the Maritime Circuit') in 1848. Through the printing of Illustrated Treatise on the Maritime Kingdoms and Yinghuan zhilüe, port and missionary translated terms such as 新聞紙 (xīnwénzhǐ 'newspaper'), 公司 (gōngsī 'company'), 國會 (guóhuì 'parliament', appearing in Sizhou zhi and Illustrated Treatise on the Maritime Kingdoms, whereas Xu Jiyu used 公會, gōnghuì, for the British Parliament), 火輪船 (huǒlúnchuán 'steamship'), and 鐵路 (tiělù 'railway') moved beyond the confines of the treaty ports, attracted attention among Chinese literati, and in some cases were transmitted to late Edo-period Japan.

After the signing of the Treaty of Nanking in 1842, missionary publishing and educational activities expanded into British Hong Kong and the five newly opened treaty ports, and by the early 1850s Shanghai had replaced Guangzhou as a major center for translating Western books. New Chinese periodicals were also launched: Medhurst and others founded Chinese Serial in Hong Kong in 1853, and Alexander Wylie and others founded the Shanghae Serial (六合叢談) in Shanghai in 1857. Alongside religious content, the latter carried articles on Western science, world geography, and British and American parliamentary systems, using terms such as 議院 (yìyuàn 'legislative assembly').

During the same decade, specialized books introducing Western medicine and natural philosophy (格致, gézhì) were published. The British medical missionary Benjamin Hobson released Quanti xinlun (1851) and Bowu xinbian (博物新編, 'New Compilation of Natural Philosophy', 1855, printed at the London Missionary Society Press in Shanghai), introducing anatomical and physiological terms such as 大腦 (dànǎo 'cerebrum') and 小腦 (xiǎonǎo 'cerebellum'), as well as chemical gas names such as 養氣 (yǎngqì 'oxygen'), 輕氣 (qīngqì 'hydrogen'), and 淡氣 (dànqì 'nitrogen'). At the same time, missionaries in Shanghai including Wylie, Joseph Edkins, and Alexander Williamson collaborated with the mathematician Li Shanlan and others to translate a series of scientific works: the remaining books of Euclid's Elements (續幾何原本, 1857), Zhongxue (重學, 'Mechanics'), Zhiwuxue (植物學, 'Botany', 1858), Daishuxue (代數學, 'Algebra'), and Daiweiji shiji (代微積拾級, 'Elements of Analytical Geometry and of the Differential and Integral Calculus', 1859). These translations not only used technical terms such as 微分 (wēifēn 'differential'), 積分 (jīfēn 'integral'), and 方程 (fāngchéng 'equation'), but also used or popularized disciplinary and scientific terms including 代數 (dàishù 'algebra', as in 代數學), 重學 (zhòngxué 'mechanics'), 植物學 (zhíwùxué 'botany'), and 細胞 (xìbāo 'cell').

=== Translation of Western learning by late Qing official bureaus ===
Volume 2 of Wanguo gongfa (萬國公法), published in Japan in 1871.

Following the end of the Second Opium War, the Qing court acted in 1861 on a memorial from Prince Gong (Yixin) and other officials to establish the Zongli Yamen, a central office for managing foreign affairs. In Shanghai, the scholar Feng Guifen advocated setting up schools in Shanghai and Guangzhou to train translators and study Western learning. In 1862, the Tongwen Guan (School of Combined Learning) was formally established in Beijing, and an imperial edict issued in 1863 provided the basis for founding similar language schools in Shanghai and Guangzhou. The Tongwen Guan hired foreign instructors, including the American missionary W. A. P. Martin and the French chemist Anatole Billequin, who worked with the school's teachers and students to translate roughly twenty Western works. These translations focused primarily on international law and foreign legal codes, alongside works on political economy and the natural sciences. Martin had already begun translating the American jurist Henry Wheaton's Elements of International Law into Chinese while in Shanghai; after the Zongli Yamen assigned four Chinese officials to assist him, the translation was published in Beijing in 1864 as Wanguo gongfa (萬國公法, 'Public Law of All Nations'). In 1868, the Tongwen Guan also printed Martin's natural science textbook Gewu rumen (格物入門, 'Introduction to Natural Philosophy'). These translations used and spread political and legal vocabulary, including 權利 (quánlì 'rights'), 主權 (zhǔquán 'sovereignty'), 特權 (tèquán 'privilege'), 自治 (zìzhì 'self-governance'), 公法 (gōngfǎ 'public law'), and 民主之國 (mínzhǔ zhī guó, used to translate 'republic'). In natural science education, they also introduced or continued to use disciplinary and technical terms such as 化學 (huàxué 'chemistry'), 力學 (lìxué 'mechanics'), 電學 (diànxué 'electricity'), and 電報 (diànbào 'telegraph').

Counterbalancing the Tongwen Guan in the north was the Translation Department of the Jiangnan Arsenal in Shanghai. Between 1861 and 1862, the Qing statesman Zeng Guofan had recruited the Chinese scientists Xu Shou and Hua Hengfang to the Anqing Arsenal. At the end of 1867, the Jiangnan Arsenal added a dedicated Translation Department, for which Hua Hengfang, Xu Shou, and Xu Jianyin took responsibility, and which was inaugurated in 1868. The department adopted a collaborative method in which Westerners, including the British translators John Fryer and Alexander Wylie and the Americans Carl Kreyer and Daniel Jerome Macgowan, interpreted texts orally, while Chinese scholars such as Xu Shou, Hua Hengfang, Zhao Yuanyi, and Jia Buwei wrote them down in Chinese. Over several decades, the department translated more than a hundred works, mainly specialized treatises on ordnance, mathematics, chemistry, mechanics, steam engines, geology, and medicine.

Confronted with conflicting translations of technical terms across different translators, Fryer worked during his tenure at the Translation Department to standardize terminology. In the 1880s, he compiled and published a series of bilingual specialized glossaries for mineralogy, chemistry, and materia medica to unify translated names. Beyond book translation, Fryer, Xu Shou, and others helped establish the Shanghai Polytechnic Institution (格致書院, Gezhi Shuyuan), and in 1876 Fryer founded the scientific periodical The Chinese Scientific and Industrial Magazine (格致彙編, Gezhi huibian), which published articles on new scientific knowledge and promoted the arsenal's translated books.

Qing envoys and travelling officials dispatched to Europe, the United States, and Japan during the Tongzhi and Guangxu reigns also expanded Chinese neologisms through diplomatic diaries and accounts of foreign politics and customs. Among missions to Europe and the United States, Binchun accompanied Robert Hart to Europe in 1866 and wrote Chengcha biji (乘槎筆記), while the Tongwen Guan student Zhang Deyi, who travelled with him, wrote Hanghai shuqi (航海述奇). Subsequently, Zhigang accompanied the Anson Burlingame mission in 1868, and at the end of 1876 Guo Songtao, China's first resident minister to Britain and France, set out for Britain and recorded his journey in Shixi jicheng (使西紀程). Among missions to Japan from the late 1870s to the early 1890s, China's first minister to Japan, He Ruzhang, wrote Shidong shulüe (使東述略), and his counsellor Huang Zunxian authored Riben guozhi (日本國志, 'Treatises on Japan'). Travelling officials Fu Yunlong and Huang Qingcheng, who visited Japan on investigative trips, wrote Youli Riben tujing yuji (游歷日本圖經餘紀) and Dongyou riji (東游日記), respectively. These diplomatic writings drew on existing translated terms from Illustrated Treatise on the Maritime Kingdoms, Yinghuan Zhilüe, Wanguo gongfa, and Gewu rumen. At the same time, when describing parliaments, judicial systems, postal and telegraph services, and expositions in the West and in Meiji-era Japan, their authors used various phonetic transliterations and self-coined terms, and also introduced some graphic loans from Japanese into Chinese writing.

=== Circulation through periodicals in the mid-to-late 19th century ===
In the mid-to-late 19th century, missionary periodicals, learned society publications, and commercial newspapers in the treaty ports formed a media network alongside the official translation bureaus for spreading Western learning, with close personnel overlap between newspaper editors and book translators. Among missionary and society publications, the American missionary Young John Allen founded the weekly Church News (教會新報, Jiaohui xinbao) in Shanghai in 1868 and reorganized it in 1874 as Wanguo Gongbao (A Review of the Times), which covered Western history, geography, politics, and scientific knowledge in addition to religious topics. In 1887, British and American merchants, diplomats, and missionaries founded the Society for the Diffusion of Christian and General Knowledge Among the Chinese in Shanghai. After Allen became its secretary in 1889, the society took over Wanguo Gongbao, which had ceased publication in 1883, and relaunched it as a monthly. Among commercial and independent newspapers, Shen Bao, launched in Shanghai in 1872 by the British businessman Ernest Major, and Tsun Wan Yat Po, founded in Hong Kong in 1874 by Wang Tao, regularly ran editorials and news columns on Self-Strengthening affairs, international events, and technological inventions, bringing Western learning to a broader urban readership in the port cities. As late Qing interest in Western learning expanded from science and technology to Western political and social issues, missionary periodicals such as Wanguo Gongbao and translated Western books together became key sources of Western knowledge for reformist thinkers including Kang Youwei, Liang Qichao, and Tan Sitong.

In 1896, Huang Zunxian and others founded the reformist political journal Shiwubao (時務報, The Chinese Progress) in Shanghai, inviting Liang Qichao to serve as chief editor. Beginning with its 13th issue in December 1896, the journal appended a bilingual glossary titled Zhongxiwen hebibiao (中西文合璧表) to match Chinese and Western proper names and technical terms. Between 1897 and 1898, reformers also launched vernacular newspapers, including Yanyi baihuabao (演義白話報, 1897) and Qiu Tingliang's Wuxi baihuabao (無錫白話報, 1898, later renamed Zhongguo guanyin baihuabao, 中國官音白話報, to indicate its use of Mandarin rather than the Wuxi dialect), in an effort to convey current affairs to general readers in vernacular Mandarin. Nationalist vernacular newspapers that emerged from 1903 onward subsequently brought new terms already found in classical-style periodicals, such as 國民 (guómín 'citizen'), 革命 (gémìng 'revolution'), and 教育 (jiàoyù 'education'), into vernacular journalism.

By the late 19th century, some Chinese scholars proficient in both Chinese and Western languages began moving away from the older collaborative model of oral interpretation by Westerners and written composition by Chinese, translating and writing directly from Western originals (though Lin Shu continued to rely on oral collaborators who knew foreign languages when translating Western novels). Among them was Yan Fu, a graduate of the Fuzhou Navy Yard school who had studied in Britain from 1877 to 1879. In 1898, Yan formally published Tianyanlun (天演論), an annotated translation of Thomas Henry Huxley's Evolution and Ethics, using an archaic classical prose style modeled on pre-Qin philosophers to expound the theory of natural selection. In translations such as Tianyanlun and Yuanfu (原富), he retained terms already established in 19th-century Chinese translations of Western books, including 化學 (huàxué 'chemistry'), 民主 (mínzhǔ 'democracy'), and 自由 (zìyóu 'freedom'), while Tianyanlun also used terms such as 天演 (tiānyǎn 'natural evolution') and 群學 (qúnxué 'sociology'). In the same year, Ma Jianzhong, who had studied in France, published Mashi Wentong, the first specialized grammar of Chinese written by a Chinese scholar on the model of Western grammatical systems.

Parallel to direct translation from Western books was a wave of translating Western learning through Japanese publications. Following the Qing defeat in the First Sino-Japanese War in 1895, the Zongli Yamen sent the first group of Chinese students to study in Japan in 1896, the Datong Translation Bureau (大同譯書局, Datong yishuju) was founded in Shanghai in 1897, and reformists fled into exile in Japan after the 1898 coup that ended the Hundred Days' Reform. Under these conditions, indirect translation of Western learning via Japanese expanded rapidly, and large numbers of Japanese graphic loans entered Chinese, competing and merging widely with the Chinese-coined translated terms that had taken shape in China during the 19th century.

== Word formation ==
From the late Ming to the late Qing dynasty, translators of Western learning frequently had to decide how to render Western concepts and objects that lacked Chinese equivalents: whether to use phonetic transcription (transliteration) or semantic translation that drew on the meaning-bearing capacity of Chinese characters. Because Chinese characters function as a logographic and morphosyllabic script, Chinese syllable structures are constrained, and pronunciations of the same characters vary across regional varieties of Chinese, purely polysyllabic transliterations tended to be lengthy and difficult to assimilate directly into the written language.

Robert Morrison argued that translations should align as closely as possible with the cultural background and habits of thought of Chinese readers. In a letter published in an 1838 annual report, Karl Gützlaff likewise opposed stilted translation and the overuse of phonetic transliteration. Zhuang Qinyong and Zhou Qinghai note that when Gützlaff transliterated the biblical name Eve as 夏娃 (Xiàwá), the two characters also evoked a Chinese woman's name. When John Fryer summarized his procedures for translating terminology in 1880, he listed transliteration into Mandarin as one method for coining new terms. By 1890, however, in an address to the missionary conference in Shanghai, he argued that transliteration should be used only as a last resort.

In practice, Chinese translations of Western books and English–Chinese dictionaries frequently adopted the strategy of repurposing existing words (舊詞新用, jiùcí xīnyòng), assigning new Western meanings to established Chinese vocabulary. Translators also combined existing Chinese morphemes, paired phonetic transcriptions with meaning-bearing characters (phono-semantic hybrids), coined groups of terms by analogy following a shared pattern, and even systematically created new specialized characters for chemical elements. In some fields, longer explanatory phrases gradually gave way to shorter compound words.

Surveying 19th-century written Chinese sources, Federico Masini classified neologisms and loanwords into six categories: phonemic loans (transliterations), hybrid loans (combining phonetic and semantic elements), calques (loan translations), semantic loans, Japanese graphic loans, and autochthonous neologisms, further dividing autochthonous neologisms into semantic neologisms and compositional neologisms.

The table below focuses on the five categories other than Japanese graphic loans, organized along three dimensions (phonetic and phono-semantic formation, assigning new meanings to existing words, and recombining morphemes), with additional examples drawn from related scholarship:

Masini's classification of 19th-century Chinese neologisms and loanwords
Dimension	Masini's category	Word-formation method and relation to the foreign source term	Representative examples
Phonetic and phono-semantic formation	Phonemic loans (transliterations)	Directly imitate the pronunciation of the foreign source term, with some translators also choosing characters that carry suggestive literal associations	夏娃 (Xiàwá, 'Eve'): Zhuang Qinyong and Zhou Qinghai note that when Gützlaff transliterated this Hebrew biblical name, he paired the Chinese surname 夏 (Xià) with 娃 (wá), a character suggestive of a female given name
Phonetic and phono-semantic formation	Hybrid loans	Combine a phonetic transcription with a Chinese character indicating the semantic category, usually placed at the end. Masini notes that apart from words ending in 教 (-jiào, 'religion'), 國 (-guó, 'country'), or 人 (-rén, 'person'), such hybrids were relatively rare	Masini cites 基督教 (Jīdūjiào, 'Christianity'), 巴厘滿衙門 (Bālímǎn yámén, 'parliament'), 必耳酒 (bì'ěrjiǔ, 'beer'), and 來夫大炮 (láifū dàpào, 'rifled cannon'); Huang Heqing also notes that An English and Chinese Vocabulary, in the Court Dialect combined the transliterated 基督 (Jīdū, 'Christ') with 徒 (tú, 'follower') to form 基督徒 (Jīdūtú) for Christians
Existing words given new meanings	Semantic loans	Retain an existing Chinese word form and add a new meaning modeled on the semantic pattern of the foreign source term	For specific mechanisms and examples, see the section "Existing words with new meanings" below
Existing words given new meanings	Autochthonous neologisms: semantic neologisms	Retain an existing Chinese word form, but extend it to a new meaning independently rather than following the semantic pattern of the foreign source term	For specific mechanisms and examples, see the section "Existing words with new meanings" below
Recombination of morphemes	Calques (loan translations)	Translate the constituent morphemes or syntactic structure of the foreign source term element by element, with varying degrees of correspondence	新聞紙 (xīnwénzhǐ, calqued on English newspaper); 鐵路 (tiělù, 'railway', which Masini considers most likely calqued on German Eisenbahn, whereas Wang Li traced it to French chemin de fer or English)
Recombination of morphemes	Autochthonous neologisms: compositional neologisms	Formed independently of the foreign word's structure by selecting and combining characters according to the nature, appearance, or function of the referent	化學 (huàxué, 'chemistry', literally 'study of transformation'); Masini also cites 自行車 (zìxíngchē, 'bicycle', literally 'self-moving vehicle') and 飛機 (fēijī, 'airplane', literally 'flying machine')

=== Existing words with new meanings ===
Repurposing existing words involved drawing on established Chinese terms and infusing them with foreign concepts. This approach allowed translators to express unfamiliar ideas through familiar vocabulary, though the older traditional associations of a word could sometimes cause ambiguity. Masini distinguishes two types according to how the new meaning arose: when a new meaning was added to an existing word following the semantic pattern of the foreign source term, he classifies it as a semantic loan; when a translator independently assigned a new meaning without following the foreign word's semantic pattern, he classifies it as a semantic neologism.

This practice spanned many domains of knowledge, from late Ming and early Qing translations in astronomy, geography, education, and mathematics to 19th-century English–Chinese dictionary entries covering calendars, tools and weapons, religion, and political institutions. In engineering and technology, traditional names for mechanical devices were likewise extended to Western-style equipment.

Examining how existing words acquired new meanings in Samuel Wells Williams's An English and Chinese Vocabulary, in the Court Dialect, Huang Heqing analyzes 22 repurposed terms and identifies three main types of change: the most common is semantic shift, in which an older Chinese word is used to denote a comparable or related Western referent; a second is narrowing of meaning, in which a formerly broad concept is restricted to a specific translation equivalent; and a third is word-class conversion, such as converting a verb into a noun. In addition, some political and legal terms underwent a reinterpretation of their internal grammatical structure in the course of borrowing.

Main mechanisms for assigning new meanings to existing words and extending older terms to Western learning
Mechanism of change or borrowing	Domain	Translated term	Traditional Chinese origin	New meaning in translations of Western learning
Semantic shift	Astronomy and geography	赤道 (chìdào), 南極 (nánjí), 北極 (běijí)	Traditional Chinese astronomical terms	Transferred by late Ming Jesuits to terrestrial geographical concepts ('equator', 'South Pole', 'North Pole')
Semantic shift	Education	大學 (dàxué, along with the related term 中學, zhōngxué)	大學 had various older meanings in Classical Chinese	Used by Giulio Aleni and others in Zhifang Waiji to refer to Western institutions of higher learning ('university'), alongside 中學 for Western secondary schools
Semantic shift	Mathematics	數學 (shùxué)	Originally referred to the traditional numerological arts	Used by late Ming Jesuits to mean arithmetic (as in Johann Schreck's 1631 Cetian yueshuo, 測天約說), and in the 19th century used by Williams in An English and Chinese Vocabulary, in the Court Dialect to translate the English mathematics
Semantic shift	Calendar	元旦 (yuándàn)	Originally referred to the first day of the first month of the traditional Chinese calendar	Used by Williams in An English and Chinese Vocabulary, in the Court Dialect to translate the first day of the Western New Year
Semantic shift	Everyday objects and weaponry	手鎗 (shǒuqiāng)	Originally referred to a short pointed weapon	Used by Williams in An English and Chinese Vocabulary, in the Court Dialect to translate the Western firearm pistol (listed as the second equivalent after 對面笑, duìmiànxiào)
Semantic shift	Religion	極樂園 (jílèyuán)	A Buddhist term (previously used by Morrison for the Buddhist Pure Land of Ultimate Bliss)	Adopted in Williams's An English and Chinese Vocabulary, in the Court Dialect for the Christian Paradise
Semantic shift	Politics and nobility	首相 (shǒuxiàng); 公 (gōng), 侯 (hóu), 伯 (bó), 子 (zǐ), 男 (nán) / 公爵 (gōngjué), 侯爵 (hóujué), 伯爵 (bójué), 子爵 (zǐjué), 五爵 (wǔjué)	Ancient Chinese title for the chief chancellor, and the five traditional ranks of nobility (公, 侯, 伯, 子, 男)	Transferred to translate the head of a modern European cabinet ('prime minister', 首相) and European ranks of nobility. For noble ranks, William Milne and Gützlaff used the single characters 公, 侯, 伯, 子, and 男; alongside these single characters, Williams's An English and Chinese Vocabulary, in the Court Dialect also recorded two-character equivalents such as 公爵, 侯爵, 伯爵, and 子爵, and used 五爵 collectively for the five ranks
Retention or near-synonymous reuse of older terms	Mathematics	方程 (fāngchéng), 微分 (wēifēn), 積分 (jīfēn)	方程 was a traditional Chinese mathematical term; older Chinese mathematics also had usages similar to 微分 and 積分	In the 1850s, Li Shanlan and Alexander Wylie retained 方程 ('equation') and used 微分 ('differential') and 積分 ('integral') when co-translating Daiweiji shiji (代微積拾級) and other works (their co-translation Daishuxue, 代數學, published the same year, also used 代數, dàishù 'algebra', which Masini classifies as an autochthonous neologism). Citing Joseph Needham, Masini notes that it remains unclear whether Li Shanlan was aware of the older mathematical usages resembling 微分 and 積分
Extension of older names to Western equipment	Engineering and technology	機械 (jīxiè), 機器 (jīqì)	機械 appears in pre-Qin texts such as the Zhuangzi (describing a well-sweep) and Han Feizi; 機器 appears in Song and Ming texts and in the late Ming Yuanxi qiqi tushuo (遠西奇器圖說) for ingenious devices	Zhang Baichun notes that by the Ming–Qing transition, indigenous Chinese terms for implements were already applied to Western artillery and other equipment; in the mid-19th century, Ding Gongchen used 機械 for agricultural implements and mechanical devices in vehicles and ships in much the same sense as its classical meaning, while translators such as Li Shanlan and officials of the Self-Strengthening Movement used 機器 for Western machinery
Narrowing of meaning	Natural history and zoology	昆蟲 (kūnchóng)	A general term for insects, worms, and similar small creatures in classical Chinese texts	Williams used 昆蟲論 (kūnchónglùn) to translate entomology in An English and Chinese Vocabulary, in the Court Dialect; Huang Heqing argues that 昆蟲 here refers to six-legged arthropods, a narrower scope than its earlier general meaning
Narrowing of meaning	Human classification	黑人 (hēirén)	Originally a general term for dark-skinned people	Huang Heqing notes that in Williams's An English and Chinese Vocabulary, in the Court Dialect, where it translates negro, this historical translation meaning narrowed to refer specifically to Black people of African descent
Word-class conversion or reanalysis of internal grammatical structure	Politics and commerce	會議 (huìyì), 經紀 (jīngjì)	會議 was originally a verb meaning 'to assemble and discuss'; 經紀 was originally a verb meaning 'to manage trade'	Verb-to-noun conversion. Huang Heqing notes that in An English and Chinese Vocabulary, in the Court Dialect, both terms were used as nouns to translate conference and broker, respectively
Word-class conversion or reanalysis of internal grammatical structure	Trade	進口 (jìnkǒu), 出口 (chūkǒu)	Originally nouns denoting entry and exit	Noun-to-verb conversion. Masini explains their verbal use for importing and exporting goods as a conversion from the original nouns
Word-class conversion or reanalysis of internal grammatical structure	Politics and law	民主 (mínzhǔ)	Attested early in the Book of Documents and Zuo Zhuan, originally meaning 'lord of the people' (monarch)	Semantic shift and grammatical reanalysis. Xiong Yuezhi examines how 民主 shifted in the late Qing from its traditional meaning of 'monarch' to 'rule by the people'; from a morphological perspective, Masini notes that in translating democracy, 民主 was reanalyzed from a modifier–head construction ('lord of the people') to a subject–predicate construction ('the people are masters')
Word-class conversion or reanalysis of internal grammatical structure	Politics and law	總統 (zǒngtǒng)	Originally used in the Book of Han as a verb meaning 'to oversee' or 'to hold overall command', and in the Qing military system for a commanding officer	Word-class conversion and abbreviation or blending. In its use to translate the American president, Xiong Yuezhi views 總統 as combining verb-to-noun conversion with abbreviation from 總統領 (zǒngtǒnglǐng); Masini notes its earlier Qing military sense and suggests that 總統領 may itself have been a blend of 總統 and 統領 (tǒnglǐng)

=== Compounding ===
In addition to repurposing existing words, translators frequently combined Chinese morphemes to form new disyllabic or polysyllabic compounds. These neologisms included both calques modeled on the morphological structure of foreign terms and newly coined compounds created independently by translators selecting and pairing Chinese characters without following a foreign model.

Modifier–head compounds consist of a modifying element and a head word, which supplies the compound's basic meaning. For example, 耳膜 (ěrmó 'eardrum') uses 耳 (ěr 'ear') to specify the anatomical location of the head word 膜 (mó 'membrane'). In this attributive modifier–head pattern (定語＋中心詞, dìngyǔ + zhōngxīncí), the head word indicates the broad category while the preceding modifier specifies its location, form, or function. Huang Heqing notes that this method of word formation can generally be explained in terms of the logical principle of genus (the class concept) plus differentia (the distinguishing feature); for instance, 袋鼠 (dàishǔ 'kangaroo', literally 'pouch-rat') and 企鵝 (qǐ'é 'penguin', literally 'standing-goose') borrow 鼠 ('rat') and 鵝 ('goose') as analogous categories and add a defining trait. Alongside attributive modifier–head compounds, morpheme compounding also encompassed adverbial modifier–head structures, in which an adverbial modifies a verbal head, as well as subject–predicate structures composed of a topic and a predicate. In addition, modern botanical translations drew on everyday morphemes to form specialized anatomical terms.

Regarding the distribution of compound structures across different periods, Federico Masini cites earlier research by Wang Li showing that before the 19th century, about 70 to 80 percent of disyllabic Chinese compounds were coordinate compounds (聯合結構, liánhé jiégòu) combining synonymous or near-synonymous morphemes, such as 兄弟 (xiōngdì 'brothers'). In Masini's sample of 19th-century disyllabic neologisms, however, coordinate compounds accounted for only about 10 percent, while modifier–head compounds made up more than half.

Huang Heqing also compared four sets of missionary neologisms and found that modifier–head compounds and repurposed existing words together accounted for the overwhelming majority in every case. In the corpora he analyzed from Matteo Ricci (77 terms), Giulio Aleni (18 terms), and Robert Morrison (204 terms), modifier–head compounds formed the largest group (about 57 to 78 percent), followed by repurposed existing words (about 22 to 36 percent). Only in the 44 neologisms from Samuel Wells Williams's An English and Chinese Vocabulary, in the Court Dialect (英華韻府歷階) did repurposed existing words (22 terms, 50 percent) outnumber modifier–head compounds (19 terms, 43.2 percent) to take the largest share.

Internal structures of morpheme compounding
Internal structure or category	Word-formation rationale	Foreign source term	Chinese translation	Morpheme analysis
Modifier–head (attributive + head)	Location feature + tissue category	tympanum	耳膜 (ěrmó)	In Williams's An English and Chinese Vocabulary, in the Court Dialect, 膜 (mó 'membrane') marks the tissue category and 耳 (ěr 'ear') specifies its anatomical location. Huang Heqing views Wilhelm Lobscheid's later translation 耳之鼓膜 (ěr zhī gǔmó) as an expanded transitional form between 耳膜 and 鼓膜 (gǔmó 'tympanic membrane').
Modifier–head (attributive + head)	Action feature + ceremony category	baptism	洗禮 (xǐlǐ)	Morrison had previously used the archaic character 祓 (fú) for the noun baptism and the verb–object phrases 付洗 (fùxǐ 'to administer washing') and 領洗 (lǐngxǐ 'to receive washing') for the verb baptise. In An English and Chinese Vocabulary, in the Court Dialect, Williams combined the modifier 洗 (xǐ 'wash') with the head word 禮 (lǐ 'rite') to indicate a ceremony, forming 洗禮.
Modifier–head (attributive + head)	Appearance or behavioral feature + analogous head (morphological analogy rather than biological taxonomy)	kangaroo	袋鼠 (dàishǔ)	In An English and Chinese Vocabulary, in the Court Dialect, Williams used 鼠 (shǔ 'rat') as an analogous category and selected its pouch (袋, dài) as the modifier.
Modifier–head (attributive + head)	Appearance or behavioral feature + analogous head (morphological analogy rather than biological taxonomy)	penguin	企鵝 (qǐ'é)	In An English and Chinese Vocabulary, in the Court Dialect, Williams used 鵝 (é 'goose') as an analogous category and 企 (qǐ) as the modifier. Huang Heqing suggests that 企 may take its original meaning 'to stand' (as in the dictionary's entry "Stand, 站、企、立、竚"); he also relays Xu Yuhang's view that 企 may be a phonetic loan character for the Cantonese and Min Chinese dialectal word whose etymological character is 徛 ('to stand').
Modifier–head (attributive + head)	Appearance or behavioral feature + analogous head (morphological analogy rather than biological taxonomy)	pitcher plant	豬籠草 (zhūlóngcǎo)	Recorded in Williams's An English and Chinese Vocabulary, in the Court Dialect. Huang Heqing suggests that it likens the plant's insect-trapping pitcher to a woven bamboo pig basket (豬籠, zhūlóng), paired with the category word 草 (cǎo 'grass' or 'plant').
Modifier–head (attributive + head)	Other attributive modifier–head examples	Everyday and institutional items	手套 (shǒutào 'gloves'), 番茄 (fānqié 'tomato'), 肥料 (féiliào 'fertilizer'), 翻譯官 (fānyìguān 'official interpreter')	Listed by Huang Heqing as examples of modifier–head neologisms in Williams's An English and Chinese Vocabulary, in the Court Dialect.
Modifier–head (adverbial + head)	Adverbial modifying a verbal head	exotic (in the translation 外來種, wàiláizhǒng)	外來 (wàilái 'foreign' or 'coming from outside')	Recorded in Williams's An English and Chinese Vocabulary, in the Court Dialect. Huang Heqing analyzes it as an adverbial modifier 外 ('outside') plus the head 來 ('to come'), suggesting that whereas classical Chinese used unlexicalized phrases such as 由外來, 自外來, and 從外來 ('coming from outside'), 外來 here fused into a fixed word.
Subject–predicate (grouped under "other" in Huang Heqing's statistics)	Topic + predicate	decimal (in the translation 十進之數, shíjìn zhī shù 'decimal numbers')	十進 (shíjìn)	Among the three "other" neologisms in An English and Chinese Vocabulary, in the Court Dialect outside modifier–head compounds and repurposed existing words, Huang Heqing analyzes 十進 ('carrying one to the next place for every ten') as a subject–predicate construction, contrasting it with the unlexicalized phrase 以十進位作一 in the Qing-dynasty scholar Hu Xu's Zhouyi hanshu yuecun (周易函書約存).
Other (Huang Heqing's statistical category)	Neologisms outside modifier–head compounds and repurposed existing words	builder (translated as 承建者, chéngjiànzhě), publish	承建 (chéngjiàn 'to undertake construction'), 刊發 (kānfā 'to publish')	The other two neologisms placed by Huang Heqing in the "other" category from An English and Chinese Vocabulary, in the Court Dialect.
Everyday morpheme combinations	Everyday morphemes combined into specialist terms	Botanical anatomical terms	子房 (zǐfáng 'ovary'), 心皮 (xīnpí 'carpel'), 胚珠 (pēizhū 'ovule')	Early botanical translations retained traditional monosyllabic Chinese words such as 根 ('root'), 葉 ('leaf'), 花 ('flower'), and 果 ('fruit'). In addition, Zhiwuxue (植物學, 'Botany'), co-translated by Li Shanlan, Alexander Williamson, and Joseph Edkins and published in 1858, combined everyday morphemes to coin disyllabic terms such as 子房, 心皮, and 胚珠 that remain in use in modern botany.

=== From explanatory phrases to shorter terms ===
During the early phase of Western learning's introduction to China, many new concepts had no ready equivalents in Chinese. While coining compound words, missionary works of the first half of the 19th century also sometimes relied on longer explanatory phrases or glosses to convey the original meaning. Shen Guowei notes that when Robert Morrison compiled A Dictionary of the Chinese Language (華英字典), he recognized that modern Western botany and traditional Chinese bencao (本草, materia medica) belonged to different systems of knowledge; rather than borrowing 本草 directly, he rendered botany with the explanatory phrase 樹草花之總理 ('general principles of trees, grasses, and flowers'). In the English–Chinese part of the same dictionary, Morrison similarly rendered liberty as 自主之理 ('the principle of self-rule') and democracy with the pejorative gloss 既不可無人統率亦不可多人亂管 ('neither should there be no one to lead, nor should many people govern in disorder'). By the time Elijah Coleman Bridgman published his Cantonese reader Chinese Chrestomathy in the Canton Dialect in 1841, sections on subjects such as geography and medicine (including human anatomy) presented English, Chinese, and Cantonese phonetic transcriptions in parallel columns, with explanatory phrases and compound words appearing side by side.

When John Fryer summarized the translation methods of the Jiangnan Arsenal in 1880, he listed "Invent a descriptive term using as few characters as possible" as one method for coining technical terms. Wang Yangzong cites related examples including 氧氣 (yǎngqì 'oxygen'), 輕氣 (qīngqì 'hydrogen'), 火輪船 (huǒlúnchuán 'steamship'), and 風雨表 (fēngyǔbiǎo 'barometer').

The shift from longer phrases to shorter terms is also visible in the retention or omission of the structural particle 之 (zhī). Early translators combining a disyllabic stem with 學 (xué 'study' or 'science') often formed four-syllable modifier–head phrases such as 幾何之學 (jǐhé zhī xué 'the study of geometry'). Although three-syllable discipline names without 之, such as 植物學 (zhíwùxué 'botany') and later 地質學 (dìzhìxué 'geology'), appeared from the late 1850s, Masini observes that the "-zhī xué" (－之學) pattern persisted until the end of the 19th century: Zhigang still wrote 天文之學 ('astronomy') in 1872, and Yan Fu used 動物之學 ('zoology') rather than the Japanese loanword 動物學 (dòngwùxué) in his 1898 translation Tianyanlun (天演論, from Thomas Henry Huxley's Evolution and Ethics).

Another development was the shifting balance between trisyllabic and disyllabic forms. In early missionary writings, Zhuang Qinyong and Zhou Qinghai point out that Karl Gützlaff, in his 1835 Shifei lüelun (是非略論), shortened Morrison's earlier 水蒸船 (shuǐzhēngchuán 'steamship') to the disyllabic 蒸船 (zhēngchuán). Masini cites several pairs of trisyllabic and disyllabic terms from his corpus. He cautions that because first-attestation dates in surviving texts are not absolute, one cannot assume in every case whether a trisyllabic form was shortened to a disyllabic one or a disyllabic form was expanded into a trisyllabic one. Over time, however, after a period of coexistence, the disyllabic forms generally prevailed, aligning with Chinese morphological preferences.

Evolution of 19th-century trisyllabic and disyllabic translated terms
Referent	Trisyllabic form	Disyllabic form	Notes on development
Steamship	水蒸船 (shuǐzhēngchuán, used earlier by Morrison)	蒸船 (zhēngchuán, 1835, Karl Gützlaff, Shifei lüelun)	Zhuang Qinyong and Zhou Qinghai note that Gützlaff shortened 水蒸船 to the disyllabic 蒸船.
Steamship	火輪船 (huǒlúnchuán, 1838)	火船 (huǒchuán, 1838), 輪船 (lúnchuán, omitting the first character)	All drawn from Masini's corpus. These six pairs display three chronological patterns of attestation: trisyllabic and disyllabic forms attested in the same year, the trisyllabic form attested earlier, and the disyllabic form attested earlier.
Steam train	火輪車 (huǒlúnchē, 1838)	火車 (huǒchē, 1838)	All drawn from Masini's corpus. These six pairs display three chronological patterns of attestation: trisyllabic and disyllabic forms attested in the same year, the trisyllabic form attested earlier, and the disyllabic form attested earlier.
Telegraph	電氣報 (diànqìbào, 1877)	電報 (diànbào, 1868)	All drawn from Masini's corpus. These six pairs display three chronological patterns of attestation: trisyllabic and disyllabic forms attested in the same year, the trisyllabic form attested earlier, and the disyllabic form attested earlier.
Electric lamp	電氣燈 (diànqìdēng, 1866)	電燈 (diàndēng, 1868)	All drawn from Masini's corpus. These six pairs display three chronological patterns of attestation: trisyllabic and disyllabic forms attested in the same year, the trisyllabic form attested earlier, and the disyllabic form attested earlier.
Electrical machine / electric engine	電氣機 (diànqìjī, 1866)	電機 (diànjī, 1866)	All drawn from Masini's corpus. These six pairs display three chronological patterns of attestation: trisyllabic and disyllabic forms attested in the same year, the trisyllabic form attested earlier, and the disyllabic form attested earlier.
Electric wire	電氣線 (diànqìxiàn, 1866)	電線 (diànxiàn, 1868)	All drawn from Masini's corpus. These six pairs display three chronological patterns of attestation: trisyllabic and disyllabic forms attested in the same year, the trisyllabic form attested earlier, and the disyllabic form attested earlier.

=== Affix-like elements and analogical word families ===
Beyond coining terms one by one, translators also placed fixed characters at the beginning or end of words so that they functioned much like prefixes or suffixes (known as affix-like elements, or affixoids). Following the principle of coining related terms by analogy, they produced whole groups of linked terminology, expanding isolated translated words into systematic word families for objects and academic disciplines. The table below lists several types of affix-like formations and analogical word families in 19th-century Chinese:

Examples of affix-like formations and analogical word families in 19th-century translated terms
Word-formation or analogical method	Representative morpheme	Word-formation function	Examples of derived word families
Prefix-like morphemes marking foreign origin	洋- (yáng-, 'foreign/overseas'), 西- (xī-, 'Western')	Prefixed to nominal roots to mark foreign objects or goods	洋煙 (yángyān, 'foreign tobacco' or opium), 洋布 (yángbù, 'foreign cloth'), and similar terms
Suffix-like morphemes grouping academic disciplines and mechanical devices	-學 (-xué, 'study of')	A highly productive 19th-century affix-like element for academic disciplines, forming both disyllabic discipline names and trisyllabic terms attached to disyllabic stems	Disyllabic terms in Federico Masini's appendix of 19th-century neologisms, such as 化學 (huàxué, 'chemistry'), 光學 (guāngxué, 'optics'), 聲學 (shēngxué, 'acoustics'), and 電學 (diànxué, 'electricity'), along with 重學 (zhòngxué, 'mechanics'), which retained the older name from the 1634 Yuanxi qiqi tushuo (遠西奇器圖說, Diagrams and Explanations of the Wonderful Machines of the Far West); trisyllabic terms such as 植物學 (zhíwùxué, 'botany') and 地質學 (dìzhìxué, 'geology')
Suffix-like morphemes grouping academic disciplines and mechanical devices	-機 (-jī, 'machine'; contrasted with traditional -車 -chē and -器 -qì)	Traditional Chinese nomenclature commonly used -車 (-chē, 'wheel/cart') for devices with rotating parts (such as 水車 shuǐchē, 'waterwheel', and 紡車 fǎngchē, 'spinning wheel') and -器 (-qì, 'implement/instrument') for tools and apparatus (such as 水器 shuǐqì, 'water implement', and 墾田器 kěntiánqì, 'land-reclamation implement'), while traditional textile apparatus also used -機 (-jī, 'loom/mechanism', as in 花機 huājī, 'drawloom', and 腰機 yāojī, 'backstrap loom'); from the mid-19th century onward, -機 became much more common for naming Western-style machinery	火輪機 (huǒlúnjī, 'steam engine') in Zhongxue (重學, Mechanics); 氣機 (qìjī, 'steam engine') cited by Zhang Baichun; 織機 (zhījī, 'weaving machine') and 火機 (huǒjī, 'steam engine') in Zhigang's 1872 Chushi Taixi ji (初使太西記, Record of the First Mission to the Far West); 電機 (diànjī, 'electrical machine') in Binchun (1866) and Wanguo Gongbao (1898)
Consistent final morpheme for terms in the same category	-數 (-shù, translating number)	Principle summarized by John Fryer at the 1890 Shanghai Missionary Conference: terms within the same disciplinary category should be named with a consistent head morpheme	Having adopted 數 (shù) for number, translators derived 分數 (fēnshù, 'fraction'), 根數 (gēnshù, 'root'), 乘數 (chéngshù, 'factor'), and 倍數 (bèishù, 'multiple'); on this basis, Fryer argued that prime number should also be renamed with -數 rather than 數根 (shùgēn)
Characteristic morpheme naming members of a group	袋- (dài-, 'pouch')	Combines the characteristic morpheme 袋 (dài, 'pouch') with different animal terms to form a word family for marsupials	Samuel Wells Williams coined 袋鼠 (dàishǔ, 'kangaroo', literally 'pouch rat') in An English and Chinese Vocabulary, in the Court Dialect (英華韻府歷階); Huang Heqing suggests that 袋獸 (dàishòu, 'marsupial', literally 'pouch beast'), used twelve years later by William Muirhead, was likely inspired by 袋鼠, after which Chinese successively coined further marsupial names such as 袋熊 (dàixióng, 'wombat') and 袋狼 (dàiláng, 'thylacine')

=== Systematic character creation for chemical elements ===
Beyond polysyllabic compounds, when 19th-century translators confronted chemical elements, basic terms that needed to be combined frequently, they also developed a single-character approach that borrowed rare existing characters or coined new dedicated ones. In the late 1860s, W. A. P. Martin in Gewu rumen (格物入門, Introduction to Natural Philosophy, 1868) and Wilhelm Lobscheid in his English and Chinese Dictionary (英華字典, with Part IV published in 1869) experimented respectively with disyllabic terms and with enclosing characters inside the outer frame of 行 (xíng); Lobscheid explained this method in the preface to Part IV. By 1871, Xu Shou and John Fryer, in Volume 1, Section 29 ("Huazi mingming", 華字命名, 'Naming in Chinese Characters') of Huaxue jianyuan (化學鑑原, Principles of Chemistry), published by the Jiangnan Arsenal, established a single-character naming system classified by radicals and mostly linked to Western pronunciations.

When naming elements, Xu Shou and John Fryer retained traditional Chinese single-character names for known substances and kept some disyllabic names for gases, while assigning a single Chinese character to most elements whose old names were unsuitable or that had been newly discovered in the West: if an existing rare character could be borrowed, it was given a new chemical meaning; if not, a new dedicated character was coined. In graphical structure, these dedicated characters used semantic components (radicals) to distinguish an element's category and physical state: metals took the 金 ('metal') radical, nonmetals mostly took the 石 ('stone') radical, and a liquid element such as 溴 (xiù, 'bromine') took the 水 ('water') radical. For pronunciation, newly coined characters with the 金 and 石 radicals usually took the first syllable of the element's Western name (or the second syllable when the first was inconvenient) and used a Chinese character with a similar Mandarin pronunciation as the phonetic component. By contrast, 溴 was formed by adding the 水 radical to 臭 (chòu, 'pungent/foul-smelling'), rather than representing the Western pronunciation phonetically. In addition, Wang Yangzong, summarizing Fryer's 1880 report, cites the 石-radical character 𥑢 as the translated character for boron.

With these single-character element names, Huaxue jianyuan could string element names directly together and, when needed, append numerals to indicate combining proportions, creating a formula-like compositional notation for translating inorganic compounds.

Naming system for chemical elements and inorganic compounds in Huaxue jianyuan (1871)
Naming category	Semantic component / word-formation rule	Naming principle	Examples
Previously known indigenous elements	Retained traditional Chinese single characters	No new characters coined	金 ('gold'), 銀 ('silver'), 銅 ('copper'), 鐵 ('iron'), 鉛 ('lead'), 錫 ('tin'), 汞 ('mercury'), 硫 ('sulfur'), 燐 ('phosphorus'), 炭 ('carbon')
Gaseous elements	Retained disyllabic -氣 (-qì, 'gas') names (omitting 氣 in certain compound names)	Retained descriptive translations coined by Benjamin Hobson, or added 氣 to an existing character	Retained translations such as 養氣 (yǎngqì, modern 氧 'oxygen'), 輕氣 (qīngqì, modern 氫 'hydrogen'), and 淡氣 (dànqì, modern 氮 'nitrogen'), as well as 綠氣 (lǜqì, modern 氯 'chlorine') and 弗氣 (fúqì, modern 氟 'fluorine'), formed by adding 氣 to existing characters; modern Chinese names for gaseous elements instead use single characters with the 气 radical: 氧, 氫, 氮, 氯, 氟
金-radical characters (borrowed rare characters or newly coined phono-semantic characters)	Added the 金 (釒) radical	Newly coined characters mostly used a phonetic component approximating the Mandarin pronunciation of the first syllable of the Western name (or the second syllable when inconvenient)	鈉 ('sodium'), 鈣 ('calcium'), 鎂 ('magnesium'), 鋁 ('aluminum'), 錳 ('manganese'); at the time, arsenic was also translated with the 金-radical character 鉮
石-radical characters (borrowed rare characters or newly coined phono-semantic characters)	Added the 石 radical	Newly coined characters mostly used a phonetic component approximating the Mandarin pronunciation of the first syllable of the Western name (or the second syllable when inconvenient)	矽 ('silicon'), 硒 ('selenium'), 碲 ('tellurium'), 碘 ('iodine')
Liquid element example	Added the 水 (氵) radical	臭 ('pungent/foul-smelling') with the 水 radical, not based on Western pronunciation	溴 ('bromine')
Inorganic compounds	Strung element names together, using shortened forms without 氣 for some gases and appending numerals as needed	Combined element names in sequence, appending numerals when proportions needed to be specified, forming a formula-like compositional notation	Without numerals: 鈉綠 (sodium chloride, modern 氯化鈉), 鈣弗 (calcium fluoride, modern 氟化鈣), 鎘養 (cadmium oxide, modern 氧化鎘); with numerals indicating proportion: 綠養三 (chlorous acid, modern 亞氯酸)

== Stabilization of translated terms ==
In the 19th century, Chinese translations of Western learning were carried out independently by missionaries, foreign translators, and Chinese collaborators working in different regions. Because translators understood the correspondence between Chinese and Western concepts in different ways, a single Western concept often appeared in Chinese texts under multiple parallel or competing translations.

Whether a new term survived was beyond the control of any individual translator, and the paths by which terms stabilized varied across disciplines and even within the same field. Some political terms underwent a long process of adjustment between traditional classical Chinese meanings and Western political concepts. Specialized terminology in fields such as chemistry and international law involved competition between rival naming systems or schools of translation, followed by the introduction of Japanese-coined vocabulary in the early 20th century. Missionaries and translation bureaus separately attempted to collect translated terms across regions or to compile specialized glossaries. At the same time, the names of academic disciplines such as geometry (幾何學, jǐhéxué) and physics (物理學, wùlǐxué) also evolved and stabilized, gradually appearing in textbooks, official school regulations, and terminology lists compiled by standardization bodies.

=== Semantic evolution of political vocabulary ===
Among late Qing political terms, the Chinese equivalents for liberty (自由, zìyóu), democracy (民主, mínzhǔ), and president (總統, zǒngtǒng) each developed under the constraints of classical Chinese usage, differences between Chinese and Western political concepts, and readers' familiarity with foreign institutions, passing through multiple competing translations and gradual semantic adjustment.

When translating the Western concept of liberty, 19th-century writers encountered an existing classical word, 自由 (zìyóu). It appeared early in classical Chinese texts, including Zheng Xuan's commentary on the Book of Rites, the Records of the Three Kingdoms, and the ancient narrative poem "Kongque dongnan fei" (孔雀東南飛, 'Peacocks Fly Southeast'), where it originally meant acting as one pleased without restraint. In the late Qing context, the word could still be understood positively as being free and unencumbered (自由自在), but it could also carry negative connotations of lawlessness and unbridled license.

Nineteenth-century English–Chinese dictionaries and political writings did not settle on a single rendering for liberty. Robert Morrison's dictionary listed 自主之理 (zìzhǔ zhī lǐ, 'principle of self-governance'), while Zuozhi chuyan (佐治芻言) and Xinzheng zhenquan (新政真詮) used 自主之權 (zìzhǔ zhī quán, 'right of self-governance'). At the same time, newspapers and essays began to expound 自由 positively within the framework of Western political philosophy, including the Shanghai newspaper Shen Bao in 1887 and Yan Fu's 1895 essay "Lun shibian zhi ji" (論世變之亟, 'On the Urgency of World Change'). Between May 1900 and January 1902, the missionary periodical Wanguo Gongbao also serialized William Edward Macklin's translation of Herbert Spencer's work on liberty under the title "Ziyou pian" (自由篇).

Misgivings about 自由 did not disappear immediately. In 1892, Chen Chi worried that advocating 自由 might encourage abuses. When the Commercial Press published Huaying yinyun zidian jicheng (華英音韻字典集成) in 1902, it still listed 自主 ('self-governance') alongside 自由. In 1903, Yan Fu's Qunji quanjie lun (群己權界論) and Ma Junwu's Ziyou yuanli (自由原理), both translations of John Stuart Mill's On Liberty, were published in the same year. Ultimately, 自由 became the standard Chinese translation for liberty.

The translation of democracy faced a different historical obstacle. In pre-Qin classical texts, 民主 (mínzhǔ) originally meant 'lord of the people' (民之主), referring to a monarch or ruler. Some 19th-century English–Chinese dictionaries rendered democracy with pejorative glosses such as 多人亂管 ('disorderly rule by many') and 小民弄權 ('petty people manipulating power'). In 1864, W. A. P. Martin used 民主 in Wanguo gongfa (萬國公法, his translation of Henry Wheaton's Elements of International Law) to refer to a republican form of government: expressions such as 民主之國 ('state of mínzhǔ') translated republic rather than the modern sense of democracy. This use of 民主 for a political system also appeared later in Guo Songtao's diary and in Huang Zunxian's Riben guozhi (日本國志, 'Treatises on Japan'). Because the older meaning 'lord of the people' persisted, however, 民主 carried two senses in late Qing writings for a considerable period: it could denote a democratic or republican polity, and it could also serve as a title for the head of state of a republic (that is, a president), as in an 1874 Wanguo Gongbao article titled "Xuanju minzhu" (選舉民主, 'Electing the President') and an 1890 caption for a portrait of George Washington. By 1902, Huaying yinyun zidian jicheng had dropped pejorative glosses such as 亂管 ('disorderly rule') and 弄權 ('manipulating power') for democracy, listing instead the neutral expressions 民政 ('popular government'), 百姓操權 ('the people holding power'), and 民主之國政 ('state governance of mínzhǔ').

Because 19th-century Chinese readers were unfamiliar with the Western institution of an elected president, more than a dozen different Chinese translations appeared for president. Early texts either drew on titles for tribal or group leaders, such as 頭人 ('headman') and 大酋 ('great chieftain'), borrowed existing Chinese official or military titles such as 總理 ('general manager'), 統領 ('commander'), and 總統領 ('commander-in-chief'), or used phonetic transliterations such as 伯理璽天德 (Bólǐxǐtiāndé). At the same time, many newspapers and translated works on history and geography continued to apply traditional monarchical titles such as 國君 ('monarch'), 皇帝 ('emperor'), and 美皇 ('American emperor'). Historian Xiong Yuezhi notes that some Chinese editors at Wanguo Gongbao used the character 皇 ('emperor') out of respect.

In 1874, Young John Allen published an explanation in Wanguo Gongbao distinguishing 皇 ('emperor'), 王 ('king'), and 伯理璽天德 ('president'), pointing out that the last was not hereditary. When former U.S. president Ulysses S. Grant visited Shanghai in 1879, Shen Bao referred to him as 前總統 ('former zǒngtǒng') or 前伯理璽天德 ('former Bólǐxǐtiāndé'), whereas Wanguo Gongbao still used 美皇 ('American emperor') in its headline. In an editorial note, Allen pointed out that although calling him 'emperor' was intended as a mark of respect, it might still offend him, and urged readers to stop using the title for an elected head of state.

The disyllabic term 總統 (zǒngtǒng) appeared repeatedly in Shen Bao editorials in 1878. Late Qing diplomatic writings often used 伯理璽天德 on formal occasions and 總統領 in general narrative. When Li Shuchang served on a diplomatic mission to France in 1879, he used 伯理璽天德 and 總統 interchangeably; when Xue Fucheng presented his credentials in 1890, he used the formal title 大伯理璽天德 ('Great President') while noting separately that 總統 was the common term. By 1902, Huaying yinyun zidian jicheng directly translated the subentry "the President of the United States" under president as 美國總統.

Stabilization of the late Qing political terms 自由 ('liberty'), 民主 ('democracy'), and 總統 ('president')
Chinese term	Related translations and early attestations	Milestones in stabilization
自由 (zìyóu)	Robert Morrison glossed liberty as 自主之理. Walter Henry Medhurst (1847) listed 自主之理, 自主之權, 任意擅專 ('acting arbitrarily'), and 自由得意 ('free and at ease'); Wilhelm Lobscheid (1866–1869) listed 自主, 自由, and 自主之理 side by side.; Zuozhi chuyan (1885) and Xinzheng zhenquan (1890s) both used 自主之權.	Shen Bao (1887), Yan Fu's "Lun shibian zhi ji" (1895), and William Edward Macklin's serialized translation "Ziyou pian" in Wanguo Gongbao (1900–1902) presented 自由 positively.; Huaying yinyun zidian jicheng (1902) still listed 自主 alongside 自由.; Yan Fu's Qunji quanjie lun and Ma Junwu's Ziyou yuanli were published in 1903. 自由 later became the standard translation for liberty.
民主 (mínzhǔ, political-system sense)	Early glosses for democracy: Medhurst (1847) used 多人亂管 and 小民弄權; Lobscheid (1866–1869) used 民政, 眾人管轄 ('governance by the multitude'), and 百姓弄權 ('the common people manipulating power').; 民主 was also used to denote a political system. W. A. P. Martin's Wanguo gongfa (1864) used expressions such as 民主之國 for a republican polity (translating republic); the political-system sense also appeared in Guo Songtao's diary and Huang Zunxian's Riben guozhi (in the triad 君主、民主、君民共主, 'monarchy, republic/democracy, and constitutional monarchy').	Huaying yinyun zidian jicheng (1902) glossed democracy with the more neutral terms 民政, 百姓操權, and 民主之國政.
總統 (zǒngtǒng)	Group-leader titles: 頭人 (a 1817 memorial by the Viceroy of Liangguang), 大酋 (Wei Yuan's Haiguo tuzhi).; Official and command titles: 總理 (Medhurst), 國主 ('lord of the state', Karl Gützlaff), 統領 (Elijah Coleman Bridgman's 1838 Meilige heshengguo zhilüe), 總統領 (Xu Jiyu's Yinghuan Zhilüe), 邦長 ('head of state', Hong Rengan).; Transliterations: 伯理璽天德 (1844 Treaty of Wanghia, 1864 Wanguo gongfa), 伯勒格斯, 伯理喜頓.; Monarchical titles: 國君 (Damei lianbang zhilüe), 皇帝, 國皇, 美皇 (1860s–1870s Jiaohui xinbao and Wanguo Gongbao).; 民主 was also used as a title for an elected head of state, as in Wanguo Gongbao's 1874 "Xuanju minzhu" and an 1890 portrait caption for Washington.	In Wanguo Gongbao, Young John Allen distinguished hereditary monarchs from elected heads of state in 1874 and urged readers in 1879 to stop calling an elected head of state 皇 ('emperor').; Shen Bao editorials used 總統 repeatedly in 1878. Li Shuchang used 伯理璽天德 and 總統 interchangeably in 1879; in 1890, Xue Fucheng noted that 總統 was the common term alongside the formal title.; Huaying yinyun zidian jicheng (1902) translated "the President of the United States" as 美國總統.

=== Competition among specialized terminologies ===
In specialized textbooks and translations of international law, competition did not merely concern individual words; it involved rivalries between entire naming systems developed by different translators or institutions.

In chemistry, several competing Chinese naming systems for chemical elements emerged in the late 1860s and early 1870s. In Gewu rumen (格物入門, 'Introduction to the Natural Sciences', 1868), W. A. P. Martin used terms such as 養氣 ('nourishing gas') for oxygen and 淡氣 (dànqì, which in his book referred to hydrogen). For newly translated elements, he either coined disyllabic semantic translations, such as 灰精 ('ash essence') for potassium and 玻精 ('glass essence') for silicon, or transliterated Western chemical symbols into two characters, such as 避愛 (bì'ài) for bismuth (Bi) and 米治 (mǐzhì) for magnesium (Mg). Scholar Shen Guowei notes that when multiple elements combined into a compound, stringing disyllabic element names together became overly cumbersome. In his English and Chinese Dictionary (英華字典, 1866–1869), Wilhelm Lobscheid glossed element as 行 (xíng, the traditional term for the five phases) and split the character 行 into an outer frame enclosing a semantic component, creating 22 new characters among the 50 elements listed in the dictionary. Shen Guowei observes that this system completely ignored the phonetic function of Chinese characters, and that the outer frame 行 failed to distinguish subcategories in the way radicals such as 金 ('metal'), 石 ('stone'), and 气 ('gas') did. Lobscheid's coinage method never became widely known; Shen attributes the dictionary's limited circulation in China to its high price and Lobscheid's strained relations with other missionaries.

By contrast, the single-character phono-semantic system established by Xu Shou and John Fryer in Huaxue jianyuan (化學鑑原, 'Mirror of the Origins of Chemistry', 1871), which combined a classifying radical with a Mandarin phonetic component, offered both semantic and phonetic advantages. According to historian of science Wang Yangzong, Huaxue chujie (化學初階, 'First Steps in Chemistry'), co-translated by John Glasgow Kerr and He Liaoran at the Canton Hospital, was printed slightly earlier than Huaxue jianyuan, although the latter was begun and completed first. Wang found that 22 newly coined element names in Huaxue chujie closely resembled those in Huaxue jianyuan and concluded that Kerr and He borrowed them from Xu and Fryer. In translating elements, Kerr and He alternated between semantic translation and transliteration, and some of their newly coined characters had a large number of strokes.

The success of Huaxue jianyuan in naming chemical elements did not, however, carry over generally to its terminology for chemical compounds and basic theoretical concepts. When naming inorganic compounds, Xu Shou and John Fryer simply concatenated the names of the constituent elements (for example, rendering sodium chloride as 鈉綠, literally 'sodium-chlorine') and added numerals where necessary. Wang Yangzong argues that this amounted to little more than rewriting chemical formulas and failed to reflect the specific chemical properties conveyed by the English names. For the organic compounds covered in Huaxue jianyuan xubian (化學鑑原續編, 1875) and Huaxue jianyuan bubian (化學鑑原補編, 1882), the existence of isomerism and the fact that the English source text for Xubian had not yet adopted standardized organic nomenclature led the two translators to rely largely on full phonetic transliterations of Western names, apart from a few substances for which they used semantic translations alone or alongside transliterations, such as 檸檬酸 ('citric acid'), 草酸 ('oxalic acid'), 蘋果酸 ('malic acid'), and 葉綠 ('chlorophyll'). Thus acetone, benzoic acid, and ether were transliterated as 阿西多尼 (modern 丙酮, acetone), 偏蘇以克 (modern 苯甲酸, benzoic acid), and 以脫 (modern 乙醚, diethyl ether).

Xu Shou and Fryer also coined Chinese terms for basic theoretical concepts in chemistry. For the composition of matter, they called an element 原質 ('original substance'), a compound 雜質 ('mixed substance'), and an alloy 雜金 ('mixed metal'). For microscopic particles, they translated atom as 質點 ('substance point', or 雜點 in the Huaxue cailiao Zhongxi mingmubiao glossary) and also rendered molecule as 雜點. For quantitative and property concepts, they used 分劑 for 'equivalent' and 性情 for 'chemical properties'.

Wang Yangzong notes that this conceptual terminology fell short in precision. Translating compound as 雜質 and alloy as 雜金, for example, could easily mislead readers into thinking that alloys were compounds. He attributes this partly to the English source texts: David Ames Wells's textbook (1858) and Charles Loudon Bloxam's textbook (1867) treated basic theory briefly and lacked a dedicated exposition of molecular theory. He also suggests that misunderstandings may have arisen during the collaborative process of oral interpretation and written transcription.

Because no new translated chemistry textbooks replaced them for nearly thirty years, these chemical terms remained in use in China for a time. After 1900, as Japanese chemistry books introducing the periodic table and molecular theory were translated into Chinese, Chinese scholars adopted Japanese chemical terminology on a large scale. Most of the compound and theoretical terms coined by Xu Shou and Fryer fell out of use, although many of their element names and a few terms such as citric acid (檸檬酸) and oxalic acid (草酸) survived in modern Chinese terminology. A systematic Chinese nomenclature for organic chemistry was first attempted only in 1908, in Yu Heqin's Youji huaxue mingming cao (有機化學命名草). In addition, Shen Guowei points out that the success of coining new characters for chemical elements encouraged some missionaries overseeing medical terminology (such as the 1889 and 1890 glossaries of the China Medical Missionary Association) to coin new anatomical characters using the radicals 骨 ('bone'), 血 ('blood'), and 肉 ('flesh'). These medical coinages were later gradually replaced by Japanese-derived terms, although Calvin Wilson Mateer's Technical Terms (1904) and Karl Hemeling's Mandarin dictionary (1916) still did not consistently abandon the preference for coining new characters.

Late Qing chemical naming systems compared with modern standard terms
Term category	Western concept	W. A. P. Martin's Gewu rumen (1868) or Wilhelm Lobscheid's English and Chinese Dictionary (1866–1869)	Xu Shou and John Fryer's Huaxue jianyuan (1871) and later glossaries	Modern Chinese term
Solid elements	Potassium / Silicon	灰精 / 玻精 (Martin)	鉀 / 矽	鉀 / 硅
Gaseous elements	Hydrogen / Chlorine	水 enclosed in 行 / 綠 enclosed in 行 (Lobscheid)	輕氣 / 綠氣	氫 / 氯
Inorganic compounds	Sodium chloride / Calcium fluoride	(not listed)	鈉綠 / 鈣弗	氯化鈉 / 氟化鈣
Basic concepts	Organic / Inorganic compounds	(not listed)	生物質 / 死物質 (earlier 生雜質 / 死雜質)	有機化合物 / 無機化合物
Basic concepts	Element / Compound / Atom / Molecule	行 for element (Lobscheid)	原質 / 雜質 / 質點 (雜點 in glossary) / 雜點	元素 / 化合物 / 原子 / 分子

Between 1864 and 1903, two distinct translation traditions developed in international law, one centered in Beijing and the other in Shanghai, each evolving its own terminology. The Beijing tradition began with W. A. P. Martin's Wanguo gongfa (1864); the Tongwen Guan (the Qing government's Beijing interpreters' college) subsequently published Xingyao zhizhang (星軺指掌, 1876), Gongfa bianlan (公法便覽, 1877), and Gongfa huitong (公法會通, 1880), gradually forming a vocabulary system represented by 萬國公法 ('international law'), 性法 ('natural law'), 主權 ('sovereignty'), and 權利 ('rights').

Translation activity in Shanghai centered on the Jiangnan Arsenal, where John Fryer collaborated with Wang Zhensheng, Yu Shijue, Qian Guoxiang, and others to translate and publish Gongfa zonglun (公法總論), Geguo jiaoshe gongfalun (各國交涉公法論, published 1894), and Geguo jiaoshe bianfalun (各國交涉便法論). In addition, Bangjiao gongfa xinlun (邦交公法新論), co-translated by Fryer and Cheng Zhanluo and completed with the assistance of Le Zhirang, was published in 1901 by the Gezhi Shushi (Chinese Scientific Book Depot). In its choice of terminology, the Jiangnan Arsenal tradition retained a few of Martin's terms, such as 主權 ('sovereignty') and 自主之國 ('independent state'), but adopted different renderings for most specialized concepts, translating public international law as 交涉公法, private international law as 交涉便法, and rights as 分所當得 ('what is rightfully due').

Scholar Rune Svarverud notes that because in-depth domestic discussion of international law theory had not yet developed in China before the First Sino-Japanese War (1894–1895), neither the Beijing nor the Shanghai vocabulary system took root in standard late Qing written Chinese. In his view, when Chinese students studying in Japan, such as Cai E and Yang Tingdong, wrote works on international law in 1902–1903 and introduced Japanese-coined Chinese-character terms in bulk, both earlier terminological systems were replaced within months by Japanese-derived terms such as 國際法 ('international law'), 國際私法 ('private international law'), 自然法 ('natural law'), and 治外法權 ('exterritorial rights'). Among the early international law terms he compares, 權利 ('rights') and 主權 ('sovereignty') had already been transmitted to Japan through Martin's translations and remained in modern Chinese international law vocabulary.

Comparison of the two late Qing international law terminology systems with later Japanese-influenced terms
Western concept	Beijing Tongwen Guan tradition (1864–1903)	Shanghai Jiangnan Arsenal tradition (1886–1901)	Japanese-influenced terms (from 1902)
(Public) international law	萬國公法	交涉公法	國際法 (also 國際公法 in book titles)
Private international law	公法之私條	交涉便法	國際私法
Natural law / Positive law	性法 / (not listed)	天然之法 / 實在律法, 特設之律	自然法 / 制定法, 實定法, 實體法
Exterritorial rights	不歸地方管轄	(not listed)	治外法權
Sovereignty / Rights	主權 / 權利	主權 / 分所當得	主權 / 權利

=== Organizing translated terms through dictionaries and glossaries ===
Faced with regional divergences in translated terminology, missionaries compiled comprehensive dictionaries that gathered terms across different parts of China. At the same time, translation bureaus such as the Jiangnan Arsenal and missionary organizations produced specialized glossaries aimed at standardizing usage.

A Vocabulary and Hand-book of the Chinese Language (英華萃林韻府, Yīnghuá cuìlín yùnfǔ), edited by Justus Doolittle and published in Fuzhou and Shanghai in 1872–1873, included 85 specialized wordlists in its third part. Twenty-one of these lists concerned Western learning and were contributed by missionaries and other figures based in Beijing, Shanghai, Guangzhou, and Fujian. The lists covered terminology across multiple fields: Prosper Giquel of the Foochow Arsenal supplied mechanical and nautical terms, Alexander Wylie of the Jiangnan Arsenal in Shanghai contributed terms for steam engines, mathematics, and astronomy, W. A. P. Martin in Beijing provided diplomatic terms, and John Glasgow Kerr in Guangzhou contributed chemical and medical terms. The book also incorporated anatomical and physiological phrases selected from Benjamin Hobson's A Medical Vocabulary in English and Chinese (醫學英華字釋, 1858).

Analyzing the wordlists in Doolittle's compilation, the linguist Shen Guowei notes two patterns. First, by the early 1870s, apart from medical terminology, which still retained many explanatory phrases, most fields of Western learning relied mainly on polysyllabic compounds. Second, the dictionary's record did not capture every regional system in use: although Doolittle completed the compilation in Shanghai, its chemistry wordlist reproduced 616 terms supplied by Kerr in Guangzhou and did not yet reflect the chemical nomenclature developed by John Fryer and his colleagues at the Jiangnan Arsenal in Shanghai.

The Jiangnan Arsenal began working to standardize translated terms as soon as its translation department opened in 1867. In an 1880 English report on the arsenal's translation work, Fryer summarized three terminological principles agreed upon by the bureau. First, before coining a term, translators had to search widely across existing Chinese works on crafts and science, late Ming Jesuit translations, and recent Protestant missionary translations, while also consulting Chinese merchants and artisans for terms already in customary use.

Second, if neither existing texts nor vernacular usage offered a suitable term, translators were to create a new one using one of three methods: coining a new character with a phonetic component or assigning a new meaning to a rare character; forming a descriptive term with as few characters as possible; or transliterating the foreign word according to Mandarin pronunciation, using the same Chinese character consistently for the same sound and giving preference to characters already established in earlier translations or dictionaries. All newly coined terms were treated as provisional and could be replaced before printing if an older existing name or a better translation was found. Third, under these rules, translators were required to record uncommon technical terms and proper names as they translated each book, gradually assembling them into general glossaries for future publication.

Under Fryer's direction, the Jiangnan Arsenal published a series of specialized glossaries during the 1880s. These included a mineralogy glossary in 1883, Jinshi Zhong-Xi mingmubiao (金石中西名目表), which listed about 1,600 terms alongside both earlier translations and Fryer's new renderings; a glossary of chemical substances, Huaxue cailiao Zhong-Xi mingmubiao (化學材料中西名目表); and a pharmaceutical glossary in 1887, Xiyao dacheng yaopin Zhong-Xi mingmubiao (西藥大成藥品中西名目表), containing roughly 6,000 Latin and English drug names with Chinese translations. These lists were brought together in Fryer's 1888 compilation The Translator's Vade-Mecum. At the 1890 Protestant missionary conference in Shanghai, Fryer went further, proposing seven principles for coining terminology and calling for the standardization of scientific and technical terms through specialized glossaries.

=== How disciplinary names took shape ===
As names for foundational academic disciplines evolved, translators competed over where disciplinary boundaries should be drawn. Notable cases included the rivalry between 幾何 (jǐhé) and 形學 (xíngxué) for geometry, between 格致 (gézhì) and 物理學 (wùlǐxué) for physics, and between 重學 (zhòngxué) and 力學 (lìxué) for mechanics.

When Matteo Ricci and Xu Guangqi translated Euclid's Elements as Jihe yuanben (幾何原本) in 1607, 幾何 (jǐhé) was already a common expression in traditional Chinese arithmetic for asking "how much" or "how large," and the two translators left no explicit explanation for choosing it. Noting that the opening of Jihe yuanben renders "quantity" among Aristotle's ten categories as 幾何府 (jǐhéfǔ), Song Zhiye and Ji Zhigang suggest that the term was linked to Latin concepts of number, magnitude, and quantity. Federico Masini, by contrast, has argued that 幾何 may have combined an approximation of the sound of geo- with its original Chinese sense of "how much." In the late Ming, when Li Zhizao and Francisco Furtado translated Mingli tan (名理探, a commentary on Aristotelian logic), they rendered "geometry" as 量法 (liàngfǎ, 'methods of measurement'), alongside the phonetic transliteration 日阿默第亞 (Rì'āmòdìyà). In Ming and Qing writings thereafter, 幾何 carried multiple senses, including surveying or measurement, the study of quantity, the subject matter of Euclid's Elements, geometry, and the study of shapes. When Alexander Wylie and Li Shanlan translated the remaining nine books of the Elements in 1857 (published together with the first six as a complete fifteen-book edition in 1865), they retained the established name 幾何.

Calvin Wilson Mateer objected to this usage in the preface to his textbook Xingxue beizhi (形學備旨). He argued that 幾何 was too broad because it encompassed all of mathematics, and that Euclid's Elements was not devoted solely to figures (books 7 through 10, for instance, dealt exclusively with arithmetic rather than form). Accordingly, he named his own textbook on the principles of form 形學 (xíngxué, 'study of shapes'). Wang Zepei endorsed this view in 1895 in his Xingxue yan (形學演). During the late Qing, 幾何 and 形學 coexisted in actual use. In the imperially approved school regulations Zouding xuetang zhangcheng (奏定學堂章程), the regulations for junior normal schools prescribed "algebra and jihe" (代數、幾何) under mathematics, adding the note that "jihe is also called xingxue." Even in 1910, a Chengdu reprint of Mateer's Xingxue beizhi by Xu Shuxun was retitled Xu jihe (續幾何, 'Sequel to Jihe') by the publisher. In 1956, the official terminology standard Shuxue mingci (數學名詞, 'Mathematical Terminology') approved both 幾何 and 幾何學 (jǐhéxué) as the standard Chinese equivalents for English geometry.

The general name for physics also went through a period of competing translations. In the mid-19th century, the Shanghai periodical Shanghae Serial (六合叢談, Liùhé cóngtán), published by the London Missionary Society Press, introduced physical knowledge branch by branch. Translations from the Jiangnan Arsenal likewise used branch names such as 光學 (guāngxué, 'optics'), 聲學 (shēngxué, 'acoustics'), 熱學 (rèxué, 'study of heat'), and 電學 (diànxué, 'electricity'), but no single agreed-upon name existed for the overarching discipline. Early attempts drew on classical and Song–Ming Neo-Confucian vocabulary: W. A. P. Martin's Gewu rumen (格物入門, 1868, which also included chemistry) adopted 格物 (géwù, 'investigating things') from the Great Learning, while Young John Allen's 1880 translation of Balfour Stewart's Physics (excluding chemistry), titled Gezhi qimeng gewuxue (格致啟蒙格物學), used both 格致 (gézhì, 'investigating things to extend knowledge') and 格物 in its title. When Joseph Edkins retranslated Stewart's text in 1886, however, he switched to 質學 (zhìxué, 'study of matter'). In 1898, Alvin Pierson Parker likewise criticized 格物 as too broad a translation for physics in the reading guide to his Gewu zhixue (格物質學).

In practice, these terms overlapped considerably: 格物, 格致, and 格學 (géxué) were used side by side, 質學 occasionally referred to chemistry or to science as a whole, and 體學 (tǐxué, 'study of the body') often meant anatomy, leaving disciplinary boundaries blurred. In 1898, the Catholic-affiliated periodical Gezhi xinbao (格致新報) and Xingxing xueyao (形性學要), co-translated by Li Di and He Shishen (赫師慎), revived the late Ming term 形性學 (xíngxìngxué, 'study of forms and properties') from Mingli tan. Yet as late as 1901, a reader wrote to the periodical Huibao (匯報) asking why, if living organisms also possess "form" and "properties," 形性學 did not include biology.

Meanwhile, the Japanese term 物理學 (Japanese butsurigaku; Chinese wùlǐxué) gradually entered China. Guo Songtao and Huang Zunxian had mentioned the Japanese term in their writings, while works by Wang Tao and Song Yuren, the 1897 regulations of Nanyang Public School (南洋公學章程), and the 1898 Gezhi xinbao used 物理學 or 物理 (wùlǐ) directly to mean physics. In 1900, the Jiangnan Arsenal published a Chinese translation of Iimori Teizō's Physics (物理學), translated from Japanese by Fujita Toyohachi and Wang Jilie. The historian of science Iwo Amelung has suggested that this book was likely the turning point in the spread of 物理學 in China, even though it still retained earlier Chinese-coined technical terms such as 浪 (làng, 'wave') and 折光 (zhéguāng, 'refraction').

Official curricula and state-sponsored glossaries soon prescribed the term as well. In 1902, the imperially prescribed school regulations Qinding xuetang zhangcheng (欽定學堂章程) listed 物理學 alongside 化學 (huàxué, 'chemistry') under the "Gezhi" division (格致科, the natural sciences division) of the Imperial University of Peking. In 1908, the Review Section of the Ministry of Education compiled Wulixue yuhui (物理學語彙, 'Glossary of Physics'), which was published by the Commercial Press.

In mechanics, Joseph Edkins and Li Shanlan's Zhongxue (重學, 1858–1859) retained the term 重學 (zhòngxué, 'study of weights') from the late Ming work Yuanxi qiqi tushuo luzui (遠西奇器圖說錄最, 1627) by Johann Schreck and Wang Zheng. In 1868, Martin introduced a rival term, 力學 (lìxué, 'study of forces'), in the mechanics section ("Lixue rumen", 力學入門) of his Gewu rumen. Many late Qing texts on Western learning treated 重學 and 力學 as separate branches. Even in 1906, when the Bureau of Compilation and Translation of the Ministry of Education published the textbook Lixue kebian (力學課編), translated by Yan Wenbing and Chang Fuyuan, Yan lamented in his preface the continuing confusion surrounding 重學, 力學, and the names of their subfields.

Examples of the evolution of modern disciplinary names
Discipline	Competing translations	Schools, glossaries, and later usage
Geometry (geometry)	量法 (liàngfǎ; transliterated 日阿默第亞): late Ming Mingli tan (名理探); 幾何 (jǐhé): 1607 Jihe yuanben (幾何原本), 1857 continuation of the final nine books, 1865 complete edition; 形學 (xíngxué): Calvin Wilson Mateer's Xingxue beizhi (形學備旨), Wang Zepei's Xingxue yan (形學演)	Zouding xuetang zhangcheng (奏定學堂章程) listed 幾何 with the note "also called 形學"; 1956 Shuxue mingci (數學名詞) approved 幾何 and 幾何學 as the standard terms
Physics (physics)	格物 (géwù), 格致 (gézhì): 1868 Gewu rumen (格物入門), 1880 Gezhi qimeng gewuxue (格致啟蒙格物學); 質學 (zhìxué): 1886 Joseph Edkins's Gezhi zhixue qimeng (格致質學啟蒙), 1898 Gewu zhixue (格物質學); 形性學 (xíngxìngxué): 1898 Gezhi xinbao (格致新報), Xingxing xueyao (形性學要), 1903 Kexue shumu tiyao chubian (科學書目提要初編)	1900 Jiangnan Arsenal publication of Wulixue (物理學), translated from Japanese by Fujita Toyohachi and Wang Jilie; 1902 Qinding xuetang zhangcheng (欽定學堂章程) listed 物理學 under the "Gezhi" division (格致科); 1908 Wulixue yuhui (物理學語彙) compiled by the Review Section of the Ministry of Education
Mechanics (mechanics)	重學 (zhòngxué): 1627 Yuanxi qiqi tushuo luzui (遠西奇器圖說錄最), 1858–1859 Zhongxue (重學); 力學 (lìxué): 1868 Gewu rumen (格物入門), section "Lixue rumen" (力學入門)	In 1906, when the Bureau of Compilation and Translation of the Ministry of Education published Lixue kebian (力學課編), its preface still lamented the confusion between the two terms and their subfields

== Sino-Japanese lexical exchange ==
From the mid-19th century onward, Chinese-language works on Western learning and English–Chinese dictionaries published in China were gradually transmitted to Japan, supplying Japanese with translated terms for Western concepts. After entering Japanese, some of these terms underwent changes in form, meaning, or pronunciation. From the late 19th to the early 20th century, modern Chinese-character terms that had taken shape in Japan during the Meiji period were in turn borrowed back into Chinese in large numbers. This cross-linguistic circulation produced replacements of earlier translations as well as semantic divergence, and the origins and classification of these neologisms have become a major topic of scholarly debate.

=== Transmission of Western-learning publications to Japan ===
After Japan opened its ports in 1854, Chinese and Western merchants shipped books on Western learning published in China to Japanese ports. Japanese travelers who visited China during the late Edo period also purchased new Chinese translations directly; for example, Takasugi Shinsaku visited the missionary William Muirhead several times in Shanghai in 1862 and bought Chinese translations of Western works. Scholars of the late Edo and early Meiji periods used these Chinese texts and dictionaries as a medium for absorbing Western knowledge, making them accessible by reprinting them, adding kunten reading marks (annotations that aid in reading and interpreting Classical Chinese in Japanese), or compiling specialized glossaries and dictionaries.

In history, geography, politics, and law, the 60-volume (juan) edition of Wei Yuan's Haiguo tuzhi (海國圖志, 'Illustrated Treatise on the Maritime Kingdoms', 1847) first arrived in Japan in 1850. Although the first three imported copies were banned by the Tokugawa shogunate, 25 Japanese translations of selected chapters of the work appeared between 1854 and 1869. Karl Gützlaff's Maoyi tongzhi (貿易通志, 'General Account of Trade', 1840), which was included in Haiguo tuzhi, introduced the term 鐵路 (tiělù, 'railway') into Japanese. Other terms attested in Japanese at the time include 新聞紙 (xīnwénzhǐ, 'newspaper') used by Lin Zexu, 公司 (gōngsī, 'company', used in Japanese at the time to refer to Chinese merchant houses), and 國會 (guóhuì, 'parliament'), which appeared in Lin Zexu's Sizhou zhi (四洲志, 'Gazetteer of the Four Continents'). Federico Masini suggests that some of these terms may have entered Japan through Haiguo tuzhi. Subsequently, Xu Jiyu's Yinghuan zhilüe (瀛環志略, 'A Short Account of the Maritime Circuit', 1848–1849) was reprinted in Japan in 1859 and 1861, and Elijah Coleman Bridgman's Lianbang zhilüe (聯邦志略, 'Brief Account of the United States') was published in Japan in 1861. After Wanguo gongfa (萬國公法, a Chinese translation of Henry Wheaton's Elements of International Law led by W. A. P. Martin) was published in Beijing in 1864, it was reprinted in Japan the following year (1865); terms used in the work, such as 權利 (quánlì, 'rights') and 主權 (zhǔquán, 'sovereignty'), entered early Japanese international law vocabulary.

Periodicals and glossaries of Western terminology were also reprinted or compiled in Japan. Liuhe congtan (六合叢談, Shanghae Serial, 1857–1858), edited by Alexander Wylie, contained terms such as 議院 (yìyuàn, 'legislative assembly' or 'parliament') and 文學 (wénxué, 'literature' or 'learning'). In 1858, Japanese authorities reprinted the journal with its religious sections removed and kunten marks added, and a Japanese translation titled Kanpan Rikugō sōdan (官板六合叢談) appeared in 1864.

By 1872, Murata Fumio had compiled Yōgo on'yakusen (洋語音譯筌), a collection drawing on eight pre-Meiji Chinese works on Western learning: Haiguo tuzhi, Yinghuan zhilüe, Lianbang zhilüe, Chen Fengheng's Yingjili lüeji (英吉利略記), William Muirhead's Da Yingguo zhi (大英國志) and Dili quanzhi (地理全志), Richard Quarterman Way's Diqiu shuolüe (地球說略), and W. A. P. Martin's Wanguo gongfa.

Chinese translations in the natural sciences also reached Japan during the late Edo and early Meiji periods. Benjamin Hobson's Quanti xinlun (全體新論, 'New Treatise on the Whole Body', 1851) and Zhiwuxue (植物學, 'Botany', 1858), co-translated by Li Shanlan and Alexander Williamson, were reprinted in Japan in 1857 and 1867, respectively, while Hobson's Bowu xinbian (博物新編, 'Natural Philosophy') circulated widely from around 1860 to 1880. In the field of electricity, Daniel Jerome Macgowan's Bowu tongshu (博物通書, 'Philosophical Almanac', 1851), which circulated in manuscript copies among Japanese scholars of Dutch learning (rangaku), and Hobson's Bowu xinbian both used the term 電氣 (diànqì, 'electricity'). The rangaku scholar Kawamoto Kōmin originally used the phonetic transcription 越歴的爾 (erekiteru) in the first series of his Ensei kiki jutsu (遠西奇器述, 1854). In volume 11 of Kikai kanran kōgi (氣海觀瀾廣義, 1857), he still used 越歴 (ereki), but added a note stating that Chinese writers had recently translated the term as 電氣; by the second series of Ensei kiki jutsu in 1859, he had switched entirely to 電氣.

These Chinese scientific translations intertwined with Japan's own Edo-period rangaku tradition, and not all such terms entered Japanese for the first time through 1850s Chinese translations. For instance, although Zhiwuxue used the terms 植物學 (zhíwùxué, 'botany') and 細胞 (xìbāo, 'cell'), the rangaku scholar Udagawa Yōan had already used 細胞 in his Shokugaku keigen (植學啟原, 'Principles of Botany'), published in 1834. Similarly, while 空氣 (kōngqì, 'air') appeared in Muirhead's Dili quanzhi (1853–1854) and in Liuhe congtan (whereas Hobson's Bowu xinbian used alternative translations such as 地氣 dìqì and 生氣 shēngqì), 空氣 was already attested in Japan in Kanrei higen (管蠡秘言, 1777) and in the Dutch–Japanese dictionary Haruma wage (波留麻和解, 1796). Arakawa Kiyohide suggests that the circulation of Japanese reprints of Dili quanzhi and Liuhe congtan may have helped popularize the term on an existing Japanese foundation.

English–Chinese dictionaries transmitted to Japan also supplied Japanese with translated terms. Samuel Wells Williams's An English and Chinese Vocabulary, in the Court Dialect (英華韻府歷階, 1844) was reprinted in Japan in 1869 under the title Eika jii (英華字彙), with kunten reading marks added by Yanagisawa Nobuhiro (柳澤信大). Wilhelm Lobscheid's English and Chinese Dictionary (英華字典, 1866–1869) also reached Japan; according to Huang Heqing (2024), more than 70 sets are held in over 30 Japanese public libraries. Among the 27 terms from Williams's dictionary transmitted to Japan that Huang Heqing lists, 25 also appear in Lobscheid's dictionary.

Dictionaries compiled in Japan likewise drew directly on or expanded these English–Chinese dictionaries. Eiwa taiyaku shūchin jisho (英和對譯袖珍辭書, 'A Pocket Dictionary of the English and Japanese Language', compiled by Hori Tatsunosuke in 1862 and reissued in 1866) consulted Walter Henry Medhurst's English and Chinese Dictionary (英華字典) for its translations. Between 1883 and 1885, Inoue Tetsujirō compiled and published Teizō Eika jiten (訂增英華字典), an expanded revision of Lobscheid's dictionary. Examining 35 items that Inoue's revision added for English headwords, example sentences, and definitions that had lacked translations in Lobscheid's original, Kin Keiyu found matching translations for 28 of them in earlier dictionaries, including 13 corresponding to Medhurst's dictionary; he also noted that these additions drew primarily on the Zidian jicheng (字典集成) dictionary lineage of Kwong Ki-chiu and on Justus Doolittle's Vocabulary and Hand-book of the Chinese Language (英華萃林韻府).

The table below selects nine examples from the 44 neologisms in Williams's An English and Chinese Vocabulary, in the Court Dialect analyzed by Huang Heqing, illustrating how they were formed and subsequently transmitted:

Selected terms from An English and Chinese Vocabulary, in the Court Dialect
Term	English equivalent	Formation method	Subsequent transmission
會議 (huìyì)	conference	Repurposing an existing word, converting a verb into a noun	Also appears in Wilhelm Lobscheid's English and Chinese Dictionary, and transmitted to Japan
數學 (shùxué)	mathematics	Repurposing an existing word, gradually becoming the name of a modern academic discipline	Also appears in Wilhelm Lobscheid's English and Chinese Dictionary, and transmitted to Japan
首相 (shǒuxiàng)	prime minister	Repurposing an existing word, adapting a traditional Chinese title for the chief chancellor to translate a modern political office	Also appears in Wilhelm Lobscheid's English and Chinese Dictionary, and transmitted to Japan
袋鼠 (dàishǔ)	kangaroo	Modifier–head neologism	After entering Japan, it was used for a time to refer to the kangaroo, before shifting to refer to the opossum
企鵝 (qǐ'é)	penguin	Modifier–head neologism	Entered Japanese dictionaries via English–Chinese dictionaries, but did not gain currency in Japanese
手套 (shǒutào)	glove	Modifier–head neologism	Appeared in later English–Chinese dictionaries, and transmitted to Japan
洗禮 (xǐlǐ)	baptism	Modifier–head neologism, retaining 洗 ('wash') from earlier translations and adding 禮 ('rite') to indicate a ceremony	Also appears in Lobscheid's English and Chinese Dictionary, and transmitted to Japan
外來 (wàilái; originally 外來種)	exotic	Modifier–head construction (adverbial modifier plus head), used as an adjective	Transmitted to Japan; also appears under imported in Lobscheid's English and Chinese Dictionary
十進 (shíjìn; originally 十進之數)	decimal	Subject–predicate construction, expressing carrying one for every ten	Also appears in Lobscheid's English and Chinese Dictionary, and transmitted to Japan

=== Reception and evolution in Japanese ===
==== Changes in word form ====
Matsui Toshihiko classifies the outcomes of how Japanese received Chinese-coined word forms into four types, based on whether the original Chinese form entered Japanese directly and whether it became established and remained in use. Using international-law translations such as 平行 ('parallel', for equality among sovereign states), 動物 ('animal', for movable property), and 植物 ('plant', for immovable property), he illustrates how original forms were adopted or adapted and examines possible links between these Chinese translations and the terms later used in Japanese: 對等 ('equal footing'), 動產 ('movable property'), and 不動產 ('immovable property').

Matsui Toshihiko's analysis of how Chinese translated word forms were received in Japanese
Type of reception	Original Chinese form	Subsequent development in Japanese
Type 1: Entered directly and remained in use	—	The original Chinese form became established and remained in Japanese
Type 2: Entered directly and was established for a time, but did not remain in use	平行 (used in W. A. P. Martin's Wanguo gongfa, 萬國公法, a Chinese translation of Henry Wheaton's Elements of International Law, borrowing a Qing bureaucratic sense of equal standing in official correspondence and ritual to translate the equal status of sovereign states)	Initially adopted by Nishi Amane and Tsuda Mamichi. Matsui Toshihiko suggests that the term may have failed to survive in law and politics because it clashed with the mathematical term 平行 ('parallel'). Japanese may later have coined 對等 by combining the senses of 對峙/對立 ('standing opposite') and 同等/平等 ('equal'), and 對等 subsequently entered Chinese as well.
Type 3: Not adopted directly; inspired a revised coinage that became established and remained in use	動物 and 植物 (used in Wanguo gongfa to translate the legal concepts of movable and immovable property)	Matsui Toshihiko suggests that if 動貨 inspired Mitsukuri Rinshō to coin 動產 ('movable property'), then 不動產 ('immovable property') would have been easy to form by analogy. Both terms later became shared vocabulary in Chinese and Japanese.
Type 4: Influenced a new coinage or borrowed an existing form; used for a time, but did not remain in use	動物 and 植物 (used in Wanguo gongfa to translate the legal concepts of movable and immovable property)	In Taisei kokuhōron (泰西國法論), Tsuda Mamichi retranslated the pair as 動貨 and 植貨, neither of which remained in use.

==== Changes in meaning ====
Other translated terms from English–Chinese dictionaries and books and periodicals on Western learning followed varied paths in Japanese, including replacement, semantic shift, and the broadening or narrowing of meaning.

Examples of replacement and semantic shift include the translations for 'penguin' and 'kangaroo'. For 企鵝 (qǐ'é, 'penguin'), the 1866 second edition of Eiwa taiyaku shūchin jisho (英和對譯袖珍辭書, a pocket English–Japanese dictionary) included the term on the basis of Walter Henry Medhurst's dictionary. However, Arai Ikunosuke's 1872 Eiwa taiyaku jisho (英和對譯辭書) translated penguin as 海鳥 ('seabird', with an additional gloss 鵝ノ類, 'a kind of goose'), and the 1886 Eiwa jii: fuon sōzu (英和字彙：附音插圖) by Koyasu Takashi and others also rendered it as 海鳥. Japanese came to use the phonetic loanword ペンギン (pengin), and the Chinese translation 企鵝 did not gain currency in Japanese. Japanese also has the term 人鳥 (jinchō). As for 袋鼠 (dàishǔ, 'kangaroo'), Arai Ikunosuke's 1872 Eiwa taiyaku jisho still glossed kangaroo as 獸ノ名 ('name of a beast') with 袋鼠 added in parentheses. In Japanese, however, 袋鼠 later shifted to refer to the opossum, an American marsupial; Huang Heqing also cites a 1954 Chinese text that used 袋鼠 to mean 'opossum'.

In terms of semantic broadening and narrowing, the Chinese translation 合眾國 (hézhòngguó) originally referred to the United States, with 合 ('unite') modifying 眾國 ('many states'), but in Japanese during the late Edo period and early Meiji era it was reanalyzed so that 合眾 functioned as a modifier meaning 'united', 'republican', or 'democratic' before nouns such as 王國 or 政府. For example, Matsuyama Tōan's 1870 Chigaku kotohajime shohen (地學事始初編) and Shimada Yutaka's 1887 Fuon sōzu wayaku ei-jii (附音插圖和譯英字彙) translated the United Kingdom as 合眾王國, while Murakami Hidetoshi's 1864 Futsugo meiyō (佛語明要) rendered the French démocratie as 合眾政府. Chiba Kengo suggests that dictionaries from the 1880s already show a growing division of labor among competing translations, as the broader usage of 合眾 gradually declined, though it persisted longer in geographical and historical writings.

==== Changes in pronunciation ====
The term 保險 ('insurance') was initially read in Japanese with a native Japanese reading before its Sino-Japanese reading became standard. Chinese texts began using terms built around 擔保 ('guarantee' or 'underwrite') in the 1830s, and 保險 appeared in books, periodicals, and dictionaries of the 1850s and 1860s. In Japan, dictionaries originally translated 'insurance' with the traditional commercial term 請合ヒ (ukeai, meaning 'underwriting' or 'guarantee'). When Japanese writers adopted the Chinese character form 保險 in the early Meiji years, some texts continued to gloss it with the traditional native reading; similarly, a March 1872 report in Shinbun zasshi (新聞雜誌) glossed the characters 銀行 ('bank') with the native reading かわせさ (kawasesa). Around 1873, 保險社 ('insurance company') can already be seen glossed with the Sino-Japanese reading ほうけんしゃ (hōkensha). Okada Futoshi notes that the Sino-Japanese reading ホケン (hoken) is said to have become widely established in Japanese only from 1887 (Meiji 20):

Development of forms and readings for 保險 ('insurance') in Chinese and Japanese sources
Stage	Representative sources	Forms and readings used
Formation of the Chinese form	1837–1844: Karl Gützlaff's Eastern Western Monthly Magazine (東西洋考每月統記傳, 1837–1838), Haiguo Tuzhi (海國圖志, 1842), Samuel Wells Williams's An English and Chinese Vocabulary, in the Court Dialect (英華韻府歷階, 1844)	Gützlaff's magazine used 擔保, 保, and 保舉會; Haiguo Tuzhi used 擔保會, 船擔保, 命擔保, and 宅擔保; Williams translated Insurance Company as 擔保會
Formation of the Chinese form	1853–1869: Chinese Serial (遐邇貫珍, 1853–1856), Wilhelm Lobscheid's English and Chinese Dictionary (英華字典, 1866–1869)	Chinese Serial used 擔保之人會 and 海上保險; Lobscheid's dictionary listed 保險 under assurance and insurance
Traditional Japanese translation	1796–1867: Haruma wage (波留麻和解, 1796), Eiwa taiyaku shūchin jisho (英和對譯袖珍辭書, 1862), first edition of James Curtis Hepburn's Waei gorin shūsei (和英語林集成, 1867)	Dutch–Japanese and English–Japanese dictionaries translated it as 請合ヒ (ukeai); the first edition of Hepburn's Japanese–English dictionary entered Ukeai
Adoption of the Chinese characters with native Japanese readings	1869–1879: Shinjuku gesshi (新塾月誌, 1869), Shibata Shōkichi and Koyasu Takashi's Fuon sōzu eiwa jii (附音插圖英和字彙, 1873), Ministry of Education's Hyakka zensho (百科全書), section "Jinkō kyūkyū oyobi hoken" (人口救窮及保險, 1877, translated by Nagata Kensuke), Nakamura Keiu's Eika wayaku jiten (英華和譯字典, 1879)	The 1869 Shinjuku gesshi recorded the Chinese translations as 保險 or 擔保; works from 1873 to 1879 adopted the written forms 保險 or 保險命 while still glossing them with the native readings ウケアヒ (ukeai) and イノチウケアヒ (inochi-ukeai, 'life insurance')
Emergence and spread of the Sino-Japanese reading	From around 1873 onward: third edition of Waei gorin shūsei (1886) and other works	Around 1873, 保險社 is attested with the reading ほうけんしゃ (hōkensha); the 1886 edition of Hepburn's dictionary listed both Ukeai and Hoken; the Sino-Japanese reading ホケン (hoken) is said to have gained wide currency only from 1887

Matsui Toshihiko also examines the shift in the Japanese pronunciation of 女性 ('woman' or 'female') through the practice of reading Chinese texts in Japanese (kundoku). The word 女性 had existed in Japanese since the medieval period with the reading ニョショウ (nyoshō), though Matsui notes that reference works such as Nihon Kokugo Daijiten (日本國語大辭典) do not list corresponding examples from Chinese classics or Chinese Buddhist scriptures.

In 1855, Ōtsuki Teijū published Kaikoku zushi Furansu sōki (海國圖志佛蘭西總記), an annotated Japanese-reading edition based on the account of France in volume 27 of Haiguo Tuzhi, which itself quoted Karl Gützlaff's Eastern Western Monthly Magazine. In the phrase 嗣王男形女性 ('the succeeding monarch has a male form and a female nature'), Ōtsuki glossed 女性 with the kan'on (a layer of Sino-Japanese pronunciation) reading ジヨセイ (written ジョセイ in modern kana orthography, josei). Matsui suggests that this practice of assigning kan'on readings to Chinese-character words when construing Classical Chinese texts may have contributed to the formation of the modern Japanese reading 女性 (josei).

=== Return borrowing ===
The 1875 Japanese publication Hakubutsu shinpen engi (博物新編演義), translated by Horino Ryōhei (堀野良平), included an introductory table titled "Shōko idō hyō" (稱呼異同標, 'Table of Differences in Terminology') that compared scientific terms in the original Chinese translation with Japanese equivalents listed in the table. Japanese terms such as 硫酸 (liúsuān, 'sulfuric acid') and 引力 (yǐnlì, 'attraction') were later adopted into Chinese, whereas 地球 (dìqiú, 'Earth'), used in both languages, had already entered Japanese from Chinese:

Scientific terms in the original Chinese translation compared with Japanese equivalents listed in the 1875 Hakubutsu shinpen engi (博物新編演義)
Terms in the original Chinese translation	Japanese equivalents listed in the table
地氣 (dìqì, 'air' or 'atmosphere')	空氣 or 大氣
養氣 (yǎngqì, 'oxygen')	酸素 or 清氣
淡氣 (dànqì, 'nitrogen')	窒素
輕氣 (qīngqì, 'hydrogen')	水素 or 燃氣
風雨鍼 (fēngyǔzhēn, 'barometer')	驗氣管
寒暑鍼 (hánshǔzhēn, 'thermometer')	寒暖計
磺強水 (huángqiángshuǐ, 'sulfuric acid')	綠礬精 or 硫酸
牽合之性 (qiānhé zhī xìng, 'attraction')	引力

After the First Sino-Japanese War ended in 1895, modern Chinese-character vocabulary that had become established during Japan's Meiji era (1868–1912) entered Chinese in large numbers in the early 20th century. During this period, the number of Chinese students in Japan rose sharply, and scholars studying or living in exile in Japan introduced new knowledge through Chinese-language newspapers and periodicals. At the same time, reformers such as Kang Youwei and Liang Qichao promoted the translation of Japanese books; between 1896 and 1911, 958 Japanese titles were translated into Chinese.

When rendering the same Western concept, Chinese and Japanese sometimes adopted different translated terms in Chinese characters; when the two languages later borrowed from each other, these synonymous or near-synonymous terms could undergo semantic differentiation in each language. Chen Liwei notes that pairs such as 審判 (shěnpàn) and 裁判 (cáipàn), now used for judicial concepts such as trials and judgments, and 民主 (mínzhǔ) and 共和 (gònghé), now meaning 'democracy' and 'republic', respectively, developed distinct meanings through this cross-linguistic borrowing. In the case of 民主 and 共和, 19th-century Chinese translations such as W. A. P. Martin's Wanguo gongfa (萬國公法) used 民主 or 民主之國 (mínzhǔ zhī guó) to refer to a republic. In Japan, the 1862 Eiwa taiyaku shūchin jisho (英和對譯袖珍辭書, 'Pocket Dictionary of the English and Japanese Language') rendered both English republic and democracy as 共和政治 (kyōwa seiji). In the early 20th century, Chinese adopted 共和 under Japanese influence. The two terms later diverged in usage, with 共和 corresponding to republic and 民主 to democracy, a concept that Wilhelm Lobscheid's English–Chinese dictionary (英華字典, Yīnghuá zìdiǎn) had earlier rendered with terms such as 民政 (mínzhèng) and 眾人管轄 (zhòngrén guǎnxiá).

=== Etymology ===
==== Classification frameworks ====
In studies of Sino-Japanese lexical exchange, scholars have classified modern neologisms from several perspectives. Hu Xinxiang summarizes Yamada Yoshio's two-way division of the sources of Japanese terms translating Western learning as kasei shinkango (華製新漢語, Chinese-coined neologisms) and wasei shinkango (和製新漢語, Japanese-coined neologisms). Chen Liwei classifies new Sino-Japanese words of the modern period into three categories: words borrowed directly from China, classical Chinese words repurposed to express foreign concepts, and translated terms coined in Chinese characters in Japan. The first category includes terms introduced from Chinese translations of Western books and from English–Chinese dictionaries published in China.

Within Chinese lexicology, specialized dictionaries of modern neologisms began to appear in the early 20th century, such as Xin Erya (新爾雅), compiled and printed in Tokyo in 1903 by Wang Rongbao and Ye Lan. From the first half of the 20th century onward, Chinese linguists have debated two main questions: whether semantic translations of Western concepts should be counted as loanwords (外來詞, wàiláicí), and how to define "return graphic loans" (回歸借詞, huíguī jiècí) that traveled back and forth between China and Japan:

Major scholarly classification frameworks for modern Sino-Japanese neologisms and loanwords
Classification issue	Proponent and work	Categories	Representative examples and notes
Sources of Sino-Japanese terms for Western learning in Japanese	Yamada Yoshio, Kokugo no naka ni okeru kango no kenkyū (國語の中に於ける漢語の研究, 'A Study of Sino-Japanese Words in the National Language', 1940 Hōbunkan edition); summarized by Hu Xinxiang	Two-way division: (1) words adopted directly from Western books compiled in China (termed kasei shinkango, 華製新漢語, by Hu); (2) words selected by Japanese writers themselves (termed wasei shinkango, 和製新漢語, by Hu)	The second category includes both words based on Chinese classical texts and new combinations coined in Japan
Sources of Sino-Japanese terms for Western learning in Japanese	Chen Liwei (2012)	Three-way division: (1) modern Chinese words borrowed directly from Chinese translations of Western books and English–Chinese dictionaries published in China; (2) words from Chinese classical texts given new meanings (which, if viewed from the perspective of the new meanings assigned in Japan, can broadly be considered Japanese-coined); (3) purely Japanese-coined Sino-Japanese words created independently in Japan	Borrowed from Chinese translations and dictionaries: 電氣 (diànqì, 'electricity'), 電報 (diànbào, 'telegraph'), 地球 (dìqiú, 'Earth'), 銀行 (yínháng, 'bank'), 化學 (huàxué, 'chemistry'), 直徑 (zhíjìng, 'diameter'), 風琴 (fēngqín, 'organ'); Classical words given new meanings: 革命 (gémìng, 'revolution'), 文化 (wénhuà, 'culture'), 經濟 (jīngjì, 'economy'), 社會 (shèhuì, 'society'); Purely Japanese-coined Sino-Japanese words: 哲學 (zhéxué, 'philosophy'), 喜劇 (xǐjù, 'comedy'), 郵便 (yóubiàn, 'postal service'), 美學 (měixué, 'aesthetics')
Definition of "loanwords" (外來詞) in Chinese	Hu Xingzhi, Wailaiyu cidian (外來語詞典, 'Dictionary of Loanwords', 1936)	Broad criterion: includes pure semantic translations	Groups purely semantic translations (全譯義, quányìyì) together with phonetic loans (全譯音, quányìyīn), direct graphic imports from Japanese (全輸入, quánshūrù), phonetic-semantic hybrids (半音半義, bànyīn bànyì), and phono-semantic matchings (音義兼顧, yīnyì jiāngù) as loanwords
Definition of "loanwords" (外來詞) in Chinese	Gao Mingkai and Liu Zhengtan, Xiandai Hanyu wailaici yanjiu (現代漢語外來詞研究, 'A Study of Loanwords in Modern Chinese', 1958); Wang Li, Hanyu shigao (漢語史稿, 'Draft History of the Chinese Language', 1958)	Narrow criterion: excludes semantic loans	Gao and Liu restrict "loanwords" to phonetic loans and graphic loans from Japanese, classifying semantic loans formed from existing Chinese morphemes as native Chinese "neologisms" (新詞, xīncí); Wang Li also classifies semantic loans as neologisms, though he still refers to them with terms such as "translated words" (譯詞, yìcí) and "calques" (模借詞, mójiècí)
Definition of "return graphic loans" (回歸借詞) between Chinese and Japanese	Federico Masini (1993)	Strict criterion: both the written form and the modern meaning must already have existed in earlier Chinese	Argues that a linguistic sign consists of both form and meaning; only words that already carried the same modern meaning in earlier Chinese or Chinese translations of Western books, spread to Japan, and then returned to Chinese (such as 大學, dàxué, already used to refer to Western institutions of higher learning in the 1623 Zhifang waiji, 職方外紀) qualify as return loans, whereas classical Chinese forms that first acquired their modern meanings in Japanese are treated as Japanese-origin loanwords
Definition of "return graphic loans" (回歸借詞) between Chinese and Japanese	Wusi yilai Hanyu shumian yuyan de bianqian he fazhan (五四以來漢語書面語言的變遷和發展, 'Changes and Developments in Written Chinese Since the May Fourth Movement', 1959)	Broad criterion: allows the meaning to have changed in Japanese	The 1959 study describes this phenomenon with the metaphor "overseas Chinese words returning home" (詞僑歸國, cíqiáo guīguó), classifying words whose classical Chinese forms were borrowed in Japan, given new modern meanings, and then transmitted back to Chinese as return loans as well

==== Attribution of specific terms ====
Scholars also disagree over the boundary between Chinese-coined and Japanese-coined terms when attributing individual words. For example, 特殊 (tèshū, 'special' or 'particular') appeared infrequently in Chinese classical texts before becoming common in modern Japanese; some researchers view it as the revival of a Classical Chinese word, whereas Hu Xinxiang classifies it as a Japanese-coined neologism on the grounds that Japanese gave an older word a new meaning. Chen Liwei further points out that the line between Chinese-coined neologisms borrowed directly from Chinese translations of Western books and English–Chinese dictionaries and translated terms in which Japanese writers assigned new meanings to classical Chinese forms is not always clear-cut. For example, words such as 文學 (wénxué), 小說 (xiǎoshuō), and 精神 (jīngshén) had already appeared as equivalents for English words in 19th-century English–Chinese dictionaries (for instance, Robert Morrison's dictionary used 精神 to translate spirit, a pairing later adopted by Japanese–English dictionaries). Their modern meanings include 'literature', 'fiction', and 'spirit' or 'mind', respectively. Whether these words already carried modern Western concepts in Chinese at the time, or instead underwent conceptual reshaping and acquired fixed modern meanings only in the context of Meiji-era Japanese, remains to be examined case by case.

In etymological research, Zhuang Qinyong and Zhou Qinghai argue that several mid- to late-20th-century studies, including the 1980 edition of Wang Li's Hanyu shigao and the 1984 Hanyu wailaici cidian (漢語外來詞詞典, 'Dictionary of Loanwords in Chinese') compiled by Gao Mingkai and colleagues, did not systematically examine Chinese writings and translations by Protestant missionaries from the first half of the 19th century, and consequently misattributed some Chinese-coined neologisms with earlier attestations to Japanese coinage or to the late Qing period. Later researchers examining Ming and Qing Chinese texts on Western learning as well as early periodicals and dictionaries have revised the attribution of several terms; conversely, research has also shown that some words recorded in 19th-century English–Chinese dictionaries published in China may have originated in Japan:

Examples of scholarly reattribution of modern lexical origins
Term	Previous attribution	Revised attribution
議會 (yìhuì, 'parliament' or 'assembly')	Classified as a Japanese loanword in Hanyu wailaici cidian (1984)	Zhuang Qinyong and Zhou Qinghai point out that Karl Gützlaff already used the term in his 1838 Gujin wanguo gangjian (古今萬國綱鑑) and other works
商務 (shāngwù, 'commerce' or 'commercial affairs')	Previously identified by Federico Masini as a Japanese loanword	Zhuang Qinyong and Zhou Qinghai point out that the term already appeared in Karl Gützlaff's 1838 Gujin wanguo gangjian
熱帶 (rèdài, 'tropics')	Listed as a Japanese loanword in Hanyu wailaici cidian	Arakawa Kiyohide demonstrates that the term was already used in Matteo Ricci's Qiankun tiyi (乾坤體義, 1605), Giulio Aleni's Zhifang waiji (職方外紀, 1623), and Wilhelm Lobscheid's English–Chinese dictionary (英華字典)
保險 (bǎoxiǎn, 'insurance')	Listed in Hanyu wailaici cidian as a return loanword that acquired its modern meaning in Japan	Okada (岡田太) cites attestations with the modern meaning in Chinese periodicals and English–Chinese dictionaries from the 1850s and 1860s, arguing that the Japanese term 保險 was borrowed from Chinese
半島 (bàndǎo, 'peninsula')	Recorded in Wilhelm Lobscheid's English–Chinese dictionary (英華字典, 1866–1869), published in China	Arakawa Kiyohide notes that Edo-period Japanese Rangaku scholars had already translated the term from Dutch half and eiland, and it was also included in the 1862 Eiwa taiyaku shūchin jisho (英和對譯袖珍辭書, 'A Pocket Dictionary of the English and Japanese Language'). Lobscheid may have obtained that dictionary during a visit to Japan and consulted it while compiling his own work, or he may have coined the term independently from German Halbinsel

== See also ==
- Wasei-kango
- Loanword
- Reborrowing
- Translation studies
