= Wanguo Gongbao =

Chinese monthly publication (1868–1907)

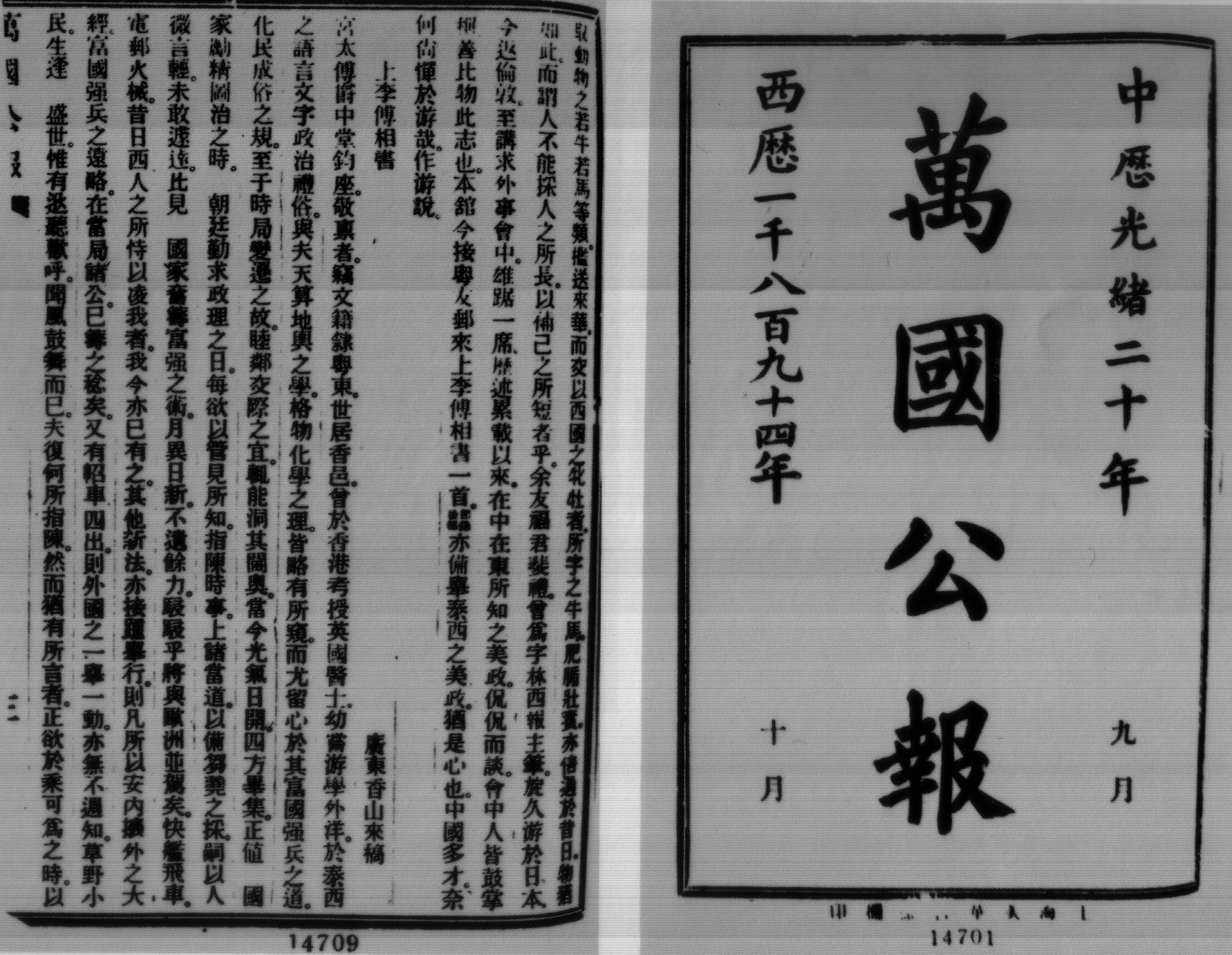
Letter from Sun Yat-sen to Li Hongzhang in 1894, published in the Wanguo Gongbao

A Review of the Times (traditional Chinese: 萬國公報; simplified Chinese: 万国公报; pinyin: Wànguó Gōngbào; Wade–Giles: Wan Kuo Kung Pao; lit. 'The Ten Thousand Nations' Common Newspaper') was a monthly publication in China from 1868 to 1907. It was founded and edited by the American Methodist missionary the Reverend Young John Allen (林樂知) of Georgia. Its subject matter ranged from discussions on the politics of Western nation-states to the virtues and advantages of Christianity.

It attracted a wide and influential Chinese readership throughout its thirty-nine-year run from 1868 to 1907. The Qing reformer Kang Youwei once said of the publication: "I owe my conversion to reform chiefly on the writings of two missionaries, the Rev. Timothy Richard and the Rev. Dr. Young J. Allen."

The other name under which the Rev. Allen published the paper was Jiao Hui Xin Bao ("The News of Churches" or "Church News") from 1868 to 1874.

A Chinese translation of Looking Backward was serialized in this magazine in 1891–1892.

It was initially a weekly publication founded in July 1868 (The 7th year of Tongzhi's reign) in Shanghai. The main publisher was American missionary Young John Allen, with co-publisher British missionaries William Muirhead and Joseph Edkins. It had eight pages per issue and cost one Yuan for a one-year subscription. Its subject matter ranged from the virtues and advantages of Christianity, especially focused on elucidating religious doctrines and telling stories from the Bible, to discussions on politics, history, and science in both China and Western notion-states.

In 1874 (The 13th year of Tongzhi's reign), Jiao Hui Xin Bao changed its name to Wanguo Gongbao. The content became more substantial, but the main publisher remained the same. In 1883(The 9th year of Guangxu's reign), Wanguo Gongbao's publication was suspended due to poor sales. But in 1889 (The 15th year of Guangxu's reign), Wanguo Gongbao had been republished by an organization called the Society for the Diffusion of Christian and General Knowledge Among the Chinese (SDCK). Despite the change to the publication institution, the main publisher was still Young John Allen. The format and content were further improved, and it became a monthly publication. The price for a one-year subscription was one Yuan and twenty-five cents. The main content was still about spreading Christianity; it also took on the responsibility of promoting Western learning (西学), including scientific knowledge, historical events, and the political situation in Western nation-states. Due to that, it raised high attention from government officials in the Qing court.

Even though the main publisher of Wanguo Gongbao was an American missionary, the main audience of the review was the Chinese public, especially the government officials. Shanghai Xin Bao (Shanghai Gazette) in 1870 commented on The News of Churches (original name for Wanguo Gongbao): "It discusses matters both within and beyond the church, and in China and abroad. It is published weekly and costs half a dollar annually. This new newspaper has been widely circulated, and is read not only in the eighteen provinces of China but also in Manchuria and in East Asia." Starting from issue 497, Wanguo Gongbao increased its commentary on current affairs in China. One of the crucial contributors was Hua Zhian, a missionary who paid close attention to China's current affairs. He submitted his famous work "From West to East" to be serialized in the "Wanguo Gongbao since October 1879. Hua Zhian also expected that the meaning of reading newspapers and the targeted audience could also gradually change with the content:

Today, churches in Hong Kong and other provinces have established new newspapers, but they haven't spread far enough to reach the rural areas. If China could truly disseminate new newspapers among the people, rather than just having them read in government offices, the people's sufferings would be communicated to the emperor, and the emperor's grace would be bestowed upon the people, without ever sighing in sorrow. Why would we need to resort to the tactics of Zheng Xia, who sent refugees to seek the wisdom of the emperor and express the people's sufferings?

However, Wanguo Gongbao was still hard to reach the rural areas because most of the villagers did not understand its articles, and the strategy of Wanguo Gongbao was to increase its influence by allowing more elites to read. However, it focused on the ideological dynamic of the Chinese intellectual community during the Reform Movement and further stimulated the reading enthusiasm of intellectuals. During the Reform Movement, Wanguo Gongbao was widely disseminated in China via various channels, like schools and churches. The Sino-Japanese War made more and more people, especially the reformers, realize the value of Wanguo Gongbao. Even in Beijing, where public opinion was strictly controlled, some enlightened gentry began to read The Chinese Repository. Many representative figures of the reform, such as Kang Youwei, Liang Qichao, Tan Sitong, and Tang Caichang, were deeply influenced by Wanguo Gongbao.

The reason why it was popular among the reformers is the opinion on it would not be afraid to use harsh words. Xu Shouchang said that Wanguo Gongbao broke the taboo of speech and could reveal the disaster in China today. Gao Fengqian also commented that: "Wanguo Gongbao's satire on current politics was perhaps even more blatant than that of the Qiang Xue Hui, yet officials dared not interfere because it was run by a Westerner." After the publication of Wanguo Gongbao ceased in July 1907, its subsequent influence was still very great; some readers were still looking forward to reading the magazine.
