= Young John Allen =

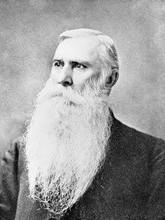
- Born: January 23, 1836; Burke County, Georgia, US
- Died: May 30, 1907 (aged 71); Shanghai, China

Young John Allen (January 3, 1836 – May 30, 1907) or Young J. Allen, was an American Methodist missionary in late Qing dynasty China with the American Southern Methodist Episcopal Mission. He is best known in China by his local name Lin Lezhi (林乐知).

Allen's most influential work was in the field of education, as he worked at a government school before founding the Anglo-Chinese College in Shanghai. He was also a strong force in educating women at a time when that was very radical for Confucian society. His efforts helped to found the McTyeire School for girls. Allen also published several newspapers and magazines as a form of both evangelism and education, which influenced many Chinese reformers of the Self-Strengthening Movement and prompted philosophical discussions comparing Christianity and Confucianism. His publications were popular among many Chinese for their attention to Western concepts of international relations, economics and the natural sciences.

== Early life ==
Allen was born in Burke County, Georgia, USA, the son of Andrew Young John Allen and Jane Wooten Allen. His father died in November before his birth in January and his mother died twelve days after his birth. His father left him a comfortable patrimony which was managed well by William Norsworthy, the guardian chosen by his parents. However, by the dying request of his mother he was given to the care of her sister, Nancy (Mrs. Wiley Hutchins). He was fifteen years old when he learned that his name was not Hutchins but Allen. His foster parents moved with him to Meriwether County, GA., where he attended the brief annual sessions of an old fashioned school from 1842 to 1850.

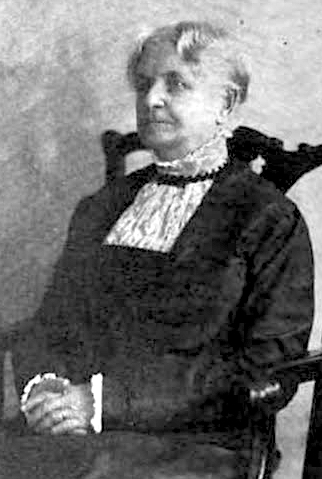
Mary Houston Allen, from a 1912 publication

Although the families, his own and his foster parents, were members of the Primitive Baptist Church, Young Allen came under Methodist influence and in 1853 was converted and at the same time felt himself called to the Christian ministry. Warren Akin Candler (of the Coca-Cola Candlers) described Allen's conversion to Christianity while attending high school at Looney's school in Starrsville, Georgia in September 1853. After one term at Emory and Henry in Virginia, Young Allen entered Emory College in the fall term of 1854 and graduated with honor on July 21, 1858. On July 22, 1858, he married Mary Houston, daughter of Samuel and Sarah Germany Houston who was born February 16, 1839, in Coweta County, Georgia. She graduated on July 14, 1858, from Wesleyan College at Macon.

== Work in China ==
On Dec. 18, 1859 Young and Mary Allen and their infant daughter, Mellie, sailed from New York and on July 13, 1860, reached Shanghai. The trip was funded by Young selling his land and slaves. From 1861 to 1866 while he was cut off from his church at home by the American Civil War, he worked as a coal and rice broker, a cotton buyer, teacher, editor and translator. Because of the poverty in the South he continued these employments and did as much preaching as he could. He also studied the Chinese classics and published a religious weekly, Jiao Hui Xin Bao (Church News), a precursor of the later Wan Guo Gong Bao (Globe Magazine). Lack of funds from the Board of Missions compelled him to support himself and his family. Nevertheless, on May 18, 1881, he announced his withdrawal after "an almost consecutive service of nearly eighteen years, in connection with the Educational, Editorial, and Translation Departments of the Government Institution here Shanghai," in order to devote his full-time to the work of Superintendent to which he succeeded when Rev. J. W. Lambuth returned to the United States because of ill health.

In 1878 Allen returned for the first time to the United States to serve as one of the delegates from the North Georgia Annual Conference to the General Conference held in Atlanta during May, 1878. On May 15 he addressed the General Conference on the "work in China." In June and July he visited old friends and delivered commencement addresses and sermons in many places. On July 17 Emory College conferred upon him the degree of Doctor of Laws. He visited the United States again in 1888, 1893, 1898 and 1906.

In 1883 he purchased land for the site of the Anglo-Chinese College which he served as president from its opening in 1885 until his resignation in 1895 because of impaired health. He was instrumental in founding the McTyeire Home and School, (McTyeire School for Girls, where the Soong sisters attended before they attended Wesleyan College) which opened in 1892 with Miss Laura Haygood, sister of his old friend and Emory classmate, Atticus Haygood, as its head. He also founded the Dongwu University (now Suzhou University) in Suzhou, and later integrated the Anglo-Chinese College into it as a result of Dongwu's lack of teachers and students. The missions of his church to Japan and Korea were influenced by the success of his educational work in Shanghai.

The list of Young's literary productions includes about 250 volumes of original and translated works, published under the auspices of the Methodist Society for the Diffusion of Christian and General Knowledge Among the Chinese (S.D.C.K.) in Shanghai. In Shanghai, Allen edited a Chinese tri-weekly periodical, North China Herald, 1860–1861. He founded and edited the monthly Wan Guo Gong Bao, or Review of the Times from 1868 to 1907, a paper "said...to have done more for reform than any other single agency in China."

The Review attracted a wide and influential Chinese readership throughout its thirty-nine year run. One of the ways in which the Review appealed to a broad, scholarly audience was through its discussion of current events and economics. During the First Sino-Japanese War period of 1894–1895, essay titles included: "International Intercourse, by a descendent of Confucius," "How to Enrich a Nation, by Dr. Joseph Edkins," "The Prime Benefits of Christianity, by the Rev. Timothy Richard," and "On the Suppression of Doubt and the Acceptance of Christ, by Sung Yuh-kwei." The articles attributed practical applications to the Christian faith and portrayed Christianity as a useful concept for the Chinese, one that Allen and his contributors intended to portray on an equal level to concepts such as market economics and international law. The Qing reformer Kang Youwei once said of the publication: "I owe my conversion to reform chiefly on the writings of two missionaries, the Rev. Timothy Richard and the Rev. Dr. Young J. Allen." Rev. Richard was Allen's colleague and a contributor to the Review.

Publication of the Review ceased shortly after Allen's death in Shanghai in 1907.

== Family ==
Young and Mary had nine children.

== Memorials ==
- Allen Memorial United Methodist Church, Emory at Oxford, Oxford, Georgia, USA, is a memorial to Dr. Young J. Allen.
- Allen-Lee Memorial United Methodist Church, Lone Oak, Georgia, USA is also a memorial to Dr. Young J. Allen.

After the Anglo-Chinese College was relocated to Suzhou, the college's remaining site was reorganized as Dongwu University Second High School. The school renamed one of the churches on campus as Y.J. Allen Memorial Church in English while using Jing Lin Tang, 景林堂 (literary translation: Admire Lin Church) as its Chinese name in 1907. In 1923, Y.J Allen Memorial Church was rebuilt across the street from the school location. T. V. Soong was the biggest donor to the project and was actively involved in the designing and constructing process of the project. The Soong family regularly visited the church. During the Cultural Revolution of the 1960s, religious activities were stopped at the church. The church re-initiated its service in the 1980s changing its name to the homonym, Jing Ling Tang, 景灵堂.

== Sources ==
- Encyclopedia of Shanghai, Shanghai Lexicographical Publishing House
- Old Photos of Shanghai, Shanghai People Fine Arts Publishing House
- The Soong Sisters at www.wesleyancollege.edu
- Mirkopoulos, Sofia. "Uncovering Mary Houston: An Investigation Of Her Relationship With Her Husband Young J. Allen And The World Around Her" (PDF). Endeavors in History. Archived from the original (PDF) on 2023-03-12.
- Young John Allen at the Stuart A. Rose Manuscript, Archives, and Rare Book Library
