= Elements of International Law =

1836 book by Henry Wheaton

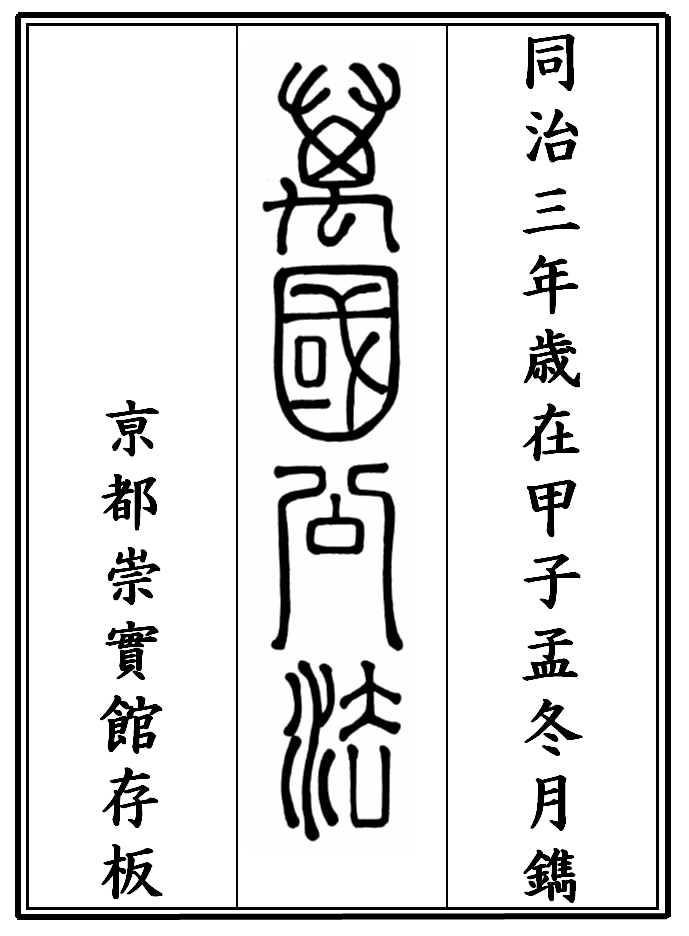
- Japanese edition cover
- Author: Henry Wheaton
- Language: English
- Subject: International Law
- Publisher: Carey, Lea and Blanchard
- Publication date: 1836
- Publication place: United States
- ISBN: 978-0-230-50529-2
- OCLC: 853812

Elements of International Law

Chinese name
- Traditional Chinese: 萬國公法
- Simplified Chinese: 万国公法
Transcriptions
Standard Mandarin
- Hanyu Pinyin: Wànguó Gōngfǎ
Yue: Cantonese
- Jyutping: Maan6 gwok3 Gung1 faat3
Southern Min
- Hokkien POJ: Bān-kok Kong-hoat

Vietnamese name
- Vietnamese: Vạn quốc công pháp
- Chữ Hán: 萬國公法

Korean name
- Hangul: 만국공법
- Hanja: 萬國公法

Japanese name
- Kanji: 万国公法
- Kana: ばんこくこうほう
- Kyūjitai: 萬國公法

Elements of International Law, first published in 1836, is a book on international law by Henry Wheaton which has long been influential.

== Textual history ==
Many translations, editions and reprints of Wheaton's Elements have appeared since its first publication. The third edition was published in Philadelphia in 1845. At the request of Wheaton's family, the sixth edition, with the last corrections of the author and a biographical notice, was published by William Beach Lawrence (Boston, 1855). Lawrence also published the seventh edition (1863). The eighth edition was published, with new notes and a new biography, by Richard Henry Dana Jr. (Boston, 1866). Dana's alleged use of Lawrence's notes from the previous editions resulted in a protracted legal controversy.

A French translation was published in Leipzig and Paris in 1848. At the insistence of Anson Burlingame, U.S. minister to China, Wheaton's book was translated into Chinese and published at the expense of the imperial government (4 vols., Pekin, 1865). The translator was American Protestant missionary William Alexander Parsons Martin who was working in China at that time. The book was also translated into Japanese and the language of each country of Asia.

The original edition bore the title Elements of International Law with a Sketch of the History of the Subject. Some subsequent editions omitted the "Sketch," which in 1845 became (in expanded form) part of Wheaton's History of the Law of Nations in Europe and America.

== Influence ==
The translations had a large influence on the approval of modern international law in Asia. Wheaton's was the first book to introduce international law to East Asia in full scale. In listing Henry Wheaton among "prominent jurists of the nineteenth century," Antony Anghie comments on the "several editions" of Elements of International Law and on the work as "widely respected and used at this time."
