= Society for the Diffusion of Christian and General Knowledge Among the Chinese =

The Society for the Diffusion of Christian and General Knowledge Among the Chinese or SDCK (Chinese: 廣學會; pinyin: Guangxuehui) was an organization established in Shanghai in the late-19th century to communicate Western concepts of Christianity and science among the Chinese.

== History ==
In 1887, the SDCK was founded in Shanghai and led by a group of American and British Methodist missionaries including Young John Allen, William Alexander Parsons Martin, Timothy Richard and Alexander Williamson. Its English name was changed in 1906 to the Christian Literature Society for China, reflecting in part one of its major sources of funds, the Christian Literature Society in Glasgow and in other parts of the world.

The SDCK endeavored to communicate Western concepts of Christianity and science among the Chinese through the translation of materials into the Chinese language. Its members also sought to prompt legal and institutional reform in China.

== See also ==
- Protestant missionary societies in China during the 19th Century
