= Joseph Edkins =

British missionary and linguist (1823–1905)

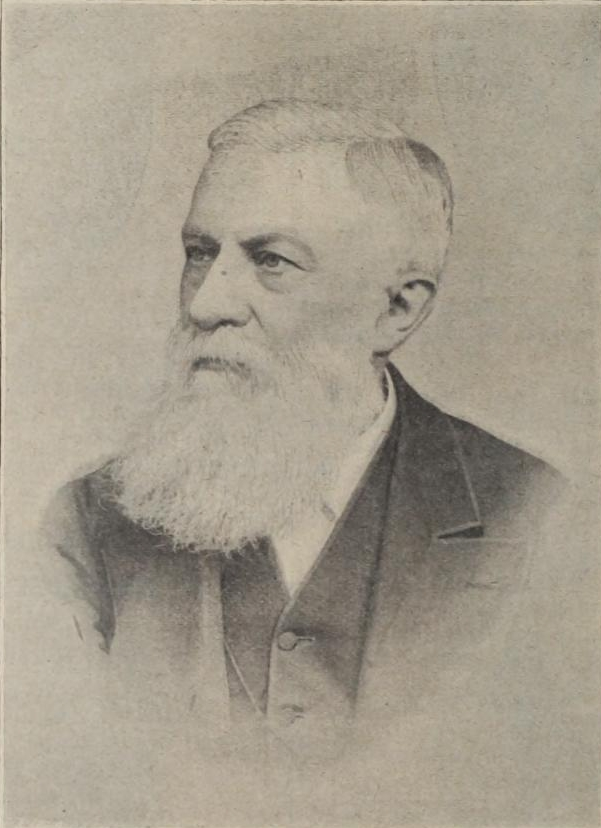
- Missionary to China
- Born: 19 December 1823; Nailsworth, Gloucestershire, England
- Died: 23 April 1905 (aged 81); Shanghai, Qing China
- Education: University of London
- Spouse(s): Jane Rowbotham Edkins (née Stobbs)

Chinese name
- Chinese: 艾約瑟
Transcriptions
Standard Mandarin
- Hanyu Pinyin: Ài Yuēsè

Joseph Edkins (19 December 1823 – 23 April 1905) was a British Protestant missionary who spent 57 years in China, 30 of them in Beijing. As a Sinologue, he specialised in Chinese religions. He was also a linguist, a translator, and a philologist. Writing prolifically, he penned many books about the Chinese language and the Chinese religions especially Buddhism. In his China's Place in Philology (1871), he tries to show that the languages of Europe and Asia have a common origin by comparing the Chinese and Indo-European vocabulary.

== Life ==
Born at Nailsworth, Gloucestershire, he was trained at Coward College, a dissenting academy that trained people for nonconformist ministry and graduated from the University of London in 1843. He was ordained on 8 December 1847. Sent by the London Missionary Society, he arrived in China on 22 July 1848 at Hong Kong, and reached Shanghai on 2 September. First he worked in the London Missionary Society Press in Shanghai under Walter Henry Medhurst. From 1852 to 1858 he edited the Chinese annual Chinese and Foreign Concord Almanach (華洋和合通書), later known as the Chinese and Western Almanac (中西通書). During this period of time, he collaborated with Li Shanlan, Wang Tao and others to translate many Western scientific works into Chinese. Besides this, he was involved in Bible translation and an active member of the North China Branch of the Royal Asiatic Society. In the 1850s he travelled extensively in the Shanghai and Ningbo regions. He also was involved in direct evangelism, and accompanied Hudson Taylor on some of his first canal-boat travels in China, distributing portions of Scripture and Christian tracts.

In March 1858 he left for England. When he returned, he brought his Scottish bride, Jane Rowbotham Stobbs. They were married on 7 February 1859. They settled in Shanghai on 14 September the same year.

During his years in Shanghai, in July 1860 he visited the Taiping Rebellion leaders at Suzhou, Jiangsu. He made several contacts with the leaders of the "Taiping Heavenly Kingdom" in an effort to determine the precise beliefs of this movement. In late March 1861 he spent eleven days in Taiping-held Nanjing.

In 1860 the Edkins family moved to Yantai, Shandong, and in 1861 to Tianjin. His wife died before 1863 at the age of 22. Edkins remarried, to Janet Wood White, that year. In May 1863 he settled in Beijing. In 1872, he collaborated with William A P Martin to publish the Chinese magazine Peking Magazine (中西聞見錄). The magazine ran for 36 issues, terminating in 1875.

In 1873, he travelled alone to England via the United States, and returned to Beijing in 1876. In 1880 he resigned from the London Missionary Society to become a translator for the Chinese Imperial Maritime Customs. He was widowed a second time in 1877 and married Johanna Schmidt in 1881. He was appointed by the Customs head to edit and translate a series of Western scientific works into Chinese, and the fruits were the 16 Primers for Western Knowledge (西學啟蒙十六種) published in 1898, which comprised textbooks about zoology, botany, chemistry, geography, physiology, logic and other subjects. In 1903 he survived typhoid and was still writing at the age of 81. He died in Shanghai on Easter Sunday, 1905.

== Works ==
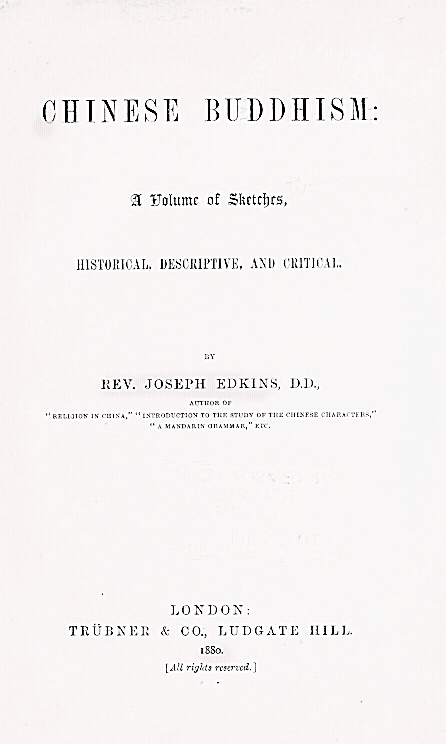
Chinese Buddhism, by Joseph Edkins, 1880

- Joseph Edkins (1853). A Grammar of Colloquial Chinese: as exhibited in the Shanghai dialect. Shanghai: Presbyterian Mission Press.
- Joseph Edkins (1857). A grammar of the Chinese colloquial language commonly called the Mandarin dialect. Shanghai: Presbyterian mission press.; Joseph Edkins (1864). A grammar of the Chinese colloquial language commonly called the Mandarin dialect (2 ed.). Shanghai: Presbyterian mission press.
- Joseph Edkins (1864). Progressive lessons in the Chinese spoken language: with lists of common words and phrases, and an appendix containing the laws of tones in the Peking dialect ... (2 ed.). Shanghai: Presbyterian mission press. p. 103.
- Joseph Edkins (1869). A vocabulary of the Shanghai dialect. Shanghai: Presbyterian Mission Press.
- Joseph Edkins. The Miau-tsi Tribes. Foochow: Rozario, Marcal and Co.
- Joseph Edkins (1871). China's place in philology: an attempt to show that the languages of Europe and Asia have a common origin. Adegi Graphics LLC. p. 435. ISBN 978-1-4021-8104-7.
- Joseph Edkins (1876). Introduction to the study of the Chinese characters. Hertford: Trübner & co. p. 314.
- Joseph Edkins (1876). A catalogue of chinese works in the Bodleian library. Clarendon Press.
- Joseph Edkins (1880). Chinese Buddhism: a Volume of Sketches, Historical, Descriptive, and Critical. London: Trübner & Company.
- Joseph Edkins (1888). The evolution of the Chinese language: as exemplifying the origin and growth of human speech. Trübner and Company. p. 99.
- Joseph Edkins (1898). Opium: Historical Note; or The Poppy in China. Shanghai: American Presbyterian Mission Press. "Joseph Edkins."
- Joseph Edkins (1901). Chinese currency. Shanghai: Presbyterian Mission Press. pp. 151.
- Joseph Edkins (1903). The revenue and taxation of the Chinese empire. Presbyterian Mission Press. pp. 240.
- Joseph Edkins (1905). Banking and prices in China. Shanghai: Presbyterian Mission Press. pp. 286.
