= Hailu (book) =

Hailu (simplified Chinese: 海录; traditional Chinese: 海錄; pinyin: Hǎilù; Wade–Giles: Hai-lu; "Records of the Seas") is a Chinese description of the world published in 1820 during the Qing dynasty. The Chinese travelogue about Asia, Europe, and America was recorded by Yang Bingnan 杨炳南 based on the accounts of Xie Qinggao 谢清高 (1765–1821).

Hailu 海錄 (title page)

== Content ==
The geographical work was orally recounted by Xie Qinggao and written down by Yang Bingnan. The book was carved for printing and published in 1820. The work introduces ninety-five countries around the world and is an important source for the study of the history of contacts between China and the West in the late eighteenth century as well as the history of overseas Chinese communities in Southeast Asia. During his campaign to suppress opium in Guangdong, Lin Zexu 林则徐 read the book and praised it, saying that its accounts of foreign countries were “quite precise and carefully recorded” (“所載外國事頗為精審”)

Both Wei Yuan's 魏源 Haiguo tuzhi 海国图志 (Illustrated Treatise on the Maritime Kingdoms) and Xu Jiyu’s 徐继畬 Yinghuan zhilüe 瀛环志略 (A Brief Account of the Oceans and the World) quote material from this work. The original book was not divided into volumes. Later, the Chinese historian and historical geographer Feng Chengjun 冯承钧 (1887–1946), added annotations and divided it into three volumes.

Li Zhaoluo 李兆洛 (1769–1841), a Chinese geographer and contemporary of Xie Qinggao, recognized the value of the records in 1821. He wrote in his preface to the Haiguo jiwen 海國紀聞 (Accounts Heard of the Maritime Countries):

所言具有條理，於洪濤巨浸，茫忽數萬里中，指數如視堂奧。又於紅毛、荷蘭諸國，吞井濱海小邦，要隘處輛留兵成守，皆一一能詳，尤深得要領者也。

(roughly translated:)

What is recorded is orderly and coherent; amidst the vast, tumultuous waves stretching tens of thousands of miles, the points are indicated as clearly as if viewing the innermost halls. Moreover, regarding the foreign powers such as the ‘Red Hair’ [the English] and the Dutch, the small coastal states along bays and strategic passes, where troops are stationed to defend key positions, he is able to describe each one in detail, grasping especially the essential points.

The work Hailu contains very detailed records of matters related to the Portuguese; in some cases, it explicitly states that the information came from the mouths of the Portuguese themselves. The book describes how the Portuguese, on the island of Java in the mountains of the Kingdom of Bantam, encountered “cannibals”:

西洋番雲︰「其國常有船至此者，船中人上山探望，攀危躡險，遙見山番，穴處而食生魚。覺人窺伺，噪而相逐，羣趨而逃，後者輒爲所殺，爭生食之。比回船，僅存十六人，急掛𢁒而遁，自此無敢復至者。」

(roughly translated:)

The Western foreigners say: "In this country, ships frequently come here. People on board climb the mountains to explore, scaling dangerous and risky terrain. From a distance, they see the mountain natives in their caves eating raw fish. When the natives realize they are being watched, they make a commotion and pursue each other, with many fleeing. Those who are caught are killed and eaten alive. By the time the ship returns, only sixteen people remain. They quickly hoist the sails and escape. Since then, no one has dared to come here again."

The Hanyu da zidian f.e. is using the edition of the Haishan xianguan congshan 海山仙馆丛书, together with the commentary by Feng Chengjun 冯承钧 (Hailu zhu 海录注. Zhonghua shuju 中华书局, 1955).

== See also ==
- Wei Yuan 魏源: Haiguo tuzhi 海國圖志
- Xu Jiyu 徐繼畬: Yinghuan zhilüe 瀛寰志略

== Bibliography ==
- Feng Chengjun 冯承钧: Hailu zhu 海录注. Zhonghua shuju 中华书局, 1955
- Aufzeichnungen über die Meere (Hai-lu 海錄). Niedergeschrieben von Yang Bingnan 楊 炳南 nach dem mündlichen Bericht von Xie Qinggao 謝清高. Deutsch von Rainer Schwarz. Mit Nachwort und Register herausgegeben von H. Walravens. Staatsbibliothek zu Berlin 2011. 97 pp. ISBN 978-3-88053-170-3 (full German translation of the Hailu, first published by Yang Bingnan in 1820). - Also: Gossenberg : OSTASIEN Verlag 2020 (Reihe Phönixfeder ; 36)
