= Yinghuan zhilüe =

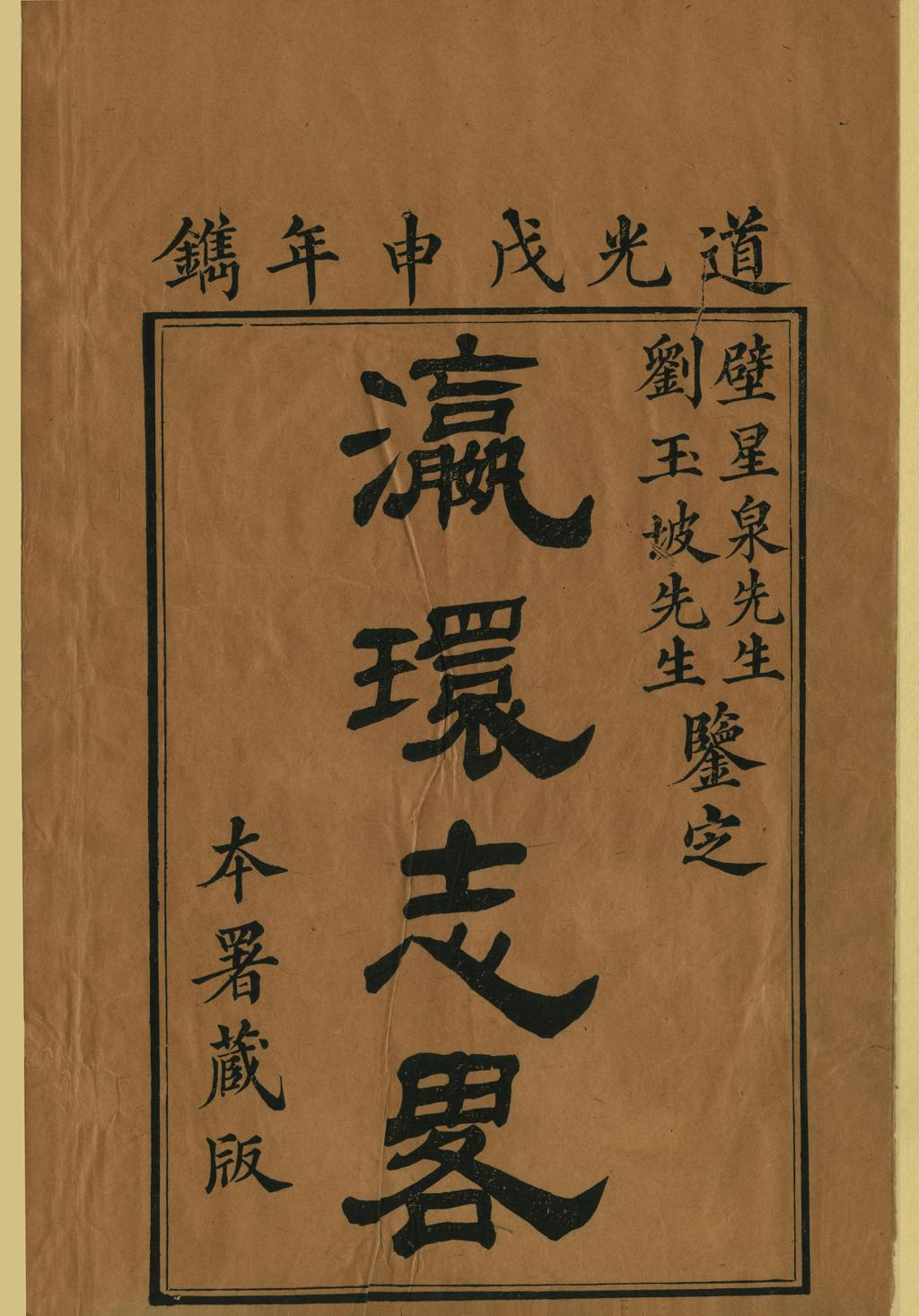
Yinghuan zhilüe 瀛寰志略 (title page)

Yinghuan zhilüe (simplified Chinese: 瀛寰志略; traditional Chinese: 瀛环志略; pinyin: Yínghuán zhìlüè; Wade–Giles: Ying-huan chih-lüeh; variously translated with: "Concise records of the world" or “A Short Account of the Maritime Circuit”, etc.) compiled by Xu Jiyu 徐繼畬 (1795-1873), governor of Fujian, and published in 1848, is regarded as the earliest Chinese descriptive geography of the world. The work, consisting of ten juan, presents continents and major countries with information on climate, topography, history, and customs, and partly draws on knowledge provided by Western missionaries such as David Abeel (1804-1846). It was written in the aftermath of the First Opium War and aimed to give China a better understanding of the world beyond the traditional Chinese sphere.

The world geography did not simply place sources side by side without comment; rather, he synthesized them into a new, comprehensive account. The motivation behind this work was according to the German sinologist Hartmut Walravens less a matter of state policy than Xu’s own geographical interests.

In the preliminary remarks (fanli 凡例) to the work Xu mentions several of the problems he had to contend with, which can be generalized:

泰西人如利瑪竇、艾儒略、南懷仁之屬，皆久居京師，通習漢文，故其所著之書，文理頗為明順，然誇誕詭譎之說，亦已不少。近泰西人無深於漢文者，故其書多俚俗不文，而其敘各國興衰事蹟，則確鑿可據。乃知彼之文轉不如此之樸也。

(roughly translated:)

Westerners (people of Taixi) such as Matteo Ricci, Giulio Aleni, Ferdinand Verbiest, and others of their kind all lived for a long time in the imperial capital and were thoroughly versed in Chinese writing. Therefore, the books they authored are quite clear and fluent in style and reasoning. Yet they also contain not a few exaggerated, fantastical, and deceptive claims. In more recent times, however, there have been no Westerners deeply proficient in Chinese; consequently, their books are often colloquial and lack literary refinement. But when they narrate the rise and decline of the various countries and record their historical events, these accounts are reliable and can be trusted as evidence. From this one realizes that their own writings are in fact not as plain as these.

外國地名最難辨識，十人譯之而十異，一人譯之而前後或異。蓋外國同音者無兩字，而中國則同音者或數十字；外國有兩字合音，三字合音，而中國無此種字。故以漢字書番語，其不能吻合者，本居十之七八，而泰西人學漢文者皆居粵東。粵東土語本非漢文正音，展轉淆訛，遂至不可辨識。

(roughly translated:)

Foreign place names are the most difficult to identify. If ten people translate them, there will be ten different versions; even when a single person translates them, earlier and later renderings may differ. The reason is that in foreign languages there are not two different characters with the same sound, whereas in Chinese there may be dozens of characters sharing the same pronunciation. Moreover, foreign languages have combinations of two or three sounds, while Chinese has no such characters. Therefore, when foreign words are written with Chinese characters, seven or eight cases out of ten will not correspond closely. Furthermore, Westerners who study Chinese generally reside in Guangdong. The local speech of Guangdong is not the correct pronunciation of literary Chinese, and through repeated transmission it becomes confused and corrupted, until it is no longer recognizable.

泰西各國語音本不相同，此書地名有英吉利所譯者，有葡萄牙所譯者。英人所譯，字數簡而語音不全；葡人所譯，語音雖備，而一地名至八九字，詰屈不能合吻。

(roughly translated:)

The pronunciations of the Western countries are fundamentally different. In this book, some place names were translated by the English, and others by the Portuguese. The names translated by the English are short but do not fully capture the pronunciation; the names translated by the Portuguese do represent the pronunciation more completely, but a single place name can extend to eight or nine characters, making it cumbersome and difficult to match accurately.

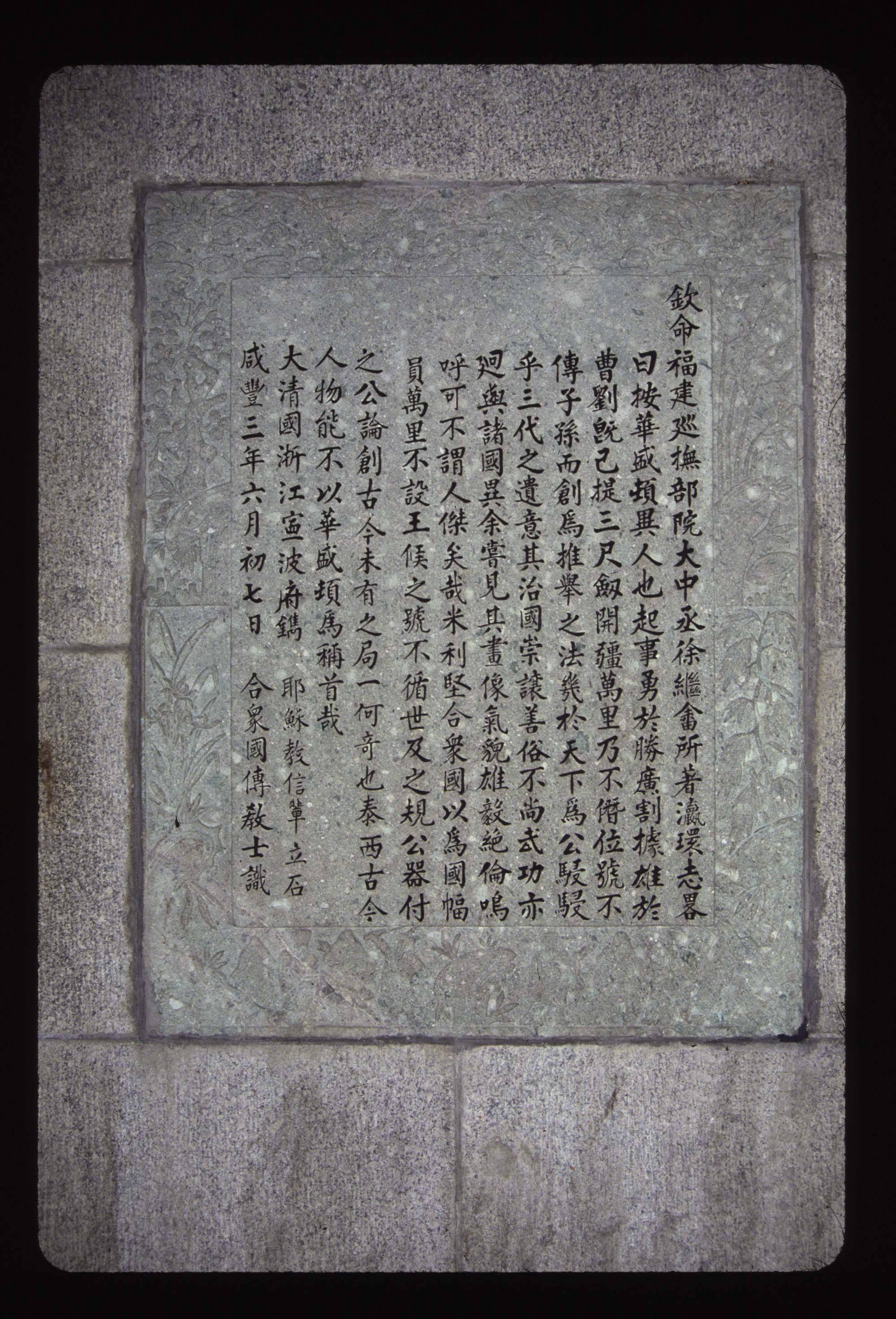
The inscription at the base of Washington Monument

In 1853, an excerpt about George Washington from Yinghuan zhilüe was inscribed on the stone donated to the Washington Monument by a group of Chinese Christians. The stone and the inscription can be seen at the base of the Washington Monument today, a fact that was mentioned by President Bill Clinton's 1998 speech in China.

== See also ==
- Hailu (Xie Qinggao/Yang Bingnan)
- Haiguo tuzhi (Wei Yuan)
