= Yuelu Publishing House =

Chinese publishing company

Hunan Yuelu Publishing House Co., Ltd. 湖南岳麓書社有限責任公司
- Company type: Publishing
- Industry: Ancient books publishing industry
- Founded: April, 1982
- Headquarters: People's Republic of China; No. 47, Aimin Road, Yuelu District, Changsha City, Hunan Province
- Parent: Central South Publishing and Media Group
- Website: http://www.ylss.cn/

Yuelu Publishing House (simplified Chinese: 岳麓书社; traditional Chinese: 岳麓書社; pinyin: Yuèlù Shūshè), full name Hunan Yuelu Publishing House Co., Ltd., is an ancient books publishing house in Changsha, Hunan, China. Established in April 1982，it is now one of the top 100 book publishing companies in China. Its comprehensive strength ranks among the best peers in the country.

== History ==
In 1982, Yuelu Publishing House was founded as a spin-off from Hunan People's Publishing House.

In 2008, Yuelu Publishing House was restructured into Hunan Yuelu Publishing House Co., Ltd.

In 2009, Yuelu Publishing House was rated as a national first-class publishing house by the General Administration of Press and Publication and was awarded the title of "Top 100 Book Publishing Units in China".

Since its establishment in 1982, Yuelu Publishing House has published a large number of books with both national significance and local characteristics, such as "Towards the World Series", "Chuanshan Complete Works", "Zeng Guofan Complete Works", "Zuo Zongtang Complete Works", "Wei Yuan Complete Works", etc.

Since 2006, it has undertaken a number of major national publishing projects including "Hunan Library", "Chinese Classics" and "Greater China Library", and has made smooth progress.

In 2009, Yuelu Publishing House became a member unit of the "National Qing History Project Publishing Consortium" and participated in the publication of the National Qing History Project.

In 2014, Yuelu Publishing House was selected as one of the “Top 100 Chinese Book Publishers with the Most Influential Impact in 2013”. The Chinese classical masterpieces published by Yuelu Publishing House ranked first among its peers in the national retail market.

In 2015, Yuelu Publishing House's "Selected Bamboo Slips Excavated in Hunan" won the "Fifth China Outstanding Publications Award".

== Current Status ==
Yuelu Publishing House is a professional ancient book publisher under the Central South Publishing and Media Group Co., Ltd., and one of the top 100 book publishing units in China.

The company is known for local ancient books compilation, popularization of classical masterpieces and history textbooks. It has become a professional ancient book publishing house with influence and characteristics at home and abroad.

Yuelu Publishing House’s service areas include Hunan local ancient books and documents, important historical books, popular readings of classical works, cultural relics and archaeology, monographs and research materials on ancient books and ancient culture by modern people, and middle school history textbooks. Books published by Yuelu Publishing House are also available internationally.
