= William Welton (missionary) =

English physician and missionary (1809–1858)

William Welton (1808–1858) was an English clergyman, physician, and surgeon. Born and raised in Wickham Market, Suffolk, England, Welton practiced as a surgeon for several years before shifting to study theology and become a medical missionary. He is credited with being the first Church Missionary Society doctor to go to China, as he went to Fuzhou (also Fuh-Chow or Foochow), China from 1849 to 1856. He was one of two missionaries whose actions instigated the Shen-kuang-szu Incident in 1850–1851.

== Early life and education ==
William Welton was born on 9 April 1808 in Suffolk, England, a son of Robert Welton and Ann, née Clutten, of Wickham Market, where he was baptized on 9 May 1808.

He went on to study medicine and obtained his Membership of the Royal Colleges of Surgeons of Great Britain and Ireland (M.R.C.S.). In 1831, he started working as a surgeon and upheld his practice for 12 years.

In 1842, Welton went to study theology at Caius College in Cambridge, England, from which he graduated with a Bachelor of Arts in 1847.

== Missionary work ==
=== Joining the Church Missionary Society ===
Welton sent a letter to the Church Missionary Society on 31 January 1847, offering himself as a Missionary Candidate. He specifically mentioned China and referred to Rev. E. Moore, Rev. G. Webster, and Rev. P. Salmon, who, in response, vouched for his moral character, piety, and qualifications for missionary work. Because of these correspondences, the Clerical Sub Committee of the Church Missionary Society (CMS) stated Welton should be recommended to the Committee of Correspondence as a Missionary Candidate.

Augustus Buckland in his "The Heroic in Missions: Pioneers in Six Fields" book acknowledges the rarity of starting service work later in life and its benefit:

"[Welton] was forty when he entered the service of the Society, an age at which few men seek the mission-field, and yet an age which, combined with experience such as Mr. Welton had enjoyed, fitted him well for a task requiring others qualities beside the ardour commonly associated with youth."

Welton was ordained deacon by the bishop of Hereford in 1848 and joined the Church Missionary Society (CMS) as a medical missionary.

=== Arrival in China and the Shen-kuang-szu incident ===
Welton left England on 5 November 1849. He founded the Fuzhou mission in May 1850, along with fellow CMS missionary Robert David Jackson. Upon arriving, they stayed on Zhongzhou Island with American missionaries before seeking residence within the walled city of Fuzhou. They thought Wushi Shan (Shan Wu-shih-shan) was the best location to reside, as the British consulate had been there for years and gave them a view of the city, as it was the tallest hill in the city. The two missionaries got permission from magistrate Xinglian to rent the Shen-kuang-szu (Shenguangsi) temple located on Wushi Shan.

The Chinese were angered and offended by this arrangement and tried to expel Welton and Jackson from the city, the start of what was known as the Shen-kuang-szu Incident. As the two moved into the temple, students and gentry protested, and continued for weeks, using a public letter, petitions, public meetings, pamphlets, harassment, and threats of violence. To avoid violence, the governor of Fujian, Xu Jiyu, and Viceroy, Liu Yunke, sent soldiers to guard the temple and discouraged the public from going to the missionaries for their preaching or medical care.

Welton and Jackson were not discouraged by these threats, feeling they were doing the Lord's work by staying in the city. In November 1850, Xu Jiyu offered them a different temple on the hill to stay in, known as Daoshanguan (Tao-shan-kuan). By 13 December 1850, Welton accepted the offer, and left Shen-kuang-szu by 21 January 1851. Soon after, Jackson was transferred to Ningbo (Ningpo). Welton worked alone in Fuzhou until 1855.

=== Medical aid ===
Despite initial tensions between the English missionaries and the Chinese people and the missionaries' difficulties in learning the Chinese language, Welton's medical aid helped smooth over this tension and gain trust from the people. Welton started a dispensary hospital in 1850, the first of many made by missionaries from the Church Missionary Society in China.

Welton dealt with many opium-smoking cases, often in attempted suicides. He had a stomach pump he used in an attempt to save victims, although they were sometimes used more to satisfy the patients' families than in hope for success. He wrote about opium usage in a journal entry from 30 September 1850:

"The evils of the practice cannot be too much stated. The Chinese themselves are aware of it, and many earnestly and eagerly, apply for medicines to assist them in breaking off the habit. Wives will come to me with their husbands, and see them give up the opium-pipe to me, which I always require, and rejoice at the prospect of getting medicine to be rid of a habit, which sooner or later entails poverty and misery on the whole family."

Welton performed at least two successful surgical operations to remove tumors.

His medical aid was sought after by the Chinese people. Day to day, he administered medicine to 80 to 100 patients. In 1855, his patients were estimated at 3,000. Patients of all social classes sought help from Welton and many traveled several miles to be seen by him.

== Death ==
Welton returned to England on 10 September 1856 in poor health. He died in London on 3 March 1858. He was buried on 9 March 1858, with his burial ceremony performed by Rev. Venn.

== Legacy ==
=== Translations ===
While Welton was in China, he translated different scriptures of the Bible into the Fuzhou dialect for distribution. They are as follows:

Year	Gospel	Publisher	Number of Copies (if available)
1852	Mark	Private Funds	
1854	Matthew	B & F.B.S.	130
1854	John	B & F.B.S.	90
1855	Acts	B & F.B.S.	200
1855	Romans	B & F.B.S.	100
1856	New Testament*	A.B.S.	
*Completed with Rev. L. B. Peet Abbreviations of Names of Publishers: B & F.B.S. = British and Foreign Bible Society A.B.S. = American Bible Society

=== Converts ===
While he saw no converts throughout his seven years of service, he laid the ground for more missionaries that came to China after him. Notably, George Smith, described to have Welton's spirit, came to China in August 1858, and by 1861, 4 people were baptized. In the end, the mission that Welton started baptized 10,000 people.

One of the original four converts, Dang Dangbian (Tang Tang-pien), is described to be a convert of Welton's, although he was baptized by the American Methodists.
