= Huang Juezi =

- Huang Juezi
- Traditional Chinese: 黃爵滋
- Simplified Chinese: 黄爵滋
Transcriptions
Standard Mandarin
- Hanyu Pinyin: Huáng Juézī

Courtesy name
- Chinese: 德成
Transcriptions
Standard Mandarin
- Hanyu Pinyin: Dé Chéng

Pseudonym
- Simplified Chinese: 树斋
Transcriptions
Standard Mandarin
- Hanyu Pinyin: Shù Zhāi

Huang Juezi (26 January 1793 – 19 December 1853) was a Chinese Qing dynasty scholar and civil servant and a fervent opponent of the opium trade. His 1838 official memorial to the Daoguang Emperor detailing the problems caused by opium helped lead to the appointment of Lin Zexu as Imperial Commissioner responsible for tackling the opium problem, a move that would ultimately result in the First Opium War with Great Britain.

== Early life and career ==
Born in Yihuang County, Jiangxi Province, by the age of seven Huang could compose classical poetry. In 1808 during the reign of the Qing Jiaqing Emperor he entered the government school and in 1823 graduated as a chosen scholar or Jìnshì (进士/進士). Thereafter he held a series of positions at the Imperial Court including Imperial Censor (御史Yù shǐ), Minister of Works (工科给事中Gōngkē gěi shì zhōng) and Minister Herald (鸿胪寺卿/鴻臚寺卿 Hóng lú sì qīng).

== Petition to the emperor ==
By the early years of the Daoguang Emperor's reign, the pernicious influence of opium had spread all across China, leading to a serious outflow of silver bullion and a society wide crisis. In 1838, Huang, by now Minister Herald, presented the emperor with a petition entitled "Plug the leak firmly to grow the country" (严塞漏卮以培国本疏 Yán sè lòu è yǐ péi guó běn shū) - the leak in question being of silver bullion. In his memorial Huang asked the emperor to grant a one-year period of grace after which ordinary citizens who continued to smoke opium would face the death penalty while officials would face the same punishment with their offspring banned from sitting the imperial examination. He mistakenly believed that Britain already had death penalty for opium smokers. The petition gained the support of officials including Lin Zexu and Tao Zhu, as well as praise from the emperor himself. On the eve of the First Opium War, Huang knew that control of China's coastal regions was vital to the suppression of the opium trade. He made two trips to Fujian Province and presented the emperor with a map showing suggested coastal defences, the Hǎifáng túbiǎo (海防图表).

== Later career ==
When the First Opium War broke out in 1839, Huang joined Deng Tingzhen in resisting the British army then later took charge of the Yuzhang Confucian Academy (豫章书院). He died in Beijing in 1853; thereafter his body was returned to Yihuang County for burial.
