= Shen-kuang-szu Incident =

Conflict in Fuzhou, China (1850–1851)

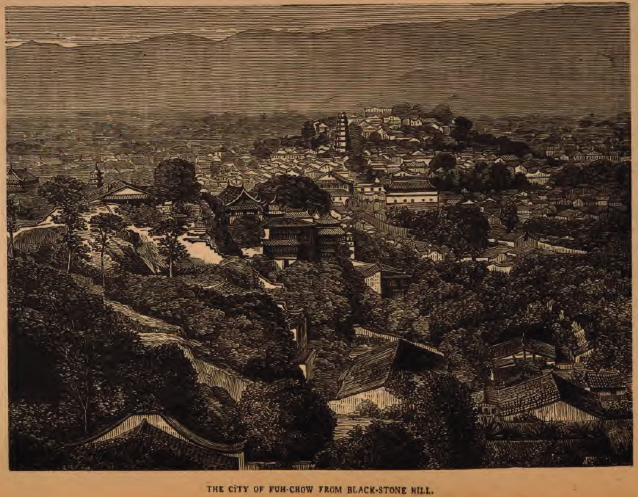
View of Fuzhou from Wu-shih-shan in the 19th century

The Shen-kuang-szu Incident (Chinese: 神光寺事件; Pinyin: Shénguāngsì Shìjiàn; Foochow Romanized: Sìng-guŏng-sê Sê̤ṳ-giông) was a series of events that took place between 1850 and 1851 in Fuzhou, China and was marked as one of the earliest conflicts between local Chinese and foreign Protestant missionaries. It began in June 1850 when two English missionaries rented rooms in a temple known as the Shen-kuang-szu on Wu-shih-shan within the walled city of Fuzhou. In the months that followed, local Chinese gentry and officials attempted in various ways to evict the missionaries from the hill, but all their efforts apparently failed. The controversy was settled the following year in October with the terms of the agreement stating that the missionaries were allowed to stay behind. This led to great discontentment amongst the local gentry and eventually foreshadowed yet another more important missionary incident—the 1878 Wu-shih-shan Case.

== Background ==
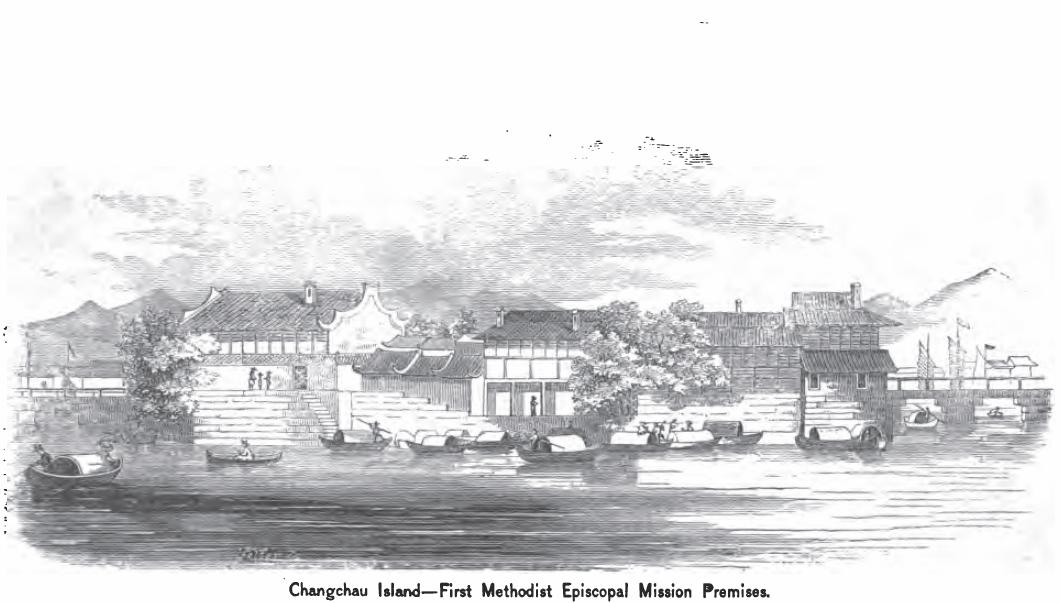
Zhongzhou Island, ca. 1850

Following the footsteps of the American Board of Commissioners for Foreign Missions (ABCFM) and the Methodist Episcopal Mission (MEM), the English Church Missionary Society established a mission at Fuzhou during the spring of 1850. During first few days since their arrival they resided temporarily on Zhongzhou Island (中洲岛), together with their American predecessors. As the Methodists had moved south of the River Min and the ABCFM northwards into the Nantai, the CMS missionaries, Robert David Jackson and William Welton, decided to seek assistance from the British consulate to secure premises within the walled city (which is located within the present day Gulou District). They considered Wu-shih-shan (乌石山; Black Stone Hill), the tallest hill of Fuzhou, to be the most desirable site not only because the British consulate had been located there for years already but also because, living on the hill, they would "never go out or come in without being occasionally reminded of the vastness" of their work.

== The Incident ==
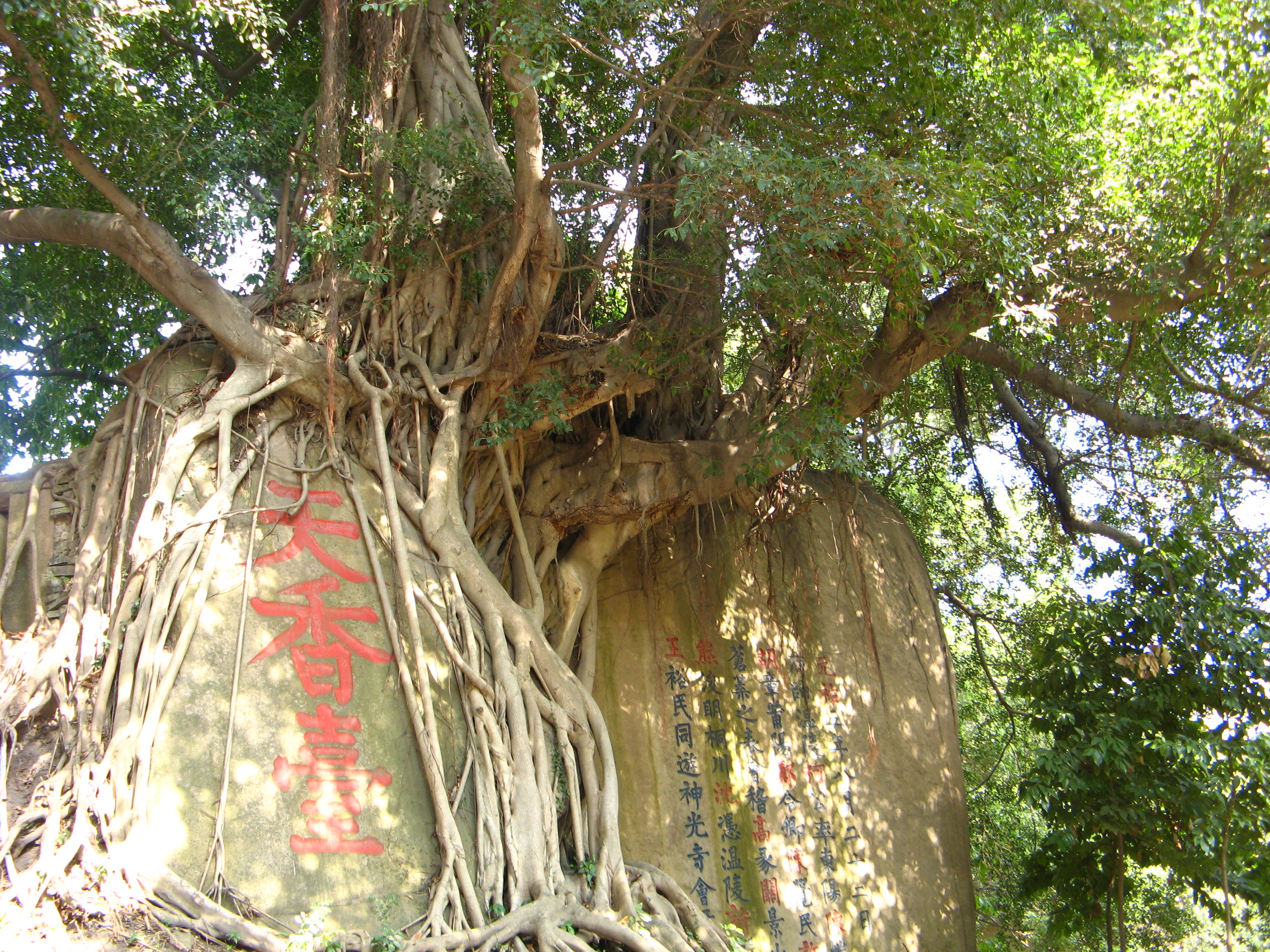
Tian Xiang Tai (天香台), the former site of Shen-kuang-szu

When Jackson and Welton brought with them a letter from the bishop of Hong Kong to the consul in June 1850, expressing their desire to reside within the city, Dr. William Raymond Gingell, who was the then consular interpreter in Fuzhou, provided assistance. Having formerly been informed about the availability of a temple on Wu-shih-shan called Shen-kuang-szu (神光寺), Gingell arranged a meeting with the county magistrate Xinglian (兴廉) to discuss about its rental opportunities. Without putting much detailed thought into the matter, Xinglian placed his seal on the agreement.

The Chinese, however, were not pleased with the outcome of the meeting, protesting that foreigners other than consular officers should not be permitted to reside within the walled city. Two days after the conclusion of the rental agreement, Gingell began receiving urgent communications from Xinglian and other Chinese officials requesting to undo the rental agreement at Shen-kuang-szu. Gingell refused, taking the position that foreigners had the Treaty rights to reside within the city, and that the magistrate himself had already placed his seal on the agreement.

By the time the missionaries had moved into the Shen-kuang-szu premises, the tensions soon escalated to a large outburst of protesting amongst the students and gentry which lasted for weeks. This protest took many forms: a public letter from the gentry and people of Fuzhou to the British consular officers, petitions to the Qing government, public meetings, the posting of placards and the publication of pamphlets, and even harassment and threats of violence. The governor of Hong Kong Sir George Bonham informed the Chinese government that he would not ask the missionaries to leave the city, and that the Fuzhou authorities should be held responsible for their safety. On August 30, 1850, British Foreign Secretary Lord Palmerston also gave approval to the actions of the British officers in China regarding this matter.

The Fuzhou authorities were then in a dilemma: on one hand, to compromise with the foreigners was to add fuel to the flames of xenophobia and enrage the common people who might carry out further violence; on the other hand, to deny the foreigners what they considered as their treaty rights could also provoke Great Britain into using military force to settle the issue. On the handling of this case, great dissension existed amongst Chinese officials. The governor-general of Yun-Gui Lin Zexu (林则徐), who had then returned to his hometown in Fuzhou for retirement, played a key role amongst the native gentry in taking a strong position demanding that the foreigners be expelled by force. Such a proposal was never accepted, however, by the governor of Fujian Xu Jiyu (徐继畬) and the governor-general Liu Yunke (刘韵珂), who believed the issue could be settled in a peaceful manner. To avoid violent actions, Xu Jiyu and Liu Yunke sent soldiers to guard the temple premises, but they also discouraged people from going to the missionaries to listen to their preaching or seek medical care from them, and forbade any carpenters or masons from repairing the rather dilapidated temple, in the hope that the foreigners would themselves give up on the premises. In spite of these difficulties the missionaries refused to leave, believing that the Lord's work required their presence in the city.

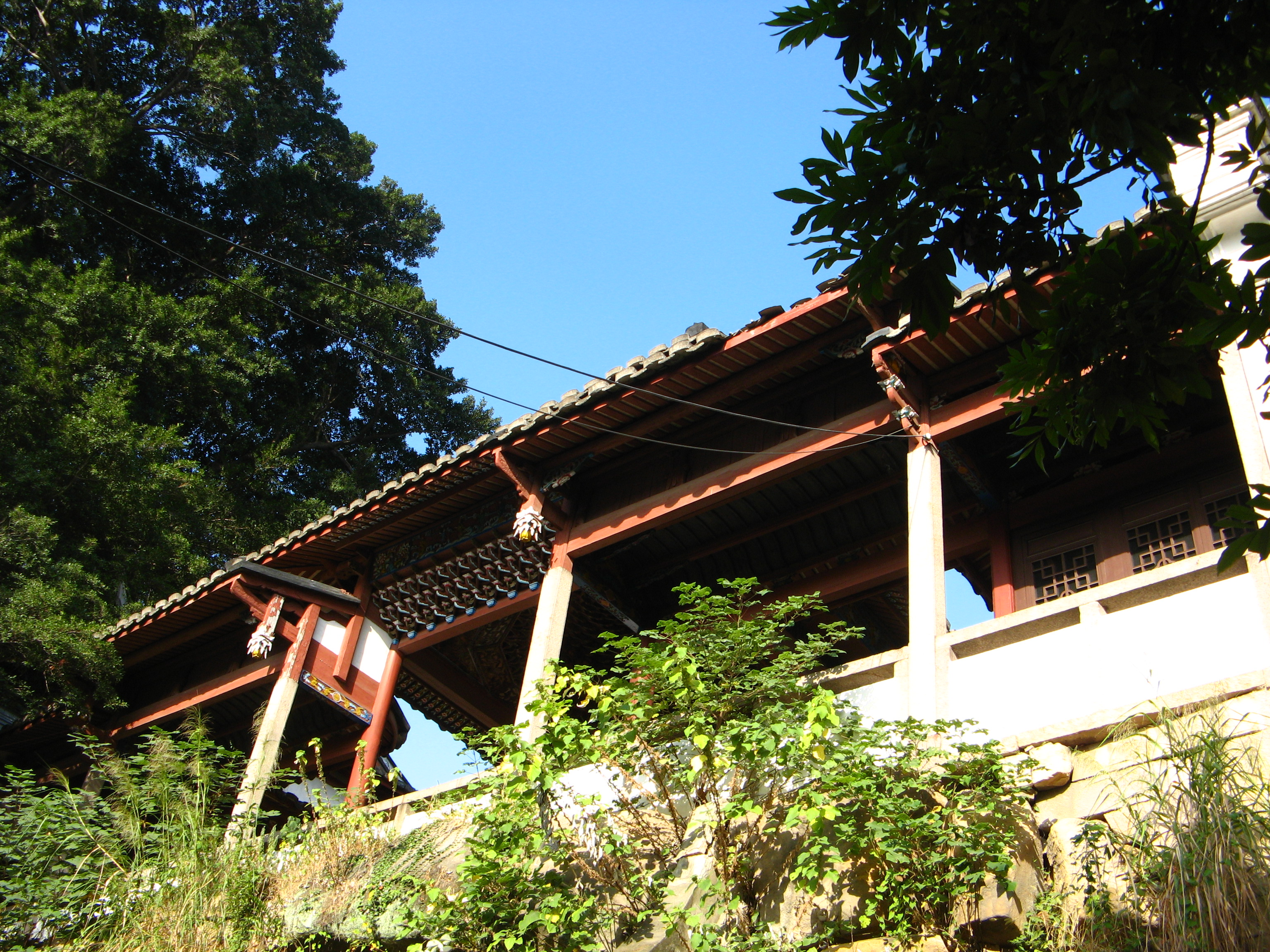
Tao-shan-kuan today

Caught between the demands of the Fuzhou gentry and the stubbornness of the foreigners, Xu Jiyu offered the two English missionaries another temple on Wu-shih-shan known as Tao-shan-kuan (道山观) in November 1850. Tao-shan-kuan had at one stage been rented as a residence for the interpreter of the British consulate, and this had not been objected to by the Fuzhou gentry. By December 13 Welton had decided to accept the exchange, and by January 21, 1851, the two missionaries relinquished Shen-kuang-szu.

Meanwhile, Lin Zexu, together with other Chinese officials outside of Fuzhou, submitted official memorials to the Qing court criticizing the Fuzhou officials for their mishandling of the Shen-kuang-szu Case. These memorials especially accused Xu Jiyu of favoring the foreigners and thwarting the will of the common people rather than siding with them to resist the foreigners, which aroused the wrath of the Xianfeng Emperor. On October 30, 1850, an edict was issued ordering the dismissal of Xinglian. Xu Jiyu was reprimanded in January 1851 and relieved from office by June.

== Consequences ==
With Xu Jiyu having placed his official seal on the Tao-shan-kuan rental agreement, Fuzhou became the first Chinese treaty port (before Guangzhou) in which Protestant missionaries were eventually permitted to reside within the walled city. During the next three decades Wu-shih-shan had been the mission center of the Church Missionary Society in Fujian. Although the controversy of the Shen-kuang-szu Incident was supposedly settled in October 1851, a strong undercurrent of discontent still existed amongst the Chinese populace, leading to yet another larger-scale conflict in 1878 known as Wu-shih-shan Case that resulted in the final eviction of the English missionaries from the walled city of Fuzhou in 1880.
