= Teng Shih K'ou Congregational Church =

- Teng Shih K'ou Church
- 燈市口公理會教堂
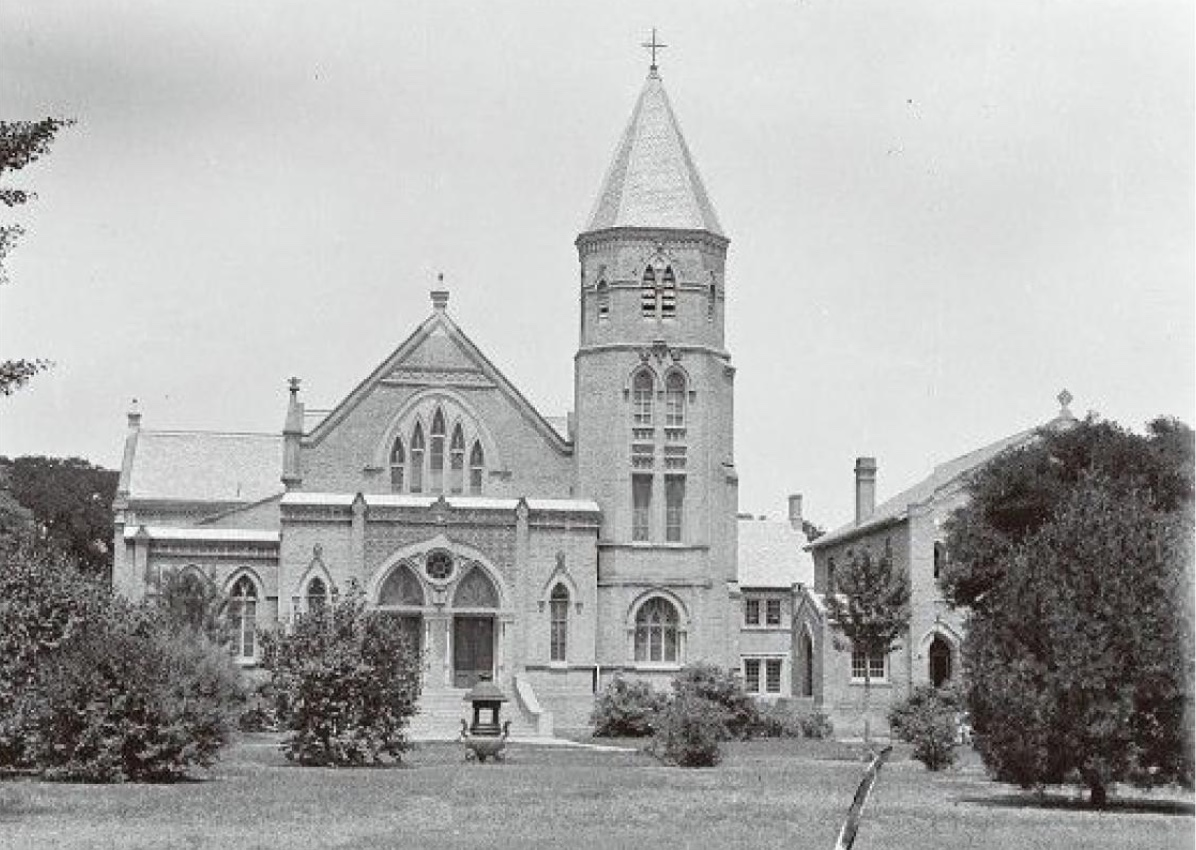
- Teng Shih K'ou Church in 1919
- Location: Dongcheng District, Beijing
- Country: China
- Denomination: Congregational

History
- Status: Church
- Founded: 1864
- Founder: Eliza Jane Gillett Bridgman

Architecture
- Functional status: Demolished
- Style: Gothic Revival

Specifications
- Materials: Brick, stone

Teng Shih K'ou Congregational Church (Chinese: 燈市口公理會教堂; pinyin: Dēngshìkǒu Gōnglǐhuì Jiàotáng; Wade–Giles: Têng Shih K'ou Kung-li-hui Chiao-t'ang), often simply referred to as the Teng Shih K'ou Church (燈市口教堂), was a Congregational church located at Dengshikou (Teng Shih K'ou) in Dongcheng District, Beijing. It was the largest Protestant church in Beijing until it was demolished during the Cultural Revolution.

== History ==
Built in 1864, as part of Bridgman Girls' College founded by Eliza Jane Gillett Bridgman, the Teng Shih K'ou Church was the oldest of the American Board Mission churches in Beijing. According to Sidney D. Gamble, it was "a beautiful example of Gothic architecture". The membership roll of the church included some three hundred families, notable for its well-trained pastor and a large number of well-to-do congregants.^{:338}

The church was under the care of Henry Blodget (1825–1903), before being burnt down in 1900 during the Boxer Rebellion. In 1902, it was rebuilt by William Scott Ament.^{:324} During the Republican era (1912–1949), the church was involved in numerous charitable activities. For instance, a speech in English given by Nellie Yu Roung Ling took place at the church in 1921, in aid of the "School for Poor Children" charity funds.

In 1958, in order to support the Great Leap Forward campaign, the sixty or so churches in Beijing were forced to combine their worship services at four facilities, Teng Shih K'ou Church being one of them. During the Cultural Revolution (1966–1976), the church was demolished by Red Guards.
