= Xu Jiyu =

Chinese scholar (1795–1873)

Xu Jiyu (Chinese: 徐繼畬; pinyin: Xú Jìyú; 1795–1873), was a high-ranking Chinese official and geographer during the late Qing dynasty. He is mostly known as the author of A Short Account of the Maritime Circuit (1849) and is widely regarded as an early participant of the Self-Strengthening Movement.

== Early life ==
Born in Wutai County, Xu came from a scholarly family in Shanxi province; his father Xu Rundi had obtained the highest degree in the imperial examinations and served as a secretary in the Grand Secretariat. The young Xu was fond of studying and joined his father in Beijing, where he met a number of prominent scholars of the day. Xu studied under the direction of his father and became an adherent of the Wang Yangming school of thought.

== Bureaucratic career ==
Having obtained the intermediary degree in the imperial exams in 1813, Xu Jiyu was initially unsuccessful in advancing in the exam system. In 1826, Xu Jiyu was finally awarded the highest degree in the imperial examinations and four years later he was appointed to a position in the prestigious Hanlin Academy. In the academy, he worked under the direction of the chancellor, Mujangga, with whom he would work closely during following years. In 1836, he became prefect of Xunzhou in Guangxi province. During his tenure as a prefect Xu Jiyu submitted a number of official memorials on domestic reform, which impressed the Daoguang Emperor and further helped Xu to rapidly rise through the ranks of the Qing civil service. Following the outbreak of the First Opium War, Xu was appointed circuit intendant of a coastal prefecture in Fujian province, where he witnessed the war with his own eyes, an experience that convinced him that China needed to learn more about the West.

After the Opium War, Xu Jiyu was closely associated with grand councilor Mujangga's "appeasement" faction in the imperial court and he was responsible for carrying out Mujangga's policies in the south. In 1846, Xu was appointed governor of Fujian Province, where he took charge of managing the opening of two ports that had been opened as a consequence of the Treaty of Nanjing. In Fuzhou, Xu Jiyu frequently met with foreign residents, who provided him with information on the world outside China.

The ascension of the Xianfeng Emperor in 1850 and the subsequent ousting of the Mujangga faction from the government would reverse the fortunes of Xu Jiyu. In 1851, he was dismissed from his post on account of his mishandling the case of Shen-kuang-szu Incident and he was forced to retire to his home province, where he stayed for almost a decade and a half. Xu's fortunes again changed after Empress Dowager's Cixi's coup d'état in 1861 and four years later, Xu was brought back into service, first working in the newly established foreign office, the Zongli Yamen, and later being put in charge of the language school Tongwenguan. In 1869 Xu retired to his home province, where he died four years later.

During the Cultural Revolution (1966–76), Xu's tomb was reportedly smashed and the clothes on his corpse stripped off, according to a 2015 report in state-controlled media.

== Scholarly work ==
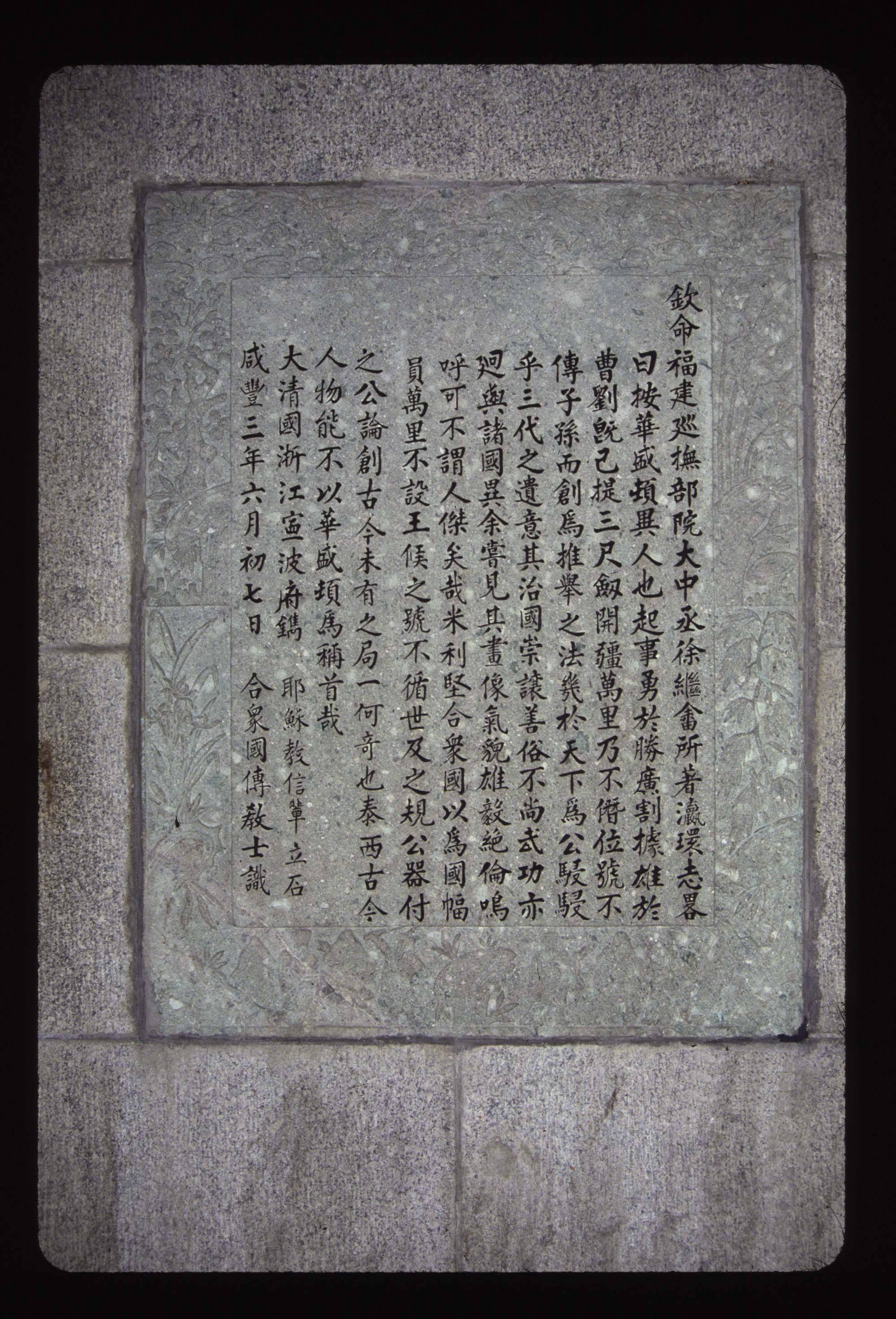
The inscription at the base of Washington Monument

During his tenure in Fujian province, Xu Jiyu had the opportunity to interact with a number of Westerners who had just arrived in the province, such as the American missionary David Abeel, and the British consular officials, Rutherford Alcock and George Tradescant Lay, father of Horatio Nelson Lay. Xu collected information on the West both from missionary literature in Chinese and from his direct contact with Westerners in his official business. This information was the basis of his A Short Account of the Maritime Circuit (Yinghuan zhilüe, 瀛環志略) in 1849. Although this work is lesser known than the Illustrated Treatise on the Maritime Kingdoms published in 1843 by his contemporary Wei Yuan, A Short Account was more systematic in its description of Western geography. These works by Xu and Wei, ironically, were initially more influential in Japan than in their own country, where Wei's book went out of print, and Xu's was reprinted in 1866 and was also republished in Japan. Eventually these books changed the Sinocentric view of the geographical world.

In 1853, an excerpt about George Washington from A Short Account was inscribed on the stone donated to the Washington Monument by a group of Chinese Christians. The stone and the inscription can be seen at the base of the Washington Monument today, a fact that was mentioned by President Clinton's 1998 speech in China.

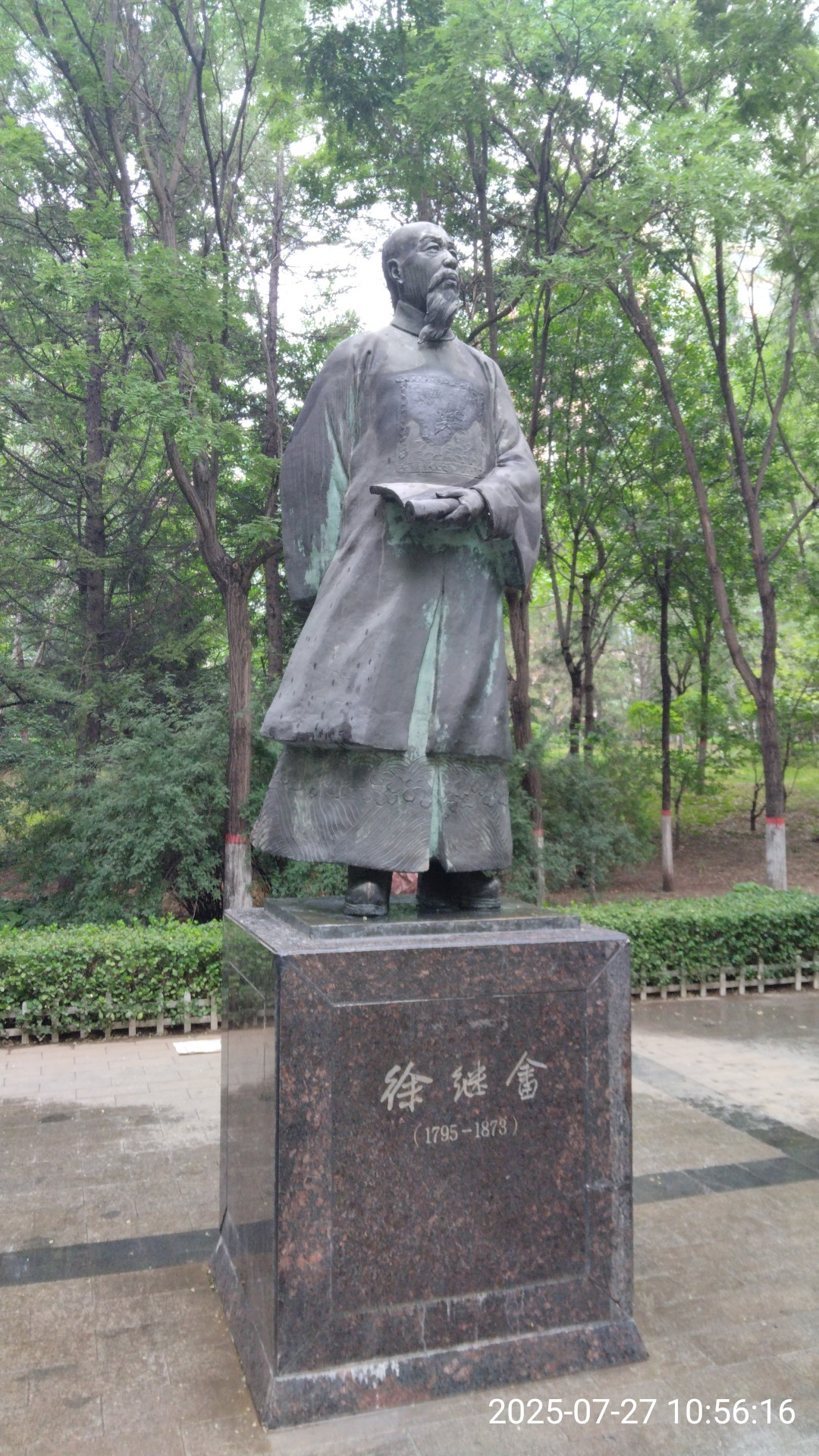
Statue of Xu Jiyu located in Yifen Park, Taiyuan, Shanxi, China

== Sources ==
- Drake, Fred W. "A Mid-Nineteenth-Century Discovery of the Non-Chinese World." Modern Asian Studies 6, no. 2 (1972): 205-24.
- * Hao, Yen-p'ing; Wang, Erh-min (1980). Fairbank, John King; Twitchett, Denis Crispin (eds.). The Cambridge History of China: Late Ch'ing 1800-1911. Vol. 11. Cambridge University Press. ISBN 978-0521-2202-93.
- Baidu Baike Article on Xu Jiyu (in Chinese)
- Studies of Xujiyu (in Chinese)
