= Eliza Jane Gillett Bridgman =

American missionary in China (1805–1871)

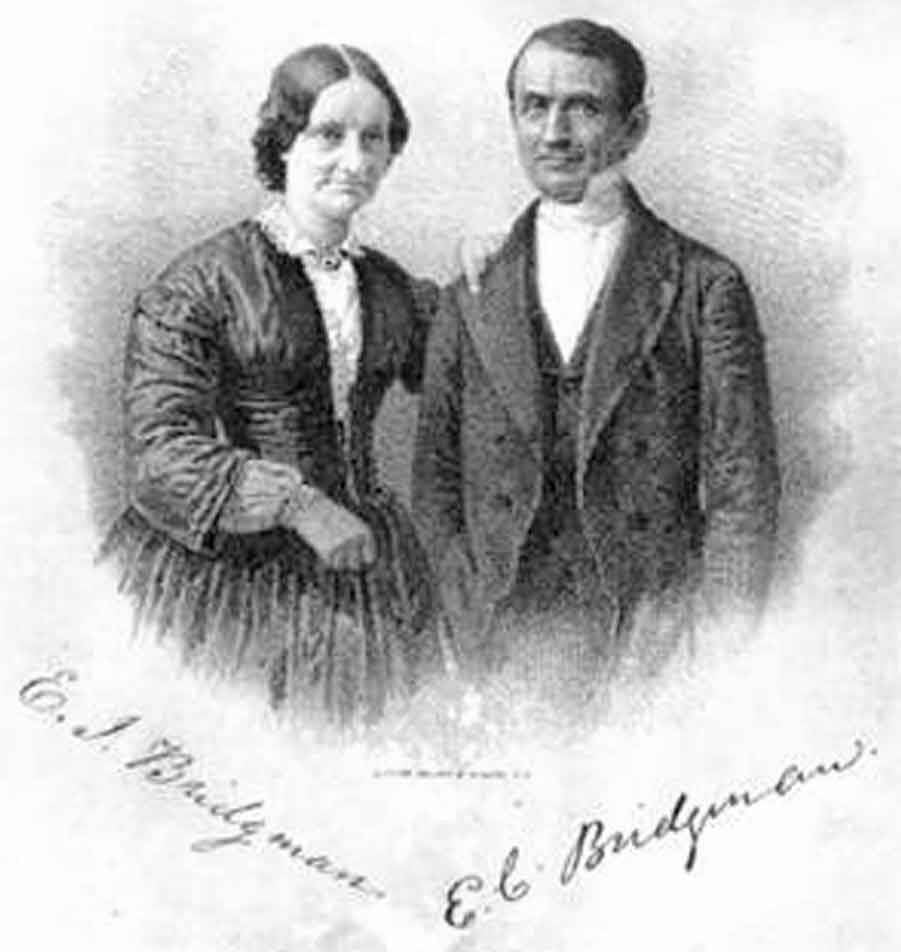

Personal life
- Born: 6 May 1806 Derby, Connecticut
- Died: 10 November 1871 Shanghai, China
- Spouse: Elijah Coleman Bridgman

Religious life
- Religion: Protestant Christian

Eliza Jane Gillett Bridgman (1805–1871) was one of the first American female missionaries to live and work in China. She arrived in Hong Kong in 1845 and that same year married Elijah Coleman Bridgman, the first American Protestant missionary in China. She was a teacher and educator. She founded schools for Chinese girls in Shanghai and Beijing, often with her own money. She died in Shanghai.

== Early life ==
Bridgman was born May 6, 1805 in Derby, Connecticut, the youngest of nine children of Canfield and Hannah Gillett (sometimes Gillet). Her father died when she was ten and she moved with her mother to New Haven. She graduated from a boarding school at age sixteen and became an assistant teacher at the school. She had a religious experience in 1821. In 1823, she moved with her mother to New York City and in 1827 became the principal of a boarding school. She was appointed to be a missionary teacher in China by the Protestant Episcopal Church on November 14, 1843 and on December 14, 1843, departed New York on the ship Horatio. On board were nine missionaries, including Bishop William Jones Boone Sr. and two other unmarried female teachers, Mary J. Morse of Boston and Emma G. Jones of Mobile, Alabama. The three women were among the first unmarried female missionaries sent to China.

At the end of the First Opium War (1839-1842), the British imposed the Treaty of Nanking on China, the first of the "unequal treaties." The treaty opened several port cities in China to foreign businessmen and missionaries and ceded Hong Kong Island to the United Kingdom. Bridgman's party arrived at Hong Kong on April 24, 1845, after a journey of more than four months. The Nanking Treaty was in effect, enabling them to establish a mission in one of the treaty ports.

== Missionary in China ==
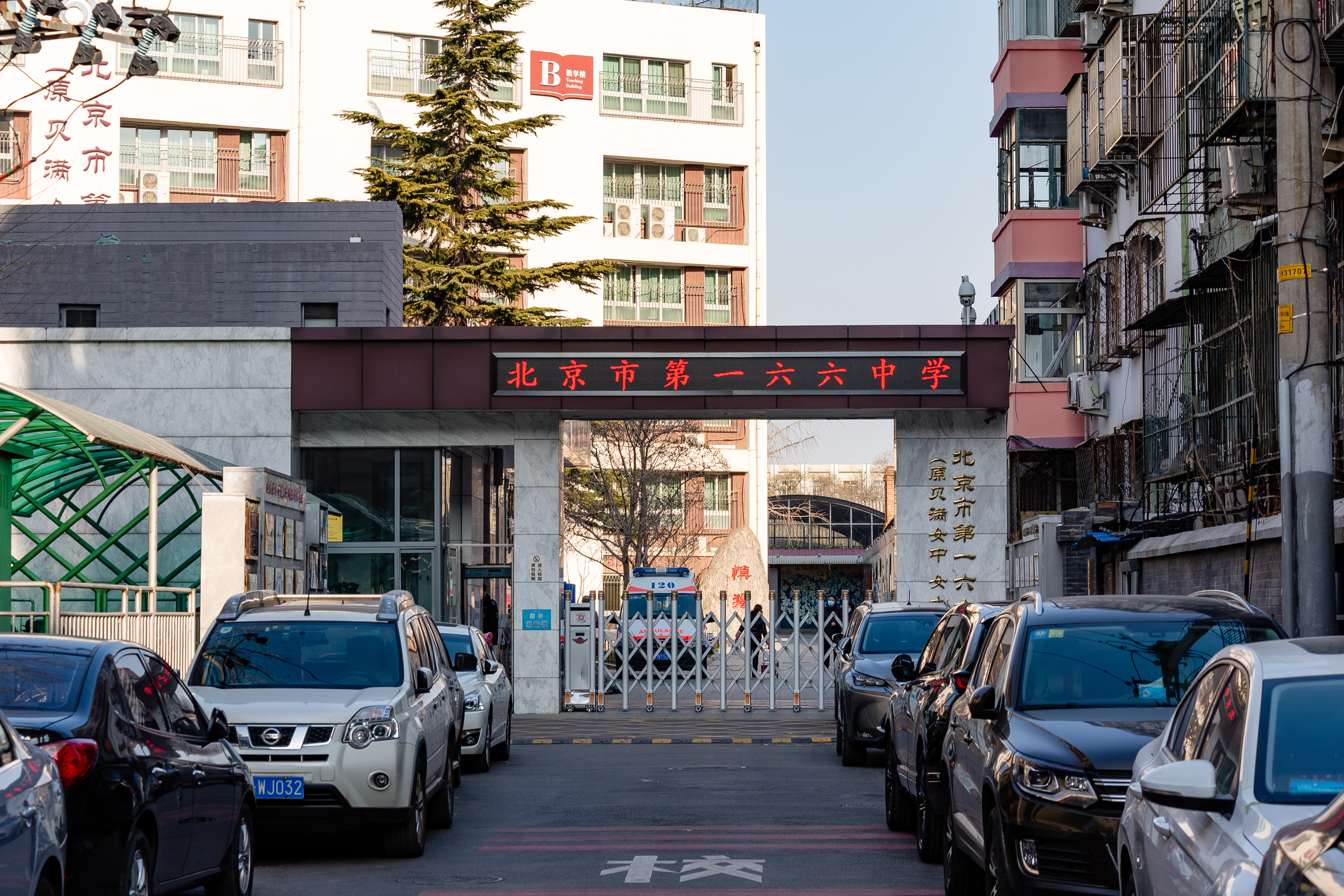
Beijing No. 166 Middle School was founded by Bridgman in 1864

After arriving in Hong Kong, Eliza soon met missionary Elijah Coleman Bridgman. Bridgman believed that Eliza was his answer to his prayer for a wife; he proposed and the two were married on June 28, 1845, in Colonial Chapel in Hong Kong. He was 44 and she was 40 years old and neither had ever been married before. After marrying, she changed her affiliation to the American Board of Commissioners for Foreign Missions (ABCFM), and the Congregational Church. Together, the Bridgmans began their missionary work in Canton where she studied the Cantonese dialect of the Chinese language. The couple adopted two young Chinese girls and in June 1847 moved to Shanghai. In 1850, Eliza created the first Protestant day school for girls in Shanghai. She recruited students by going house-to-house and hired native Chinese teachers.

In February 1852, the Bridgmans began the journey back to the United States due to the poor health of Elijah. He recovered and in April 1853, the couple arrived back in Shanghai. During her visit to the U.S., Eliza wrote a book titled The Daughters of China. By 1859, she had three girls' schools in Shanghai with about 75 students. Elijah died in 1861 and she also suffered from poor health. She returned to the United States in 1862, and her school was transferred to the Presbyterian Mission. She was badly injured while in the United States by a runaway horse. During her visit to the U.S., she wrote a biography of her husband titled The Life and Labors of Elijah Coleman Bridgman.

Another war between China and Europeans, the Second Opium War, and another unequal treaty, the Convention of Peking, opened up the previously forbidden city of Peking (now Beijing) to foreigners and missionaries. In 1864, the widowed Eliza Bridgman returned to China and settled in Peking. In the face of much Chinese opposition to foreigners and the education of women, she created the Bridgman Academy. She provided funds for the land, buildings, and operation of the school and contributed $12,500 to the ABCFM to establish its missionary headquarters in Peking. The Teng Shih K'ou Congregational Church was built in the same year, as part of the college. The academy later became the Women's College of Yenching University and is credited with educating a large number of female Chinese leaders.

In October 1868, suffering from poor health, she returned to Shanghai. She invested another $5,000 there for a girls' school. She died in Shanghai on 10 November 1871 and is buried there, next to her husband.

== Works ==
- Elijah Coleman Bridgman, ed. Eliza Jane Gillett Bridgman (1864). The Pioneer of American Missions in China: The Life and Labors of Elijah Coleman Bridgman.
- Eliza Jane Gillett (1853) Daughters of China; or, Sketches of Domestic Life in the Celestial Empire
