= He Changling =

Chinese writer (1785–1848)

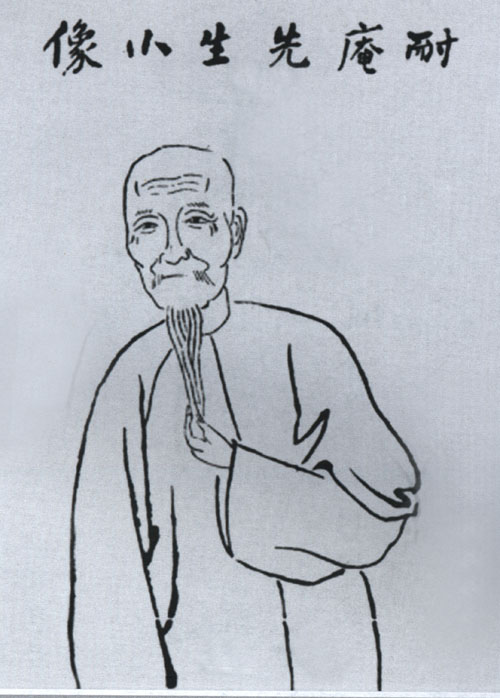
He Changling

He Changling (simplified Chinese: 贺长龄; traditional Chinese: 賀長齡; pinyin: Hè Chánglíng; Wade–Giles: He Ch'angling) (March 18, 1785—July 6, 1848), courtesy name Ougen (耦耕), was a Chinese scholar and official of the Qing dynasty from Changsha, Hunan. In 1808, he obtained the highest degree in the imperial examination and the following year he entered the prestigious Hanlin Academy in Beijing.

Drawing on his extensive experience in the Qing government, he became a prominent spokesman of the statecraft school, which was concerned with the practical application of Confucian scholarship. One of He Changling's students was Zuo Zongtang.

== Huangchao Jingshi Wenbian ==
Together with Wei Yuan, He Changling edited an influential anthology on statecraft, known as the "Collected essays about statecraft of the Qing" (清經世文編, Qīng Jīngshì Wénbiān), originally titled Huángcháo Jīngshì Wénbiān (皇朝經世文編). 120 scrolls long, the collection includes more than 2000 documents about practical issues of governance, based on the editors' experience from the beginning of the Qing dynasty until the Daoguang era in the mid-Qing dynasty. A similar book existed for the Ming dynasty, called the Ming Jingshi Wenbian.

The Wenbian contained eight chapters and 56 subchapters:

1. Education (學術, Xuéshù)
2. Human resources (治體, Zhìtǐ)
3. Officialdom (吏政, Lìzhèng)
4. Ministry of Revenue (戶政, Hùzhèng)
5. Ministry of Rites (禮政, Lǐzhèng)
6. Ministry of War (兵政, Bīngzhèng)
7. Ministry of Justice (刑政, Xíngzhèng)
8. Ministry of Works (工政, Gōngzhèng)
