= Elijah Coleman Bridgman =

American missionary to China (1801–1861

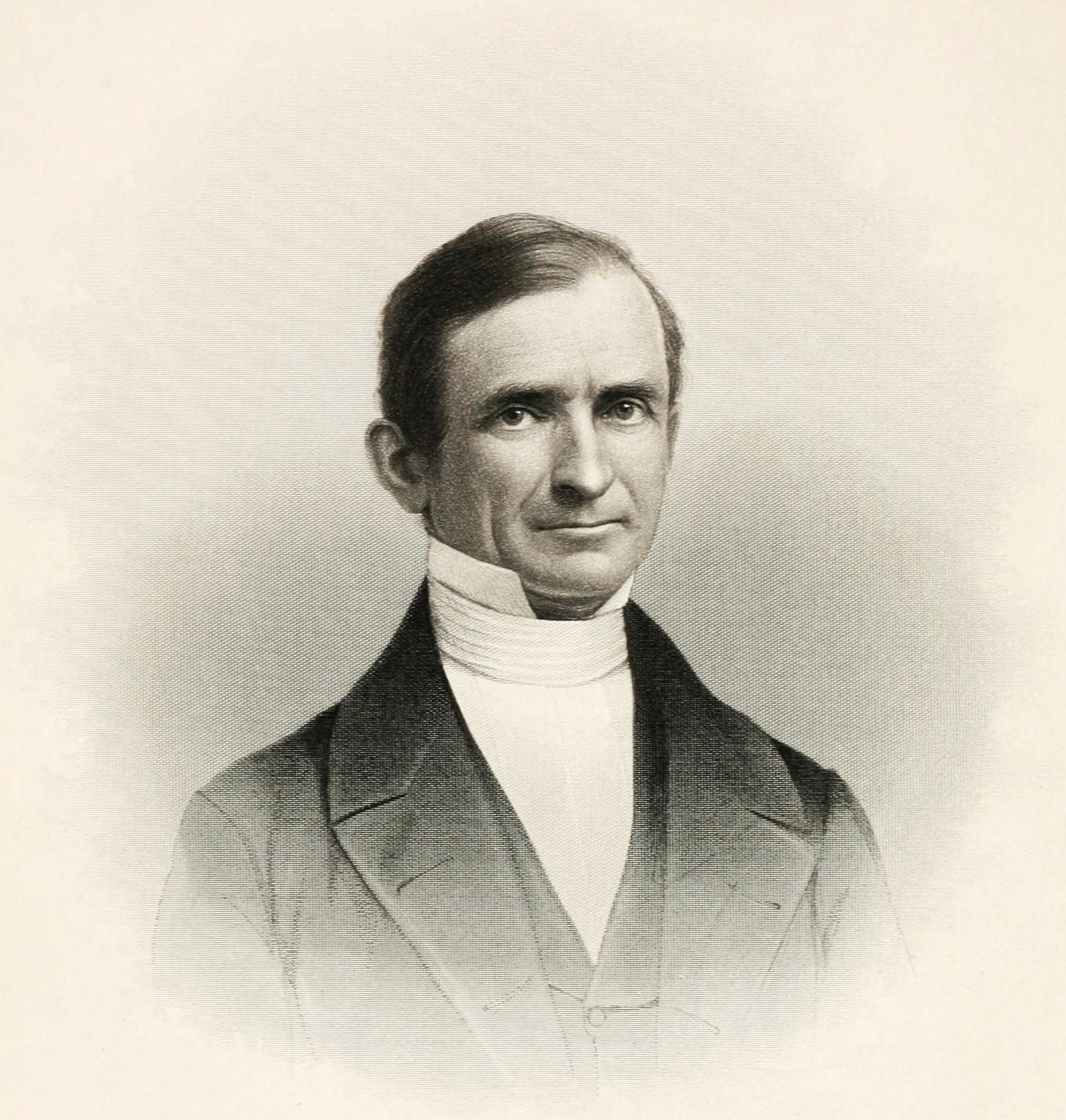
- Missionary to China
- Born: April 22, 1801; Belchertown, Massachusetts, U.S.
- Died: November 2, 1861 (aged 60); Shanghai, Qing Dynasty
- Education: Amherst College Andover Theological School
- Title: D.D.
- Spouse(s): Eliza Jane Bridgeman (née Gillett)
- Parent(s): Theodore Bridgman; Lucretia Warner

Elijah Coleman Bridgman (April 22, 1801 – November 2, 1861) was the first American Protestant Christian missionary appointed to China. He served with the American Board of Commissioners for Foreign Missions. One of the first few Protestant missionaries to arrive in China prior to the First Opium War, Bridgman was a pioneering scholar and cultural intermediary, and laid the foundations for American sinology. His work shaped the development of early Sino-American relations. He contributed immensely to America's knowledge and understanding of Chinese civilization through his extensive writings on the country's history and culture in publications such as The Chinese Repository — the world's first major journal of sinology, which he began and edited. Bridgman became America's first "China expert." Among his other works was the first Chinese language history of the United States: "Short Account of the United States of America" (or "Meilike Heshengguo Zhilüe") and "The East-West Monthly Examiner" (or "Dong Hsi Yang Kao Meiyue Tongji Zhuan"). As a translator he contributed greatly to the formulation of America's first treaty with the Chinese government under the Qing Dynasty.

== Early life ==
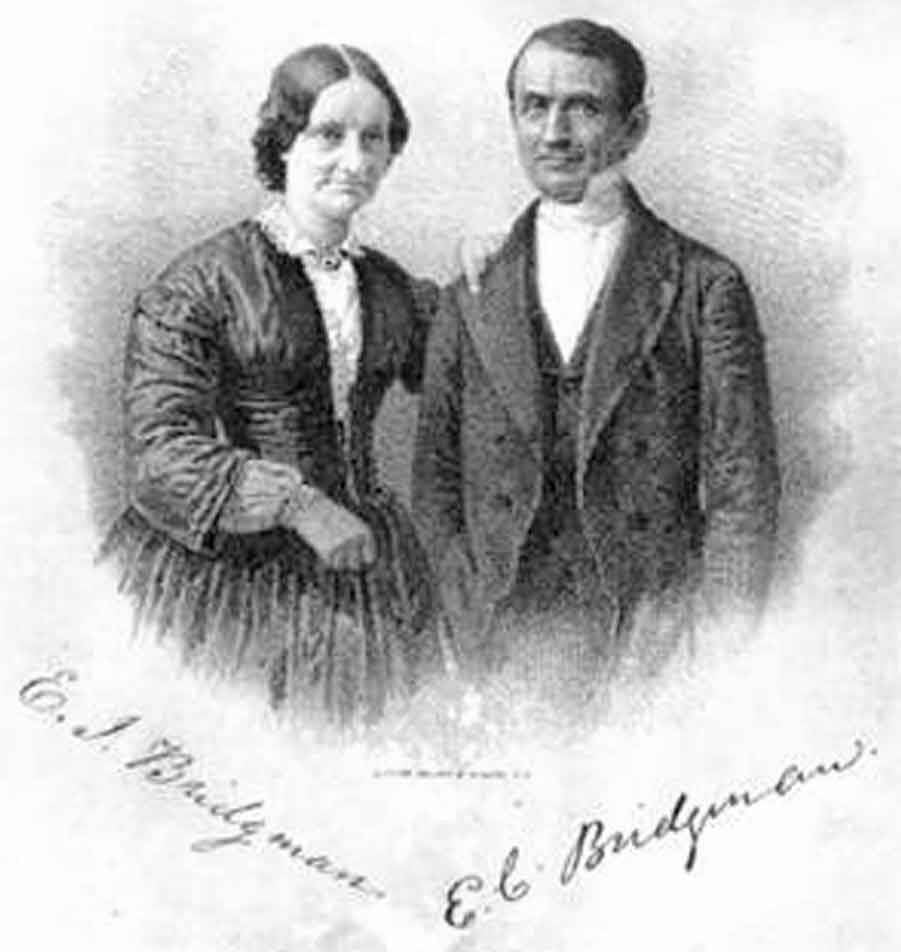
Eliza Jane and Elijah Coleman Bridgman

Bridgman was born in Belchertown, Massachusetts to a Lieutenant Theodore Bridgman and his wife Lucretia (Warner) who owned a farm at Pond Hill which had belonged to his father, grandfather, and great-grandfather, Ebenezer. The home in which he was born remains standing on Bay Road, immediately south of Dwight. Elijah graduated from Amherst College (1826) and Andover Theological Seminary (1829).

== Missionary career in China ==
In response to the urging of Robert Morrison of the London Missionary Society and the Christian American merchant David Olyphant, who offered free sailing passage, Bridgman was ordained and was appointed for service in China by the American Board of Commissioners for Foreign Missions on October 6, 1829 as their first appointee. In 1829 he sailed to China with David Abeel aboard the Olyphant & Co. owned ship Roman. They arrived in Canton on February 19, 1830, where they were welcomed by Morrison. Bridgman and Abeel studied Chinese and Elijah soon began the literary labors to which he devoted much of his life. In 1832 Bridgman started a mission press and began publication of The Chinese Repository, which he edited until 1847.

Bridgman preached in a church among the Factories on Whampoa (Huangpu), near Canton, his "simple, pious and judicious character" impressing William John, 9th Lord Napier of Merchiston, the First Chief Superintendent of the British Trade there, and, in September 1834, upon the latter's return to Macau, he particularly called upon Bridgman to attend upon him every evening in his last days before succumbing to typhoid.

In the same year, Bridgman became the first joint secretary of the Society for the Diffusion of Useful Knowledge; he was a founder of the Morrison Education Society and its president for many years, and active in organizing the Medical Missionary Society of China (1838). From 1839 to 1841 he worked at Macau, preparing a Chinese chrestomathy to aid in language learning. During negotiations to secure American access to China, Bridgman assisted as translator and adviser from 1842 to 1844.

In 1840, Bridgman was part of a group of four people including Walter Henry Medhurst, Charles Gutzlaff, and John Robert Morrison who cooperated to translate the Bible into Chinese. The translation of the Hebrew part was done mostly by Gutzlaff from the Netherlands Missionary Society, with the exception that the Pentateuch and the book of Joshua were done by the group collectively. This translation, completed in 1847 is very famous due to its adoption by the revolutionary peasant leader Hong Xiuquan of the Taipingtianguo movement (Taiping Rebellion) as some of the reputed early doctrines of the organization.

From 1845 to 1852 he continued to work as a translator. On June 28, 1845, Bridgman married Eliza Jane Gillett, an American Episcopalian missionary. They worked together at Guangzhou and adopted two little Chinese girls. Eliza later, in 1850, founded and managed for 15 years the first girls' school in Shanghai. Elijah Coleman Bridgeman died on November 2, 1861, in Shanghai after 32 years of missionary work. After her husband's death Eliza moved to Peking, secured substantial property and started Bridgman Academy, noted for educating a large number of Chinese women leaders.

Shortly after baptizing his first convert Bridgman moved to Shanghai in 1847, where he was primarily occupied in working on Bible translation, his version appearing shortly after his death. Bridgman published a translation of the Hebrew Bible, characterized by the accuracy of the translation and its loyalty to the original Hebrew texts.

In 1857 he founded the Shanghai Literary and Scientific Society (later the North China branch of the Royal Asiatic Society); he became its president and edited its journal.

Bridgman and his wife were both buried in Shanghai, in Shantung Road Cemetery, which was later then destroyed, in 1951 to the Ji'an Cemetery located in the Qingpu District of rural Shanghai. The original downtown location (Shantung Road between Hankow and Kiukiang Roads) later became the Shantung Road Sports Hall / Huangpu Citizen Fitness Center

== Works ==
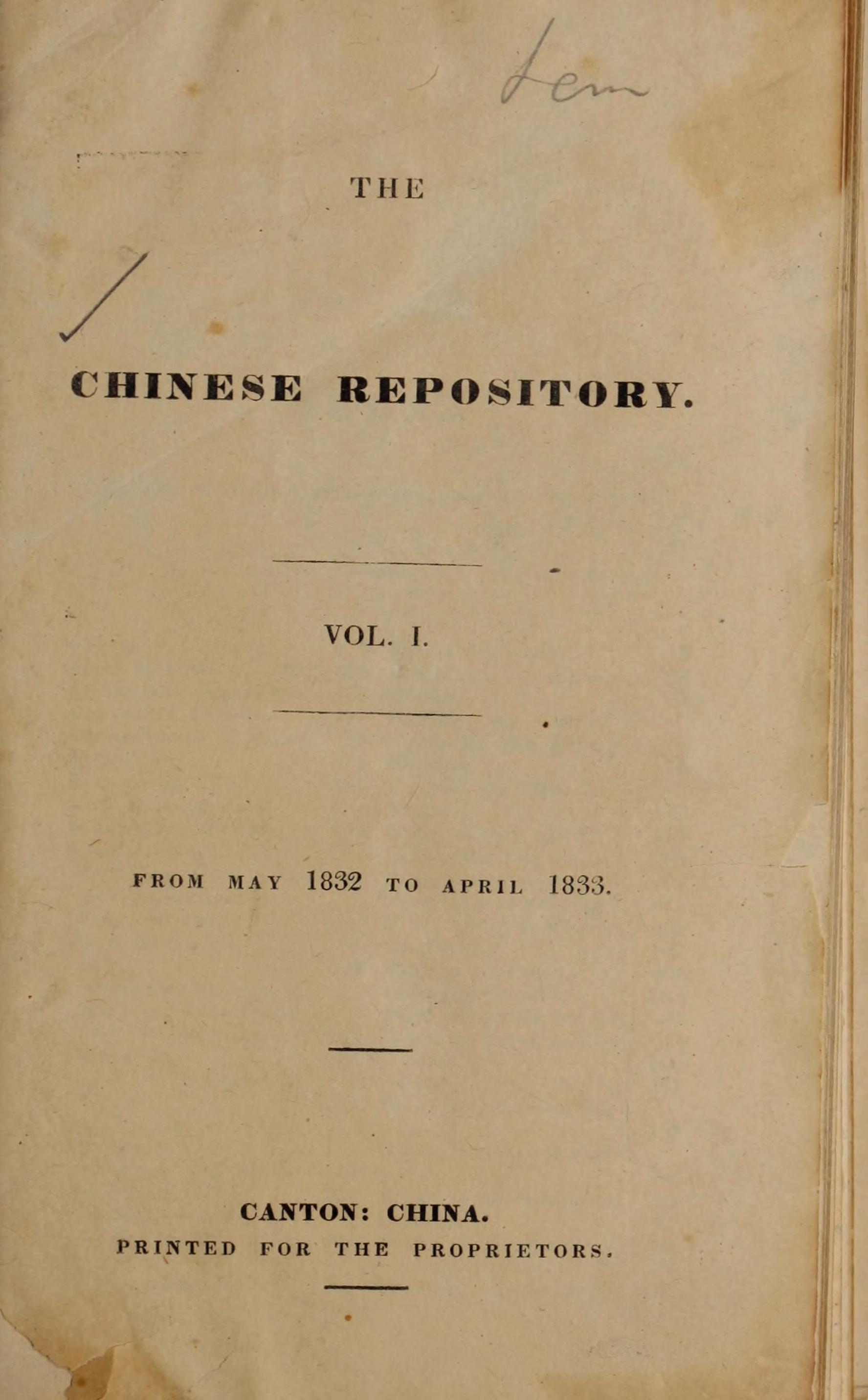
After 1832 Bridgman's magazine provided English readers with in-depth coverage of China.

  - See online editions
- Elijah Coleman Bridgman; Samuel Wells Williams (1842). The Chinese repository, Volume 11. Printed for the proprietors.
- Elijah Coleman Bridgman (1841). A Chinese chrestomathy in the Canton dialect. S.W. Williams. pp. 693.
- Elijah Coleman Bridgman, ed. Eliza Jane Gillett Bridgman (1864). The Pioneer of American Missions in China: the Life and Labors of Elijah Coleman Bridgman.
- Journal of the North-China Branch of the Royal Asiatic Society, Volume I, 1864

== Bibliography ==
- Drake, Frederick W. "Bridgman in China in the early 19th-century," American Neptune 46.1 (1986): 34–42.
- Drake, Fred W (1985), "Protestant Geography in China: EC Bridgman's Portrayal of the West", in Barnett, Suzanne W.; John King Fairbank (eds.), Christianity in China: Early Protestant Missionary Writings, Cambridge, MA: Harvard Univ Council on East Asian, pp. 89–106
- Eliza Jane Bridgman, The Pioneer of American Missions to China: the life and labors of Elijah Coleman Bridgman (New York: A. D. F. Randolph, 1864); online edition
- Missionary Herald; 58 (1862): 75-78 and 68 (1872): 110–112, provides informative obituaries of Elijah and Eliza Bridgman, respectively
- Eliza's Daughters of China, or Sketches of Domestic Life in the Celestial Empire (1853) has an introduction by Elijah.
- Bridgman, Elijah; Letters to Children from China; 1834
- Lazich, Michael C.; E. C. Bridgman (1801-1861), America’s First Missionary to China
- Newcomb, Harvey (1860). A Cyclopedia of Missions: Containing a Comprehensive View of Missionary Operations Throughout the World: with Geographical Descriptions, and Accounts of the Social, Moral, and Religious Condition of the People. Charles Scribner.
