= Hunan People's Publishing House =

Chinese publishing house

- Type: National first-class press
- Industry: Publishing
- Founded: January, 1951
- Headquarters: No. 3, Yingpan East Road, Kaifu District, Changsha City, Hunan Province
- Website: http://www.hnppp.com/

The Hunan People’s Publishing House, or Hunan People's Press (Chinese: 湖南人民出版社; pinyin: Húnán Rénmín Chūbǎnshè) is a National first-class publisher in China. It was founded in January 1951, and has developed into a leading publisher with extensive categories of books on philosophy and social sciences. Hunan People’s Publishing House is well known for reflecting the rich cultural heritage of Hunan Province.

== History ==
On January 10, 1951, Hunan Popular Reading Publishing House (湖南通俗读物出版社) was founded in Changsha, capital of Hunan Province.

In June 1954, Hunan Popular Reading Publishing House was renamed "Hunan People's Publishing House".

From May 1979 to October 1985, Hunan People's Publishing House spined off six new publishing houses: Hunan Science and Technology Publishing House, Hunan Fine Arts Publishing House, Hunan Children's Publishing House, Hunan Education Publishing House, Yuelu Publishing House and Hunan Literature and Art Publishing House.

On December 25, 2008, Hunan People's Publishing House joined the listed company China South Publishing & Media Group Co. Ltd., and was renamed "Hunan People's Publishing House Co. Ltd."

On August 11, 2009, Hunan People's Publishing House was rated as a national first-class publishing house (one of the top 100 book publishing units in the country) by the State Administration of Press, Publication, Radio, Film and Television.

== Publications ==
Hunan People's Publishing House has an extensive catalog of books on history, culture, literature, and education; and is well known for the products reflecting the rich cultural heritage of Hunan. Since its establishment, the company has published more than 10,000 book types. The copyrights of nearly 100 types have been successfully exported to foreign countries and regions including the United States, the United Kingdom, Canada, Vietnam, and Thailand, etc. The ISBN code of Hunan People's Publishing House is 978-7-217.

== Honours ==
More than 1,000 books have won national or provincial and ministerial-level outstanding book awards and best-selling awards, including the "China Publishing Government Award", the "China Outstanding Publications Award" and the "Five One Project" Award.

Hunan People's Publishing House has been successively rated as an advanced collective in the national press and publishing system, a national first-class publishing house, and one of the top 100 book publishing units in the country.
