= Illustrated Treatise on the Maritime Kingdoms =

1843 gazetteer by Wei Yuan and others

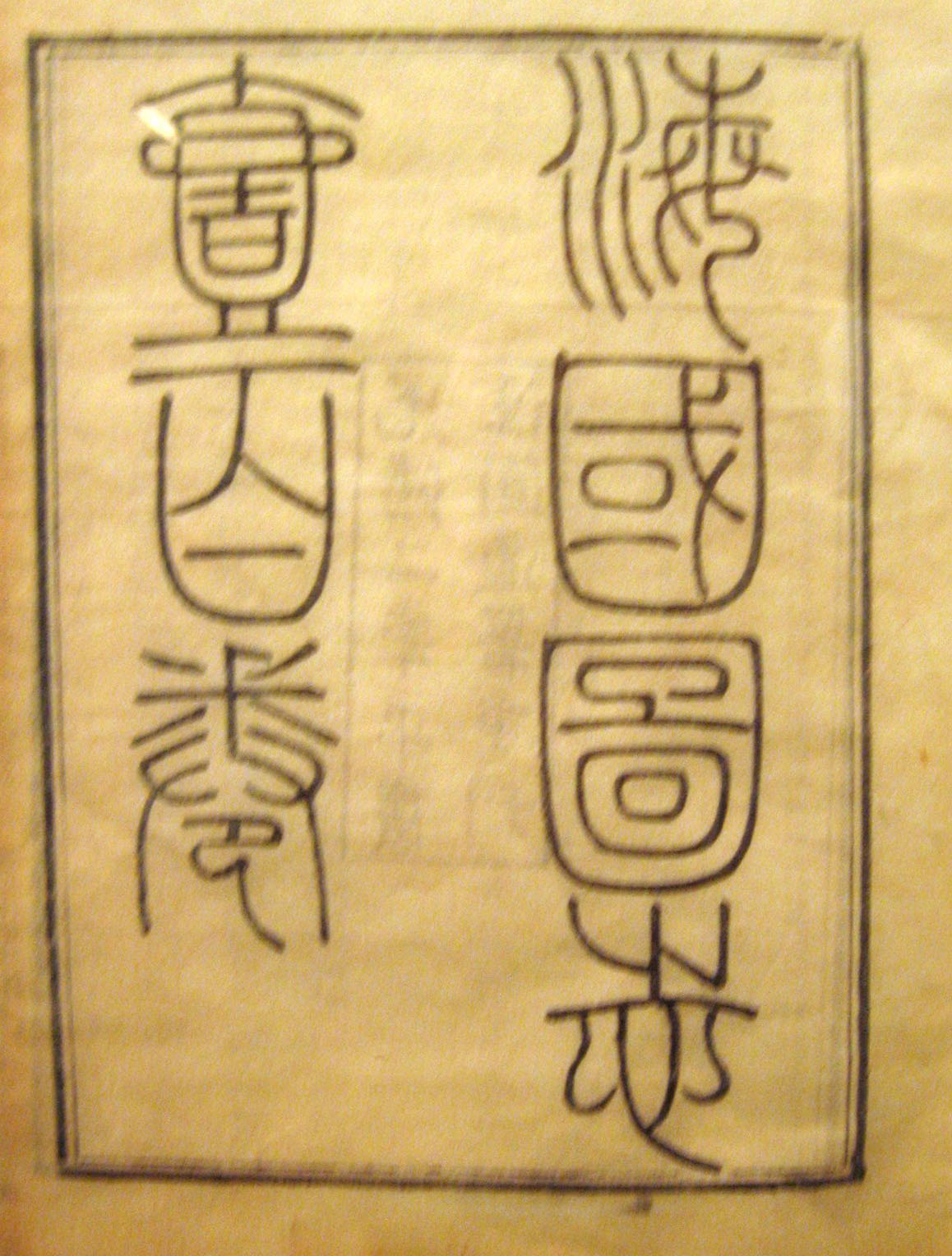
- Title page written using seal script
- Author: Wei Yuan and others
- Original title: 海國圖志; Hǎiguó Túzhì
- Published: 1843
- Publication place: China

The Illustrated Treatise on the Maritime Kingdoms, or Haiguo Tuzhi, is a 19th-century Chinese gazetteer compiled by scholar-official Wei Yuan and others, based on initial translations ordered by Imperial Commissioner Lin Zexu and testimonies provided by Imperial Commissioner Qishan. The Treatise is regarded as the first significant Chinese work on the West and one of China's initial responses to the Anglo-Chinese First Opium War (1839–1842). Eventually stretching to one hundred juan, or scrolls, the treatise contains numerous maps and much geographical detail covering both the western and eastern hemispheres. The main principles advocated in the Treatise were later absorbed by the Self-Strengthening Movement, and the book also garnered significant interest in Japan and helped mould the country's foreign policy with respect to the West.

== Background ==
During their terms in Guangzhou and Tianjin as Imperial Commissioner, Lin Zexu and Qishan observed the might of British naval power and the inadequacies of the Chinese coastal defence system at first hand. Along with other intellectuals of the time, their objective was "to determine the source and nature of Western power in Asia and to discover Western objectives in East Asia." For Lin, he hired four Chinese translators who had been trained by missionaries to assist with the task of obtaining and translating appropriate western texts. One of them, Liang Jinde (梁進得), an assistant to missionary Elijah Coleman Bridgman, provided copies of The Chinese Repository and other works. Lin also purchased a copy of the 1834 Encyclopedia of Geography by Hugh Murray from the American Board of Commissioners for Foreign Missions, which Liang translated to become the draft for Lin's own Geography of the Four Continents (四洲志). However, before the book could be published, the First Opium War broke out in 1839 and the project was shelved. When the war ended in 1842, Lin's exile to the remote northwestern city of Yili meant that he passed his draft manuscript to Wei Yuan with a request that he complete it. Lin's contributions to the treatise proved so important that Karl Gützlaff mistakenly attributed the work to him in his September 1847 review for the Chinese Repository. As for Qishan, although he did not translate any works and was nowhere near as philosophical as Lin, he was among the most pragmatic officials who had fought in the war, and his first-hand exposure to the British made him realise something needed to change.

== Content ==
As well as mapping various countries, Wei's objective was to provide as complete a picture as possible of the advantages they possessed in shipbuilding techniques and weapons production so that these "might be turned to use for subduing them." Wei completed his investigations of western penetration into East Asia in 1841, and in the Treatise proposed the construction of a shipyard and arsenal at Canton and the employment of foreign engineers to teach marine navigation and weapons operation –"pioneer ideas in the military history of modern China".

== Structure and editions ==
[It] divides the whole into eighteen parts, which are set forth in classical and somewhat obscure language. The 1st section enjoins the necessity of taking advantage of barbarian power and inventions, to resist the barbarians and to be on a proper footing with them. This may be said to be the grand object of the book, which then proceeds to give a geographical and historical account of all the nations in Europe, Asia, Africa and America. The closing chapters direct attention to the superiority of barbarians in their method of circulating news, ship-building, and gunnery; and are filled with woodcuts representing things and processes &c. Amongst barbarians, the English occupy a prominent place.

— The Chinese Repository Volume XIX January–December, 1850; p. 135

The first edition of the Illustrated Treatise on the Maritime Kingdoms, comprising 50 juan or scrolls, was published on January 3 1843. This was followed in 1847 with a reorganised and slightly longer version running to 60 juan, while the third and final edition of 100 juan appeared in 1852. As the editions progressed, each in turn featured new maps and geographical information regarding the West, using material that became available after the First Opium War.

== Influence ==
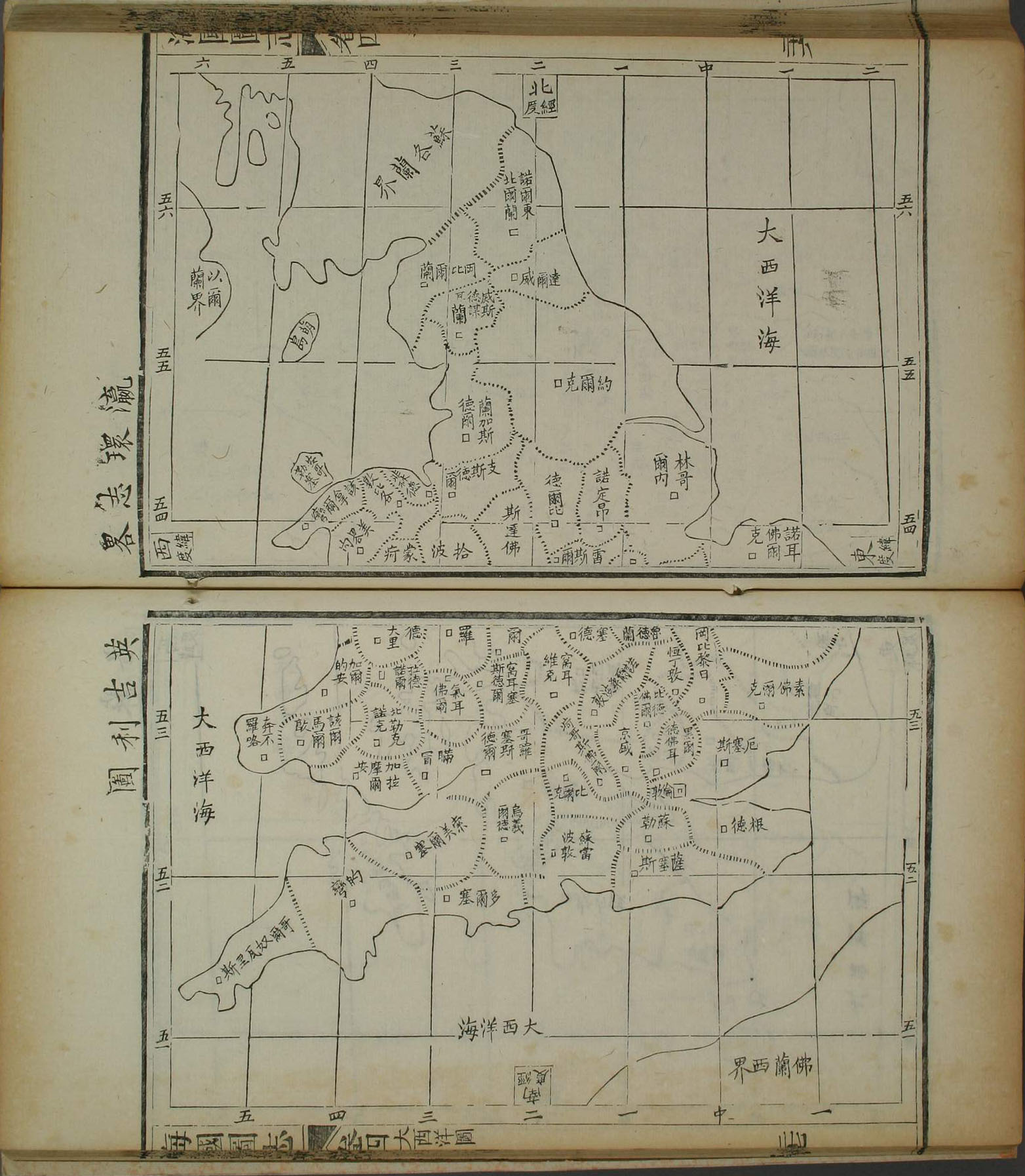
Map of Great Britain from the Hǎiguótúzhì

Although on publication the Treatise received scant attention in China in the initial years, in the longer term, Wei and his contemporaries helped change the Chinese view of the outside world not only through the dissemination of new material but also by starting to change the view that China was the "center of civilization" or "center of the world" ("Middle Kingdom"). Notably, some core principles advocated in the Treatise became the main theories of the Self-Strengthening Movement that started in the 1860s. The relationship between Wei Yuan and the Self-Strengthening Movement made China begin to move towards modernization and had a far-reaching influence.

Wei's work was also to have a later impact on Japanese foreign policy. In 1862, samurai Takasugi Shinsaku, from the ruling Japanese Tokugawa shogunate, visited Shanghai on board the trade ship Senzaimaru. Japan had been forced open by US Commodore Matthew C. Perry less than a decade earlier and the purpose of the mission was to establish how China had fared following the country's defeat in the Second Opium War (1856–1860). Takasugi was aware of the forward thinking exhibited by those such as Wei on the new threats posed by Western "barbarians" and later recorded in his diary: "The philosophy of the Chinese people stands poles apart from the correct path for China's future development. They are infatuated with lofty words unrelated to reality." Sinologist Joshua Fogel concludes that when Takasugi found out "that the writings of Wei Yuan were out of print in China and that the Chinese were not forcefully preparing to drive the foreigners out of their country, rather than derive from this a long analysis of the failures of the Chinese people, he extracted lessons for the future of Japan". Similarly, after reading the Treatise, scholar and political reformer Yokoi Shōnan became convinced that Japan should embark on a "cautious, gradual and realistic opening of its borders to the Western world" and thereby avoid the mistake China had made in engaging in the First Opium War. Takasugi would later emerge as a leader of the 1868 Meiji Restoration which presaged the emergence of Japan as a modernised nation at the beginning of the 20th century. Yoshida Shōin, influential Japanese intellectual and Meiji reformer, said Wei's Treatise had "made a big impact in our country".

== Notes ==
1. In September 1847, the Chinese Repository observed: "We have never heard of this work in the bookshops of Canton and have only seen an advanced review copy. ... It should be distributed amongst officials in Beijing and all the provinces to aid their understanding when dealing with foreigners."
