= Tao Zhu (Qing dynasty) =

Chinese scholar-official and reformer (1779–1839)

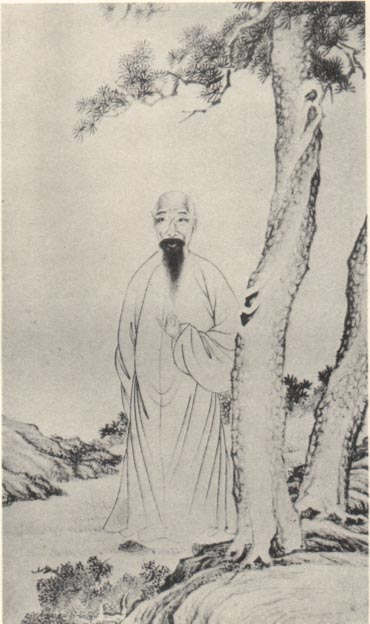

Viceroy of Liangjiang
- In office 24 July 1830 – 22 April 1839
- Preceded by: Jiang Youxian
- Succeeded by: Lin Zexu

Personal details
- Born: 17 January 1779
- Died: 12 July 1839 (aged 60)

Tao Zhu or Tao Shu (Chinese: 陶澍; pinyin: Táo Zhù / Táo Shù; Wade–Giles: T'ao Shu / T'ao Chu; 17 January 1779 – 12 July 1839) was a Chinese scholar-official of the Qing dynasty who played a key role a broad movement toward institutional reform in the early 19th century. He is especially known for his role as Governor-General in making changes in the salt monopoly of the Qing dynasty.

== Career ==
Tao was trained first by his father, a scholar and teacher, and then in the Yuelu Academy, in the city of Changsha in the conservative inland province of Hunan. The Academy inculcated an ascetic philosophy of self-examination and dedication to rescuing the world from the decadence of recent times. Graduates formed what one historian called a "network of messianic alumni." Tao received his jinshi degree in 1802, and joined the Hanlin Academy in 1805. After posts in Sichuan, Shanxi, and Anhui, he was appointed governor of Anhui and then Jiangsu. When the Grand Canal was blocked by floods, in 1826, as governor of Jiangsu, he took the dangerous course of shipping tribute grain by sea, using some 1,562 junks on the route from Shanghai to Tianjin. The strategy was successful but roused the opposition of officials who profited from the use of the Canal.

In the 1820s, reform officials under the Daoguang Emperor proposed restructuring and renewed oversight of the bureaucracy. The Qing government inherited a Salt Administration divided geographically into districts, the largest and most central of which was Liang-Huai, on the north coast of Jiangsu, with its headquarters in Yangzhou, which shipped salt to seven provinces: Jiangsu, Anhui, Henan, Jiangxi, Hunan, Hubei, and Guizhou. The rights to salt produced along the coast was controlled by some 200 private merchants who held hereditary franchises for distribution in specific inland areas. These merchants combined official status and private function, but by the early 19th century failed to deliver the massive amounts of salt they had contracted but instead raised prices. Smuggled and black market sales then outweighed official sales, and government revenues fell.

In 1832, Tao was tasked by the Daoguang Emperor with fixing the problem, which was deemed especially acute in light of the outflow of silver in the years leading up to the First Opium War. Acting on the advice of his classmates Wei Yuan and Bao Shichen, two other officials in the reform group, Tao took immediate action to end the Ming franchise system in favor of a relatively open market. Any merchant of good standing could buy salt distribution tickets for the purchase of single shipments of large or small amounts which could be retailed anyplace the merchant wished. The tickets themselves could be bought and sold. Tao's reforms opened the system up to small scale traders, depriving the hereditary merchants and the smugglers of their profits and lowering costs to the consumer. However, Tao could not meet the optimistic commitments he had made to the emperor.

Tao resigned in March 1839, giving illness as the reason, and died four months later. A temple was erected in his memory in Banpu (now Guanyun), Jiangsu, a city in the salt region.
