= David Abeel =

American physician

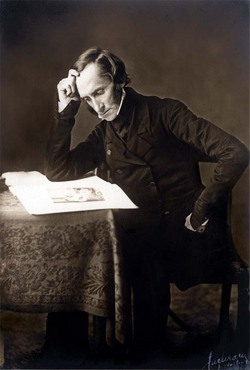
- Missionary to China
- Born: 12 June 1804; New Brunswick, New Jersey, United States
- Died: 4 September 1846 (aged 42); Albany, New York, United States
- Education: New Brunswick Theological Seminary, University of New Brunswick
- Title: Evangelist, Reverend

David Abeel (June 12, 1804 – September 4, 1846) was a missionary of the Dutch Reformed Church with the American Reformed Mission.

== Biography ==
Abeel was born in New Brunswick, New Jersey on June 12, 1804 to Captain David and Jane Hassert Abeel. He is a descendant of Albany, New York Mayor Johannes Abeel.

After having begun his studies in medicine, Abeel converted and was ordained a minister. He graduated from New Brunswick Theological Seminary in 1827, and was ordained to the ministry that same year. He served as a pastor of his church until the winter 1828, when he went to St. John's, Antigua and Barbuda to recover his health. He was appointed the chaplain of the Seaman's Friend Society. In 1829, he left New York to serve as a missionary. He arrived in Canton, China in 1829, later evangelizing in Java, Malacca, Siam, and Singapore. In 1833, he relocated to Europe, where he visited England, Switzerland, France, Germany, and the Netherlands through 1834. While he was in England, he co-founded a group to promote the education of Asian women.

In 1835, he returned to the United States to recruit additional missionaries from his church to work overseas. He remained in that capacity through 1838, to return to active missionary duty. In 1839, he visited Maritime Southeast Asia, and later established a mission in Xiamen in 1842. In Xiamen, Abeel met with Chinese official and scholar Xu Jiyu, who helped obtain information on conditions in the West. In 1844 he was joined by new co-workers Pohlman and Elihu Doty. Xu later used this information to compile an influential work on geography.

In 1845 he returned to the United States and died in Albany, New York, on September 4, 1846.

== Works ==
His published works include:

- Journal of Residence in China (1829-1833)
- To the Bachelors of China, by a Bachelor (1833)
- A Narrative of Residence in China (1834)
- The Claims of the World to the Gospel (1838)
- The Missionary Convention at Jerusalem (1838)
- Memoirs of the Rev. D. Abeel

== See also ==
- History of Christian missions
