= Wei Yuan =

Chinese philosopher and major reformist thinker

- 魏源
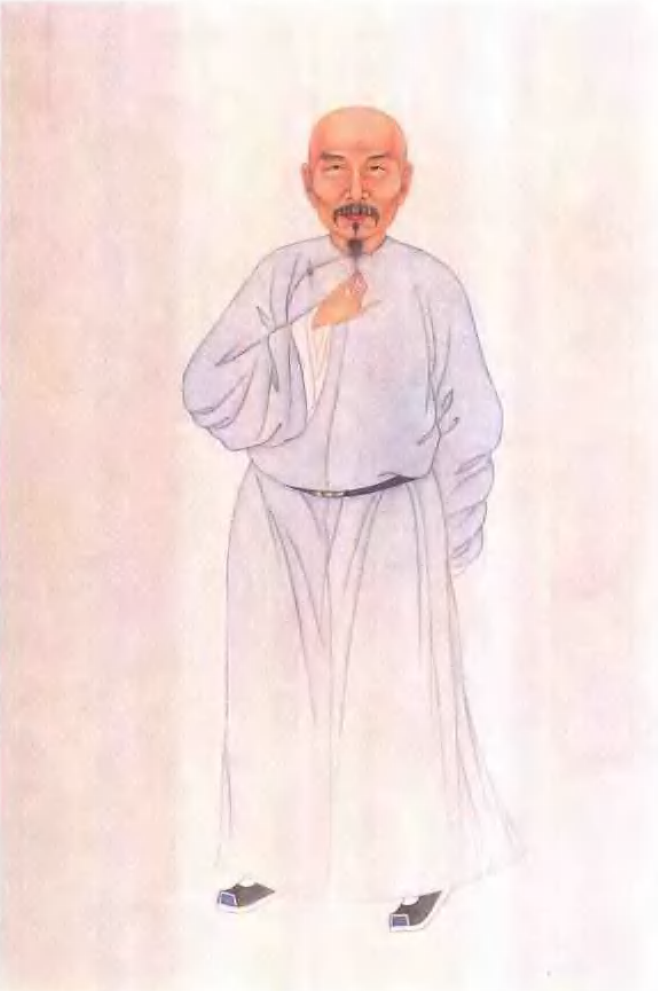
- Wei Yuan, 19th-century portrait

Secretariat of He Changling
- In office 1822 – 27 January 1825; Supervised by He Changling
- Monarch: Daoguang Emperor

Viceroy of Liangjiang
- In office 28 January 1825 – 7 July 1825
- Monarch: Daoguang Emperor
- Preceded by: Sun Yuting
- Succeeded by: Qishan

Secretariat of Tao Zhu
- In office 8 July 1825 – 14 October 1835; Supervised by Tao Zhu
- Monarch: Daoguang Emperor

Secretariat of Deng Tingzhen
- In office 15 October 1835 – 21 January 1840; Supervised by Deng Tingzhen
- Monarch: Daoguang Emperor

Acting Magistrate of Dongtai county
- In office 1845 – 1846; Left office due to mother's death
- Monarch: Daoguang Emperor

Magistrate of Xinghua county
- In office 1849–1851
- Monarchs: Daoguang Emperor; Xianfeng Emperor

Magistrate of Gaoyou
- In office 1851–1854
- Monarch: Xianfeng Emperor

Personal details
- Born: 23 April 1794 Shaoyang, Hunan, Qing Dynasty
- Died: 26 March 1857 (aged 62) Hangzhou, Qing Dynasty
- Relations: Chen Weiduo (son); Chen Weiyi (son); Chen Weilin (son); Chen Wei'ao (son)
- Children: 10, including four sons and six daughters
- Events: First Opium War; Self-Strengthening Movement; Tongzhi Restoration

Wei Yuan (Chinese: 魏源; pinyin: Wèi Yuán; April 23, 1794 – March 26, 1857), born Wei Yuanda (魏遠達), courtesy names Moshen (默深) and Hanshi (漢士), art name Liangtu (良圖), was a Chinese scholar-official, historian, geographer, and a major reformist thinker of the late Qing Dynasty of China. Born in Shaoyang, Hunan, he lived during the reigns of the Qianlong, Jiaqing, Daoguang, and Xianfeng emperors, and he is widely known as one of the first Qing scholar-officials to advocate for the reformation of the Qing military and government, and for the adaptation of western policies following the Qing's defeat in the First Opium War. Wei viewed the war as a signal that the Qing was significantly underdeveloped in comparison to western powers, prompting his advocacy for innovation and learning from the west to allow the Qing to catch up to the west technologically and militarily.

Wei was born in 1794 in Shaoyang, Hunan. Having passed the provincial imperial examination in 1822 and officially becoming a Qing statesman in 1825, this meant Wei first became a Qing official before he began his philosophical work in 1826. Notwithstanding this however, Wei actually compiled most of his work regarding such advocacies regarding western learning after moving to Yangzhou, Jiangsu in 1831, where he remained for the rest of his life. Posterior to the First Opium War, Wei worked closely with political philosopher Lin Zexu and Mongol nobleman Qishan, both of which had first-hand experience in the war. Wei was deeply concerned with the crisis facing China in the early 19th century, and while he remained loyal to the Qing dynasty, he also sketched a number of proposals for the improvement of the administration of the empire.

His philosophical works served as an integral part of the foundation of the self-strengthening movement, a major reformist movement in the late 1800s to incorporate western technology into the Qing Dynasty, which occurred promptly after his death in 1857. . His enduring legacy is anchored in his role as a pioneering pioneer of modern Chinese reform, advocating for the Qing to "open its eyes to the world" to understand and counter Western imperialism.

== Early life ==
Wei Yuanda was born in Shaoyang, Hunan province, Qing Dynasty on 23 April 1794 to Wei Shu and an unnamed mother. He demonstrated exceptional scholarly promise and intellectual ability from a young age, passing the district-level imperial examination at age 14 in 1808 and being admitted to the prestigious Yuelu Academy soon after.

During his time at the academy, Wei espoused the Old Text School of Confucianism, which emphasized the relevance of classical teachings to contemporary governance, and became a vocal member of the statecraft school, which advocated practical learning in opposition to the allegedly barren evidentiary scholarship as represented by scholars like Dai Zhen. Under the guidance of Liu Fenglu (刘逢禄), one of the provincial-level examiners for the Hunan imperial examination, Wei developed a belief that learning the classics of Confucianism were crucial in contributing to reform, an idea that defined his later legacy.

== Bureaucratic career ==
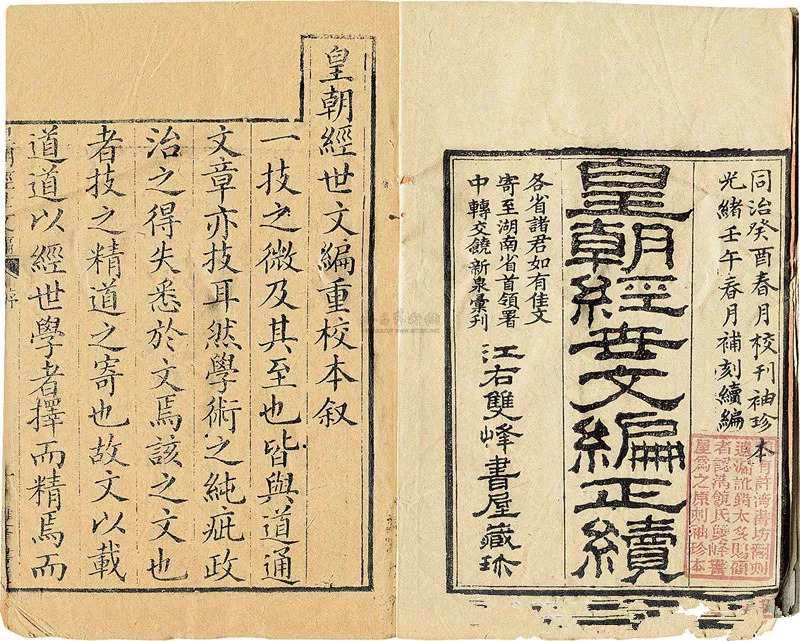
The cover of Collection of essays on statecraft, compiled by Wei and He Changling

Wei was officially admitted into the Qing bureaucracy in 1822 following his passing of the provincial-level imperial examination and obtaining of the Juren degree. However, he failed to pass the metropolitan examination, much to Liu Fenglu's dismay. Unable to pass the metropolitan exam and therefore unable to secure an official government post, Wei entered the private secretariats of higher-ranking Qing officials, which he began by serving as a strategist for Qing statesman He Changling from 1822 to 1825. Wei notably became a statesman himself in early 1825 after he was invited by He to compile his landmark 120-volume Huangchao Jingshi Wenbian, which was about collected writings on statecraft and later became a foundational text for reform-minded officials.

Subsequently, Wei was assigned his first formal government post as Viceroy of Liangjiang on 28 January 1825. This appointment meant he was the official viceroy of Jiangsu, Jiangxi, and Anhui provinces respectively, which was the wealthiest and most strategically important region in the Qing Dynasty at the time, with the region contributing around one-third of the Qing's entire tax revenue. Wei's routines in this new role encompassed controlling the Grand Canal and the Jiangnan Region. However, it also involved control of the Lower Yangtze River. The Yangtze River and the Huai River notably required constant supervision and maintenance to prevent flooding that could impact the wealthy region of Liangjiang and Beijing. Additionally, Liangjiang was home to the Liang-Huai Salt Zone, an extremely corrupt state of the Qing Dynasty, led by smuggling syndicates and home to the empire's highest concentration of scholar-officials, examination degree holders, and powerful landed gentry.

When the Daoguang Emperor was notified of Wei's appointment at such a high position despite only being a provincial level graduate, he was immediately dismissed from office after only 7 months in office, despite the fact that he had done an adequate job. Wei was consequently reassigned to become the secretariat of Qing statesman Tao Zhu where he, among other things, advocated sea transport of grain to the capital instead of using the Grand Canal and he also advocated a strengthening of the Qing's frontier defense. In order to alleviate the demographic crisis in China, Wei also spoke in favor of large scale emigration of Han Chinese into Xinjiang.

In 1829, Wei, after once again failing the metropolitan exam, purchased a position in the Grand Secretariat.

In 1845, Wei finally passed the metropolitan exam, being placed 93rd in the class of graduates and earning a jinshi degree. However, his career in the civil service posterior to acquiring the degree was brief, only lasting approximately a decade before his eventual retirement in 1854. Wei Yuan was appointed for the first time as the acting magistrate of Dongtai county in Jiangsu province. However, he did not spend much time in this post since he had to resign because of the death of his mother. After completing the traditional three-year mourning period, Wei returned to office in 1849, serving as the magistrate of Xinghua county in Jiangsu. It was his most famous posting at the local level, as later in the same year, floods posed a major threat to the region. Defying the orders of his superiors, Wei took a daring step, opting not to open the water gates to irrigate the fields in the region despite this putting the city at risk of flooding. The crops in the region survived the disaster. As a reward for his bravery, the rice harvested that year was nicknamed “Esquire Wei’s Rice.” In 1851, Wei Yuan was promoted to the a senior position in department magistrate of Gaoyou, Jiangsu province. This was his final official post.

His tenure, however, coincided with the rapid escalation of the Taiping Rebellion, which brought chaos to Jiangsu. In 1853, he fell out of favor with higher officials and was accused of "obstructing the postal service" and "neglecting military affairs", which were charges that many modern historical scholars view as politically motivated scapegoating. Though he was soon reinstated, the incident contributed to his retirement in 1854, where he cited declining health and the rise of the Taiping rebels as the motive.

== Philosophical career ==
=== Initial Works ===
Wei kickstarted his philosophical career with his first major work in 1826. Under Tao Zhu, Wei developed his work with He Changling by writing and publishing his own version of the Huangchao Jingshi Wenbian, which was a massive anthology, and a compilation of over 2,000 official documents, memorials, and essays written by Qing officials and scholars from the early Qing dynasty up to the 1820s. The anthology covered topics of education, finance, water conservancy, and military affairs and organised them neatly to allow for comprehensiveness. Wei's objective with this anthology was to create a manual for effective governance, making the practical policy ideas of past statesmen readily accessible to current officials. His work on this anthology is what first gained him a national reputation as a reform-minded scholar.

Additionally, in the anthology, Wei built on his advocacies of sea transport of grain to the capital instead of using the Grand Canal, by emphasising an increased usage in the Yangtze Delta. His most famous proposal from this period was to transport the tribute grain around the Shandong peninsula, rather than using the inefficient and costly Grand Canal.

The anthology was built on Wei's philosophical foundation as a reformist thinker deeply rooted in the New Text School of Confucianism. Contrary to his earlier philosophical beliefs in the Old Text School of Confucianism, Qing statesmen Zhuang Cunyu and Wei's teacher Liu Fenglu had revived the concept of the New Text School, which Wei found himself deeply aligned with. The New Text School rejected the rigid, metaphysical interpretations of the orthodox Cheng-Zhu school of Neo-Confucianism, which Wei, Liu, and Zhuang felt had become outdated. The metaphysical interpretation themselves stated that confucian philosophers Cheng Yi, Cheng Hao, and Zhu Xi believed that the Dao (Chinese: 道; pinyin: dào; lit. 'way') of Tian (Chinese: 天; pinyin: tiān; lit. 'heaven') is expressed in principle or Li (Chinese: 理; pinyin: lǐ), but that it is sheathed in matter or qi (Chinese: 氣; pinyin: qì). In this, his system is based on Buddhist systems of the time that divided things into principle (again, li), and shi (Chinese: 事; pinyin: shì).

Unlike most interpretations of Confucianism that predominantly viewed it as a traditional custom, Wei, Liu, and Zhuang believed that the original spirit of Confucius was one of active reform and that the Confucian Classics were not just ancient history but contained practical lessons for addressing contemporary problems. This provided the ideological justification for Wei's entire career of seeking practical change.

=== First Opium War ===
After moving to Yangzhou in Jiangsu province in 1831, the First Opium War from 1839 to 1842 was the most transformative event of Wei's philosophical career. Having spent the 1820s and 1830s advocating for reformation and innovation, Wei viewed the First Opium War as the turning point that proved Wei's point that change and reform was needed for the Qing, with his philosophical work having been heavily tied with the war beginning from 1840.

Having been a part of Governor-general of Liangguang Deng Tingzhen's secretariat since the late 1830s, Wei was on an expedition in Guangdong from Jiangsu when the war broke out. Wei made the best of the situation and optimised his position on the warfront. He began by participating in Yuqian's military staff from 1840 to 1841, which allowed him to compile a new book named "A Brief History of England" based on confessions from British prisoners of war captured by admiral Guan Tianpei. This would be the first of two works that Wei would compose on the British, which was extremely new material as he had never interacted with the British prior to this moment. Having gathered intel from the British regarding their cultures and specific elements to incorporate into the Qing for potential reforms, Wei next aimed to gather intel regarding the cultural and technological differences between Qing and British naval power. To do this, Wei corresponded with Qing Imperial Commissioner and political philosopher Lin Zexu, who had first-hand experience in the war, and two scheduled a meeting in June 1841.

Unanticipatedly, Lin was fired as Imperial Commissioner in October 1840, meaning Wei and Lin had to meet en route to Ili, Xinjiang, where Lin was to be exiled. The two ended up meeting for a short period in Zhenjiang, Jiangsu province, in July 1841. As Lin could not stay for an extended period, the two worked tirelessly for multiple consecutive nights. They used this short period to review Lin's translated intelligence and organize geography texts. Most importantly, during this period, Lin handed over and entrusted Wei with his draft manuscript of the Gazetteer of the Four Continents (四洲志, Sìzhōuzhì), which was the Qing's first official attempt at understanding technology and culture outside of China through research into over 30 foreign nations. This manuscript was itself was based on translations of Western geographical works, primarily Hugh Murray's 1834 Encyclopaedia of Geography. Lin's dying wish, in effect, was for Wei to complete his work of understanding the foreigners. This bequest was the direct catalyst for Wei Yuan's most famous work, famously known as the Illustrated Treatise on the Maritime Kingdoms or the Haiguo Tuzhi. He now had the raw data to begin constructing a new worldview for China. Additionally, Lin also handed over a few hundred guns and a ship which he purchased from the Europeans during the war to Wei.

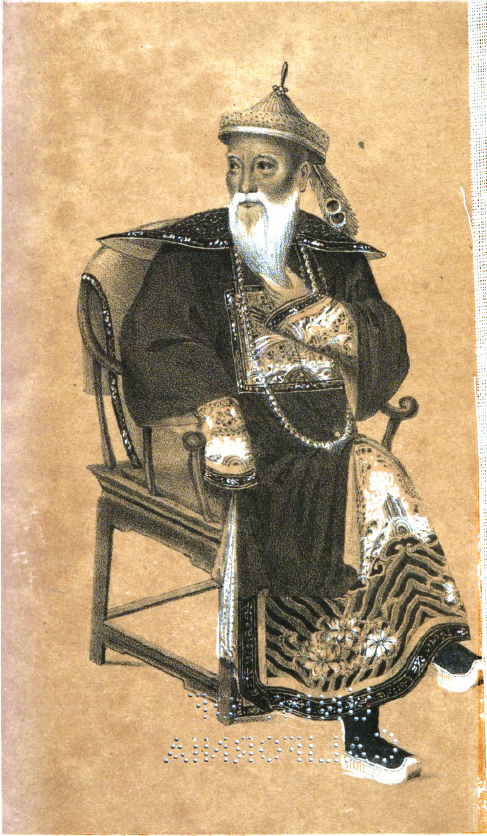
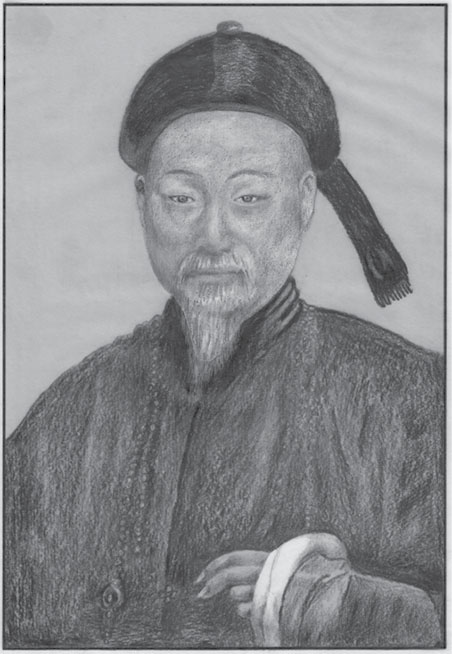
Portraits of Lin Zexu (left) and Qishan (right)

After Lin departed, Wei met with Imperial Commissioner Qishan, who also had first-hand experience in the war, having replaced Lin as Imperial Commissioner after he was fired. Qishan had previously engaged in negotiations with the British in Tianjin a year prior in June 1840 and had even drafted a convention with them in Guangzhou, which allowed him to see true British naval power. Qishan gave testimonies to Wei, which helped alongside Lin's manuscripts in creating the Illustrated Treatise. The reason for Wei's correspondence with Lin and Qishan instead of other individuals was that during their terms in Guangdong and Tianjin as Imperial Commissioner, Lin and Qishan observed the might of British naval power and the inadequacies of the Chinese coastal defence system at first hand. Along with other intellectuals of the time, their objective was "to determine the source and nature of Western power in Asia and to discover Western objectives in East Asia." For Lin, he hired four Chinese translators who had been trained by missionaries to assist with the task of obtaining and translating appropriate western texts. One of them, Liang Jinde (梁進得), an assistant to missionary Elijah Coleman Bridgman, provided copies of The Chinese Repository and other works. Lin possessed a copy of the 1834 Encyclopedia of Geography by Hugh Murray from the American Board of Commissioners for Foreign Missions because he had purchased it, and Liang had translated it to become the draft for Lin's own Geography of the Four Continents (四洲志). However, before the book could be published, the war broke out and the project was shelved. When the war ended in 1842, Lin's exile to the remote northwestern city of Ili meant that he would not be able to complete it, which is why he passed it over to Wei for completion. For Qishan, although he did not translate any works and was nowhere near as philosophical as Lin, he was among the most pragmatic officials who had fought in the war, and his first-hand exposure to the British made him realise something needed to change.

After discussions with Qishan and Lin, and already being increasingly concerned with the threat from the Western powers and maritime defense, Wei's first major post-war publication was A Military History of the Qing Dynasty (聖武記, Shèngwǔ Jì, 1842), which was written and published in 1842. Known at the time as the Shêng Wu-ki, the book was a detailed military history of the Qing dynasty's rise and its major 18th-century conquests. However, Wei was not merely chronicling the past in his writing of the book, as he was writing a diagnostic manual. By comparing the Qing's former military might with its current weakness, Wei actively attempted to diagnose the reasons for its decline. The final chapters contained a narrative of the First Opium War from the Chinese perspective, intended as a lesson in failure. This work was his "loyal remonstrance" to the court, arguing that China could be strong again, with its final two chapters translated by Edward Harper Parker as the Chinese Account of the Opium War. This publication was his first work that formed the foundation of Wei's legacy as a true reformist thinker. Wei also wrote a separate narrative on the First Opium War (《道光洋艘征撫記》, Dàoguāng Yángsōu Zhēngfǔ Jì) in 1841.

=== Illustrated Treatise on the Maritime Kingdoms ===
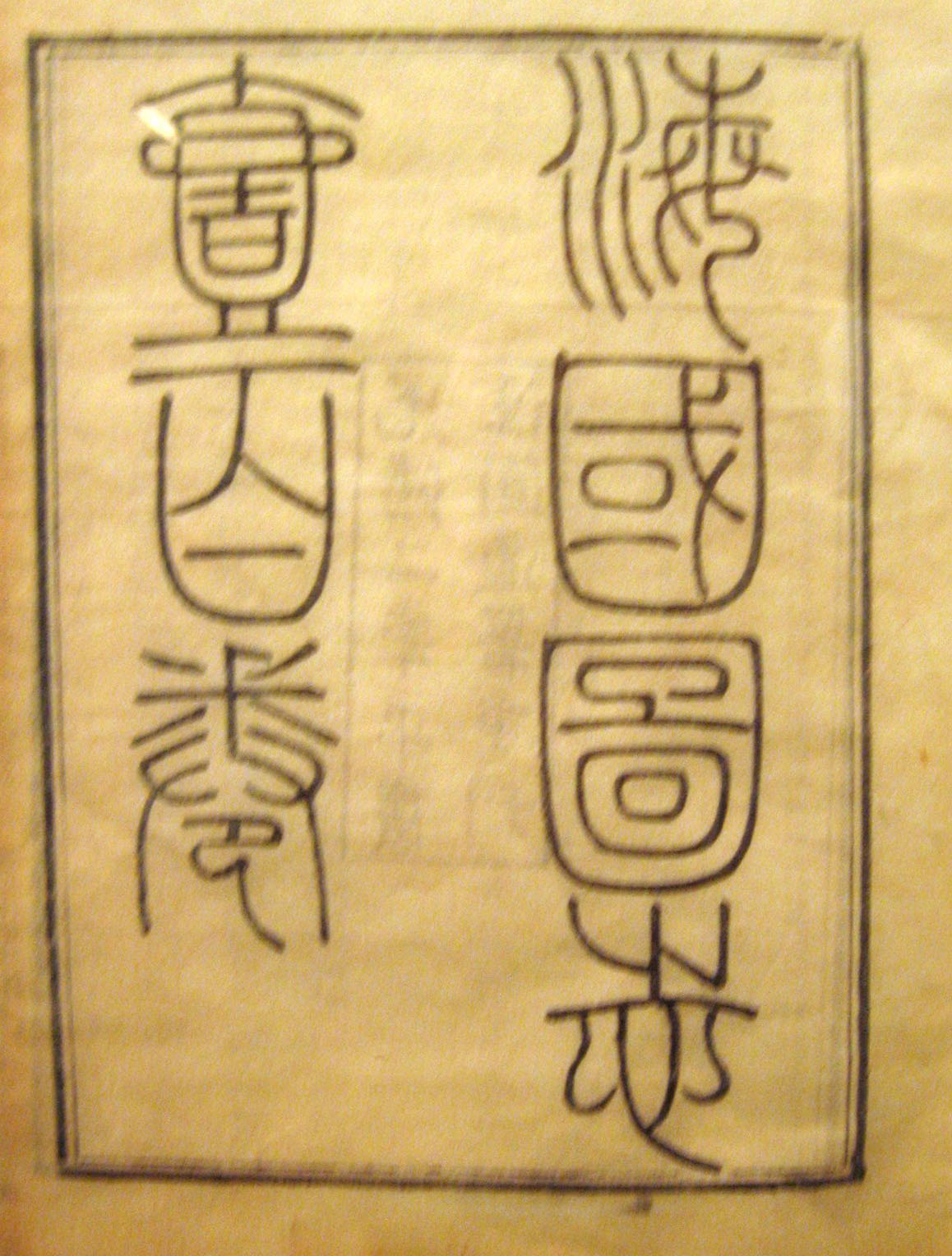
Title page of the Illustrated Treatise on the Maritime Kingdoms written using seal script

In 1843, Wei truly cemented his legacy following his publication of the Illustrated Treatise on the Maritime Kingdoms on 3 January. Using Lin's manuscripts, Qishan's testimonials, among other materials, Wei created the first version of the book that contained up to 50 scrolls, and it was widely considered a world geography, attempting to map the territories, peoples, and politics of countries across the globe. As well as mapping various countries, Wei's objective was to provide as complete of a picture as possible of the advantages the west possessed in shipbuilding techniques and weapons production so that these "might be turned to use for subduing them." In the Treatise, he proposed the construction of a shipyard and arsenal at Guangzhou and the employment of foreign engineers to teach marine navigation and weapons operation –"pioneer ideas in the military history of modern China". The Chinese repository referred to the book as:

[It] divides the whole into eighteen parts, which are set forth in classical and somewhat obscure language. The 1st section enjoins the necessity of taking advantage of barbarian power and inventions, to resist the barbarians and to be on a proper footing with them. This may be said to be the grand object of the book, which then proceeds to give a geographical and historical account of all the nations in Europe, Asia, Africa and America. The closing chapters direct attention to the superiority of barbarians in their method of circulating news, ship-building, and gunnery; and are filled with woodcuts representing things and processes &c. Amongst barbarians, the English occupy a prominent place.

In 1847, Wei created a second, enlarged edition of the book that included additional maps and data that added up to around 60 scrolls. In the book, the East India Company and British India as a whole was suggested as a potential target by Wei. During this time period, Wei also went to Guangzhou and Macau to visit the famous Confucian scholar Chen Li and meet with the Portuguese consulate, and went to British Hong Kong to purchase books from various countries. In 1852, Wei created a final, third edition of the book that contained 100 scrolls, serving as the definitive version of the work, representing the culmination of Wei's effort to collect and synthesize all available Western knowledge. In this edition, the creation of a government organ for translation was proposed by Wei. In the preface to the book, Wei Yuan also laid out his revolutionary new strategy for national defense. He created a new famous slogan in "Learn from the barbarians to control them", which meant the Qing had to learn the technologies of the west in order to gain the military advantage again. Going beyond simple theory however, Wei Yuan used the book to advocate for a concrete modernization program, including the construction of modern arsenals and shipyards to produce western-style steamships and firearms, hiring of foreign engineers to teach the Chinese how to operate and manufacture western technology, and reformation of the military as it needed to be professionalised, with a shift from a large, poorly trained conscript army to a smaller, best trained, and better equipped force. The 1852 version was based on newly published Western works.

== Later Life and Death ==
After retiring in 1854, Wei moved to Hangzhou, Zhejiang. In the last three years of his life, Wei converted and devoted himself to Buddhism, granting himself the buddhist name Chengguan (承贯). Wei died peacefully during meditation on 26 March 1857, aged 62.

=== Burial Controversies ===
Wei was buried on the Nanping Mountains after his death. However, as his burial coincided with the ongoing conflict of the Taiping Rebellion, his family was only able to bury him in a simple, unorganised manner. Lack of maintenance of his poorly built grave meant it began to rot soon after. However, according to scholar Li Bairong, a rumour emerged in the 1850s that Wei's disillusionment with the poor end to his civil service career drove him to join the Taiping Heavenly Kingdom as one of the Three Rural Elders (乡三老). Officials that believed such rumour was suggested to have deliberately "flattened" (pingmu) the grave instead of it naturally deteriorating. However, this claim is widely refuted by modern historical scholars. Wei's deteriorating grave was later restored by Qing reformist and statesman Zuo Zongtang in 1864.

== Legacy ==
=== In China ===
The immediate legacy of Wei's work in the Qing Dynasty was one of profound neglect. Even up until his death, his works, especially the Illustrated Treatise on Maritime Kingdoms, gained scant attention from the Qing Imperial Court and the majority of the scholar-official class, who were rather conservative, with many scholar-officials making fun of Wei's work. This was because Wei's philosophy of suggesting learning from the barbarians was seen as a threat to the traditional Sinocentric worldview, which held China as the "Middle Kingdom" and the center of civilization.

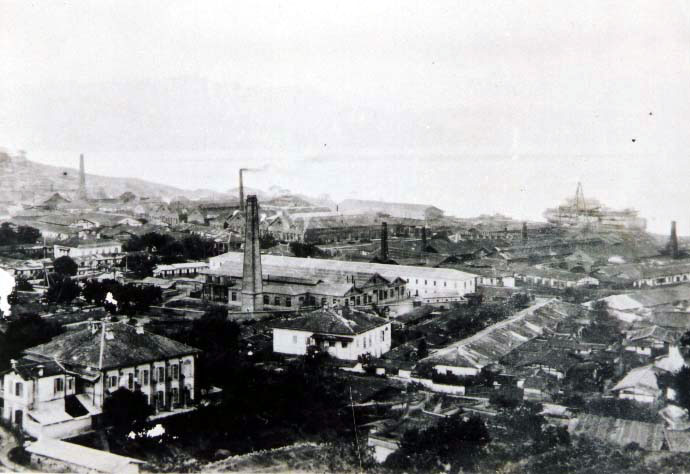
The Fuzhou Arsenal, built during the self-strengthening movement

However, Wei's ideas were not lost to history. Despite initial decades of negligence, the Qing government began considering Wei's philosophy in 1860 after suffering another devastating defeat in the Second Opium War and after the historical Old Summer Palace was destroyed. Qing royal Prince Gong and statesman Wenxiang were the first to make proposals based on Wei's philosophy, recommending the establishment of an office to direct foreign affairs in 1860. The two, alongside reformists and statesmen Li Hongzhang, Zeng Guofan, Feng Guifen, and Zuo Zongtang, initiated and spearheaded the self-strengthening movement, the Qing's first major attempt at modernising technologically and militarily using western technology, with Wei's philosophy at the centre of it. The six did this by constructing massive western shipyards and arsenals, aimed to produce modern, western steamships and guns. In this sense, Wei was the ignored prophet whose vision belatedly guided China's first halting steps toward modernization.

=== In Japan ===
The legacy of Wei's works surprisingly had a massive impact on Japan. For centuries, the Japanese monarchy had been suppressed by the Tokugawa shogunate, a military dictatorship. The shogunate had isolated Japan from most of the rest of the world for over 200 years, and posterior to the American Perry Expeditions, which proved the shogunate's weakness and inability to defend itself against western powers, many copies of Wei's works were illegally smuggled into Japan for western learning, where they were then eagerly read by reform-minded samurai. The book's detailed knowledge of the world and its arguments for "learning from the West to control the West" had a profound impact. For example, the Japanese scholar and reformer Yokoi Shōnan became convinced that Japan should pursue a "cautious, gradual and realistic opening" to the world to avoid China's mistakes. The Treatise was especially influential on figures like Takasugi Shinsaku and Yoshida Shōin, who would eventually lead Japan through the Meiji Restoration, which overthrew the shogunate and restored power to the monarchy. Afterwards, utilising the ideas of Wei's works, Japan began modernising rapidly, eventually even defeating Qing China in the First Sino-Japanese War of 1895 and catching up technologically and militarily to the west by the early 1900s.

Notably, When Takasugi visited Shanghai in 1862, he was dismayed to find that Wei's books was out of print in China and that the Chinese were not preparing to defend themselves. Rather than seeing this as a failure of the Chinese people, he "extracted lessons for the future of Japan," concluding that his own country must act decisively. The ideas in the Treatise thus directly contributed to Japan's transformation into a modern, industrialized nation.

== See also ==
- Chinese Learning as Substance, Western Learning for Application
- Self-Strengthening Movement
