= The Chinese Repository =

1832–51 English language magazine

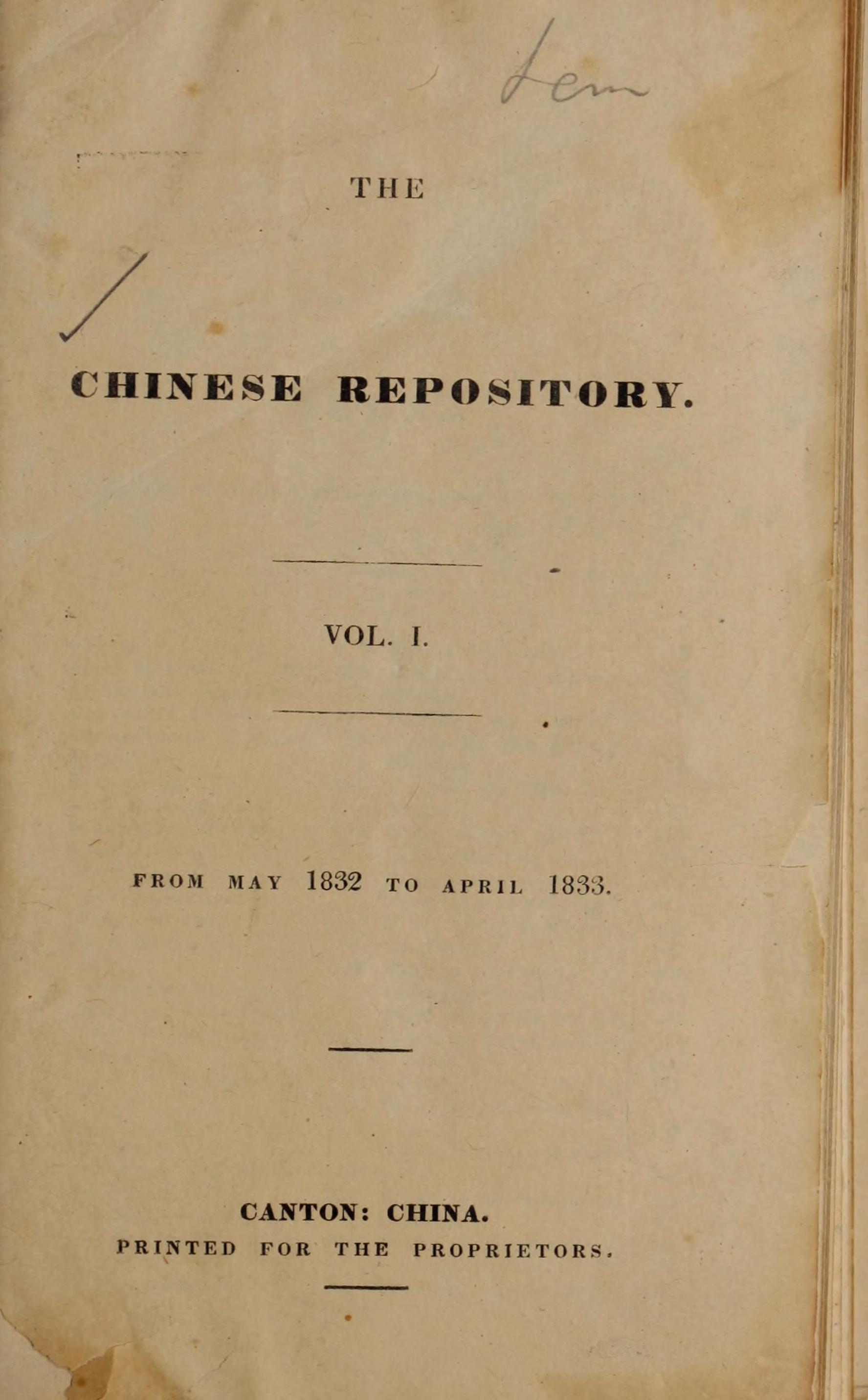
- Cover of first volume
- Editor: Elijah Coleman Bridgman; S. Wells Williams
- Founded: 1832
- Final issue: 1851
- Country: China
- Based in: Canton

The Chinese Repository was a periodical published in Canton between May 1832 and 1851 to inform Protestant missionaries working in Asia about the history and culture of China, of current events, and documents. It was the world's first major journal of Sinology.

The periodical was founded by Elijah Coleman Bridgman, the first American Protestant missionary appointed to China. Bridgman served as its editor until he left for Shanghai in 1847, but continued to contribute articles. James Granger Bridgman succeeded him as editor, until September 1848, when Samuel Wells Williams took charge.
