= Self-Strengthening Movement =

1861–1895 modernization and reform period in Qing China

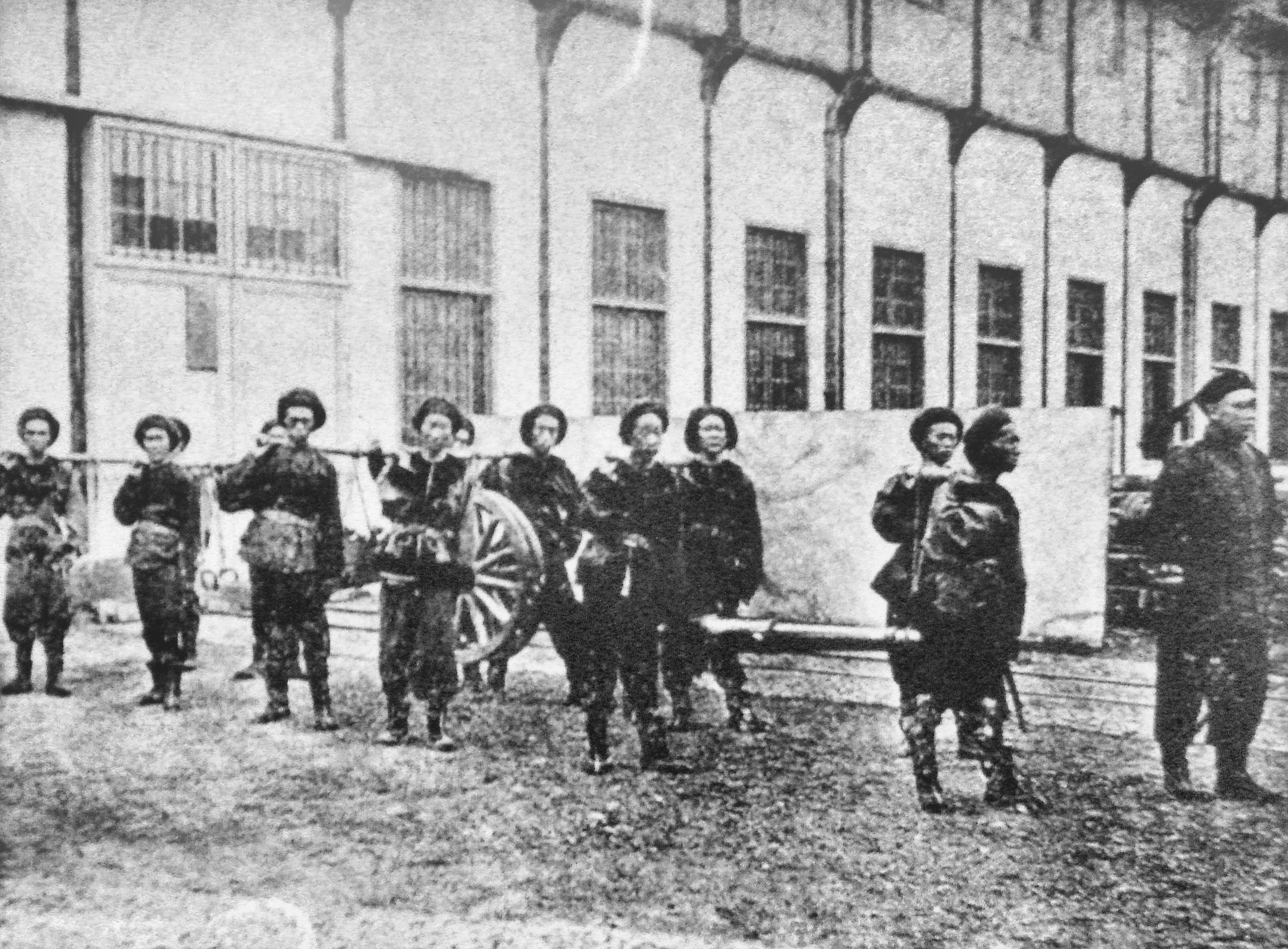
- Gun transportation at Shanghai's Jiangnan Arsenal.
- Traditional Chinese: 自強運動
- Simplified Chinese: 自强运动
Transcriptions
Standard Mandarin
- Hanyu Pinyin: zìqiáng yùndòng

Alternative Chinese name
- Traditional Chinese: 洋務運動
- Simplified Chinese: 洋务运动
- Literal meaning: Western Affairs Movement
Transcriptions
Standard Mandarin
- Hanyu Pinyin: yángwù yùndòng

The Self-Strengthening Movement, also known as the Westernization or Western Affairs Movement (c. 1861–1895), was a period of reforms initiated during the late Qing dynasty following the military disasters of the Opium Wars and Taiping Rebellion. These defeats exposed weaknesses in Qing military and administrative systems, prompting efforts to strengthen the state. These reforms included efforts across diplomatic, military, economic, and educational sectors.

In 1860, China's defeat in the Second Opium War and the successes of the Taiping Rebellion forced the imperial court to acknowledge a crisis. In 1861, Prince Gong and Grand Councilor Wen Xiang proposed establishing an office to direct foreign affairs. Prince Gong was made regent, Grand Councilor, and head of the newly formed Zongli Yamen (a de facto foreign affairs ministry). Local Han Chinese officials such as Zeng Guofan established private westernized militias in prosecuting the war against the rebels. Zeng and his armies eventually defeated the rebels and prosecuted efforts to import Western military technology and to translate Western scientific knowledge. They established successful arsenals, schools, and munitions factories.

In the 1870s and 1880s, their successors used their positions as provincial officials to build shipping, telegraph lines, and railways. China made substantial progress toward modernizing its heavy industry and military, but the majority of the ruling elite still subscribed to a conservative Confucian worldview, and the "self-strengtheners" were by and large uninterested in social reform beyond the scope of economic and military modernization. The Self-Strengthening Movement succeeded in securing the revival of the dynasty from the brink of eradication, sustaining it for another half-century. The considerable successes of the movement came to an abrupt end with China's defeat in the First Sino-Japanese War in 1895. Another major modernization effort known as the late Qing reforms started in 1901 following the failure of the Hundred Days' Reform and the invasions of the Eight-Nation Alliance.

== Etymology ==
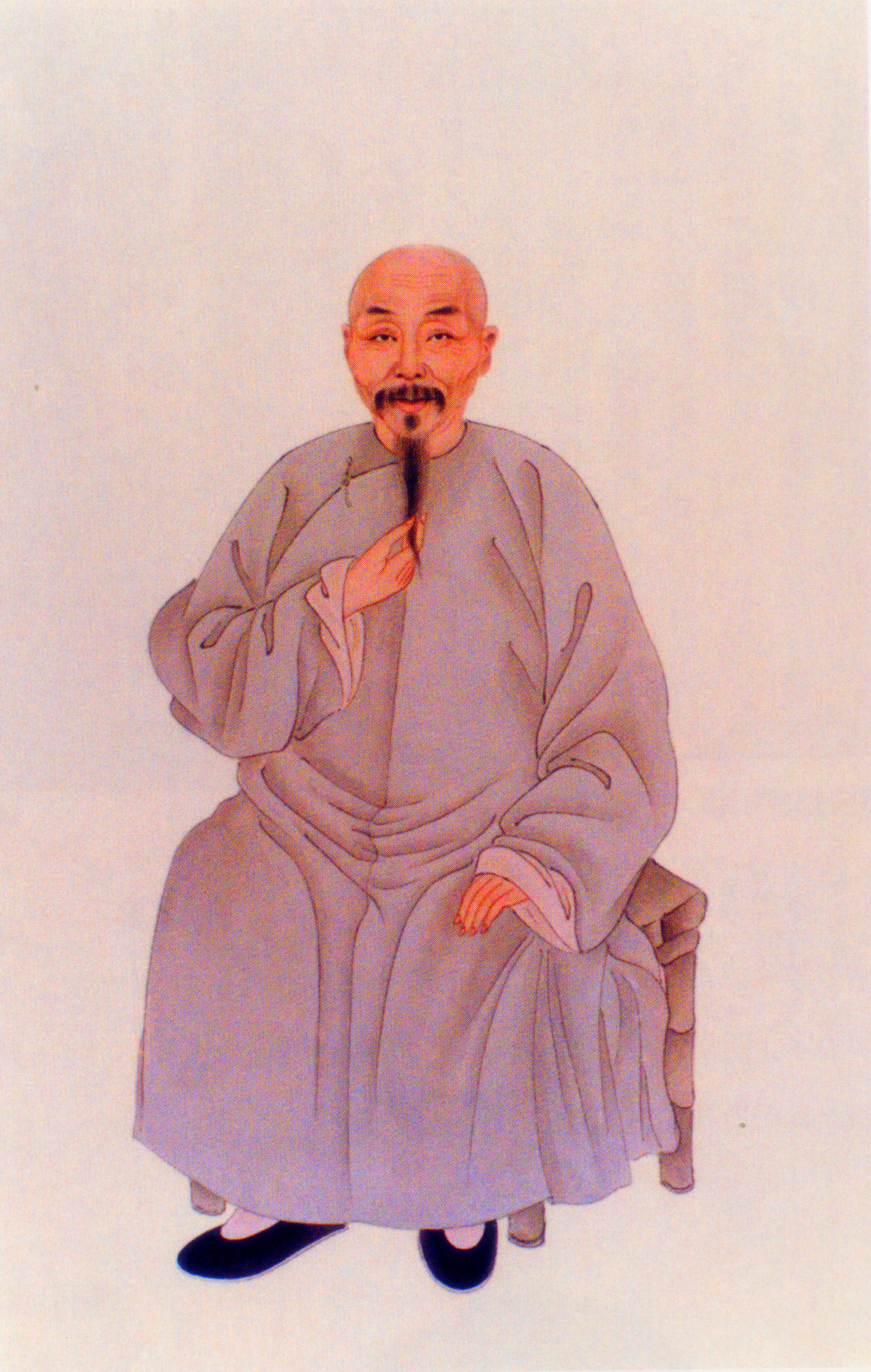
Feng Guifen, coiner of the phrase

The original use of the phrase "self-strengthening" is from the ancient Yijing, where it is written, "The superior man makes himself strong". The same phrase is encountered in use by the Southern Song dynasty in reference to dealing with the crisis of Jurchen invasion, and again by the Qianlong Emperor, writing that self-strengthening was requisite for warding off foreign aspirations.

As the eighteenth century drew to a close and the gradual decline of the Chinese bureaucracy became apparent, there was a rapid shift in the ideology of the Chinese Confucian Scholars towards the "School of Practical Learning" (jingshi) that argued for a practical approach to government and did not shy away from urging institutional reforms. These scholars came to co-opt ideas from the ancient Legalist philosophy such as fujiang, the focus on the wealth and power of the state.

The concern with the "self-strengthening" of China was expressed by Feng Guifen in a series of essays presented by him to Zeng Guofan in 1861. Feng obtained expertise in warfare commanding a volunteer corps in Qing government's campaign against the Taiping rebels. In 1860 he moved to Shanghai, where he was much impressed by Western military technology.

In his diaries, Zeng mentioned his self-strengthening rhetoric directed at technological modernization in an attempt to defend the nation's sovereignty and territorial integrity.

Li Hongzhang uses the term in an 1864 letter whereby he identifies the Western strength as lying in technology and advocates learning to construct such machines, first military and subsequently – in a memorial the following year – civilian. Other terms used to refer to the movement are the Westernization Movement or Western Affairs Movement.

== Background ==
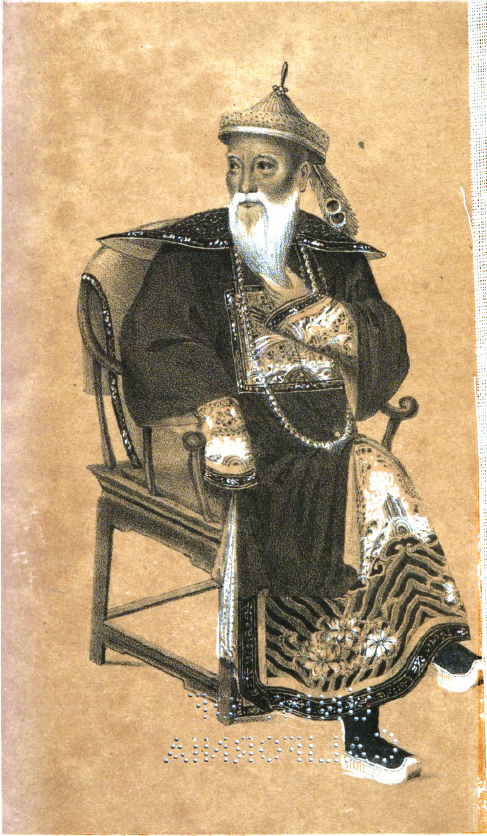
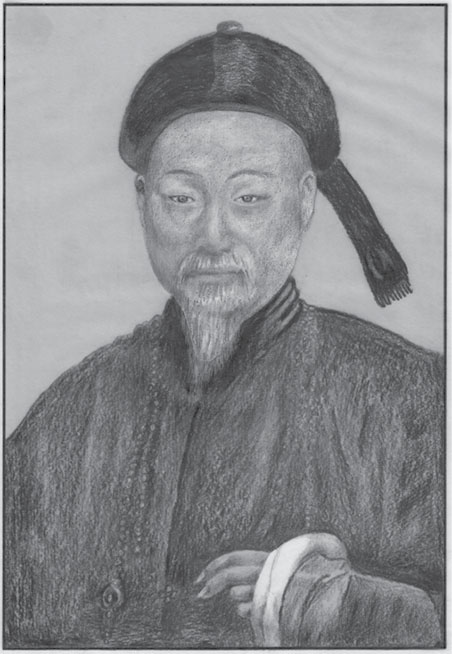
Portraits of Lin Zexu (left) and Qishan (right)

Early works by scholars such as Chen Lujiong (1730), Wang Dahai (1791), and Xie Qinggao (1820) already espoused the idea that Western countries were a threat due to their superior military technology: these scholars also called for the adoption of Western weapon technology.

Scholar official Wei Yuan, writing on behalf of Imperial Commissioners Lin Zexu and Qishan at the close of the First Opium War, expressed advocacy for production of Western armament and warships. By the 1830s and 1840s, proposals emerged urging the use of Western military technology for defense against foreign powers, as well as specific reforms to traditional institutions such as the Imperial Examinations to assist the propagation of the new technology. During the First Opium War, Lin Zexu purchased a few hundred guns and a ship from Europeans.

The Taiping Rebellion (1850–1864) was not primitive in terms of weapons, relatively. An ever growing number of Western weapons dealers and blackmarketeers sold Western weapons such as modern muskets, rifles, and cannons to the rebels. Taiping leadership advocated the adoption of railways and steamships among other Western developments. Zeng Guofan, official in Hunan province, begun recruitment for his privately managed militia, the Xiang Army, sourcing funds from local merchants, to combat the rebels, using Western weapons and training. Imperial forces encompassed the Ever Victorious Army, consisting of Chinese soldiers led by a European officer corps (see Frederick Townsend Ward and Charles Gordon), backed by British arms companies like Willoughbe & Ponsonby.

By 1860, the overwhelming bulk of the Chinese political class had become conscious of the radical transformation that was occurring. They now proclaimed that change was irresistible and advocated for deeper studies of Western technology.

In July 1861, Prince Gong declared that he had received imperial approbation for the purchase of foreign weapons for self-strengthening, initiating the reform movement.

== First phase (1861–1872) ==
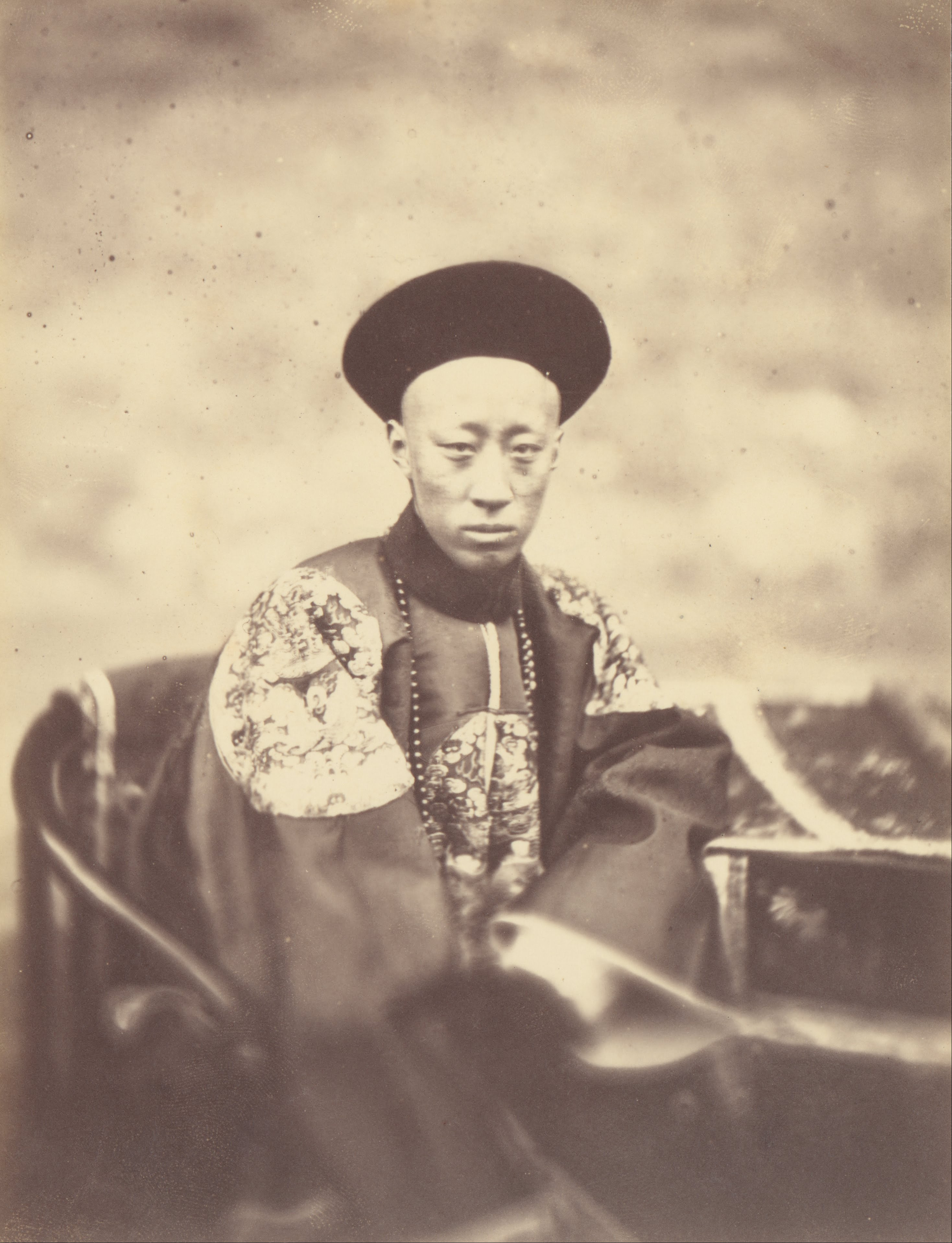
Photo of a 27-year-old Prince Gong.

The movement can be divided into three phases. The first lasted from 1861 to 1872, emphasized the adoption of Western firearms, machines, scientific knowledge and training of technical and diplomatic personnel through the establishment of a diplomatic office and a college. Feng Guifen believed that adopting Western technology was the best way to adapt to Western pressure.

The Tongwen Guan was established in 1862 by the joint advocacy of Prince Gong and Wenxiang, offering classes in English, French, Russian and German, in order to train diplomats to engage with Westerners. Li Hongzhang founded a similar language school in Shanghai in 1862, and another such school was established at Guangzhou in 1863 and Fuzhou in 1866. These schools became the pioneering vehicles of Western studies; in 1867 Astronomy and Mathematics was added to the Tongwen Guan curriculum.

The Chinese government officials were dominated by a desire to maintain peaceful relations with the Western powers through "trust", "faithfulness", "softness" and "patience", and they persuaded the Chinese public to accept Western presence in the treaty ports. However, foreign activities not covered by the treaties were strictly prohibited.

After the First Opium War, Western newspapers began to be translated into Chinese as a means of obtaining information about the West, and after 1851 this was expanded to Western books. These efforts were spearheaded by the Tongwen Guan and the Jiangnan Arsenal and distributed throughout the country. The Jiangnan Arsenal translated a total of 143 Western books in the period of 1868–1879. Chinese intellectual enthusiasm for Western science soared.

=== Superintendents of Trade ===
As a result of treaties with the Western powers, the two ports of Tianjin and Shanghai were opened to Western trade. Two officials titled Commissioner of Trade for the southern and northern ports, respectively were appointed to administer foreign trade matters at the newly opened ports.

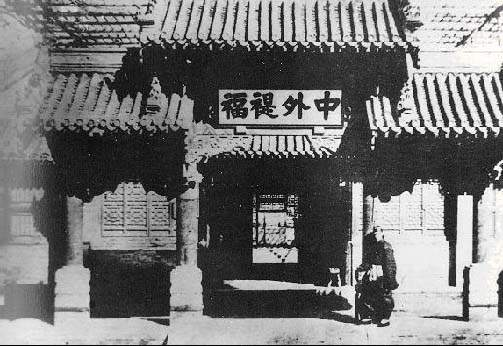
Front gate of the Zongli Yamen, the de facto foreign affairs ministry.

Although the ostensible reason for the establishment of these two government offices was to administer the new treaty ports, the underlying reasons for their establishment were more complicated: these superintendents were supposed to confine to the ports all diplomatic dealings with foreigners, rather than burdening the central government in Beijing with them. The authority of the commissioners also came to include the overseeing of all new undertakings utilizing Western knowledge and personnel; thus, they became the coordinators of most self-strengthening efforts.

Li Hongzhang was the Tianjin Superintendent from 1870 and was so successful in taking over the functions of the Zongli Yamen that communication between the imperial court and the foreign diplomats at Beijing were kept under the auspices of the Self-Strengthening reformers.

This phase was also the first time that they began to work on the treaties that would later be instated.

==== Maritime Customs Service (1861) ====
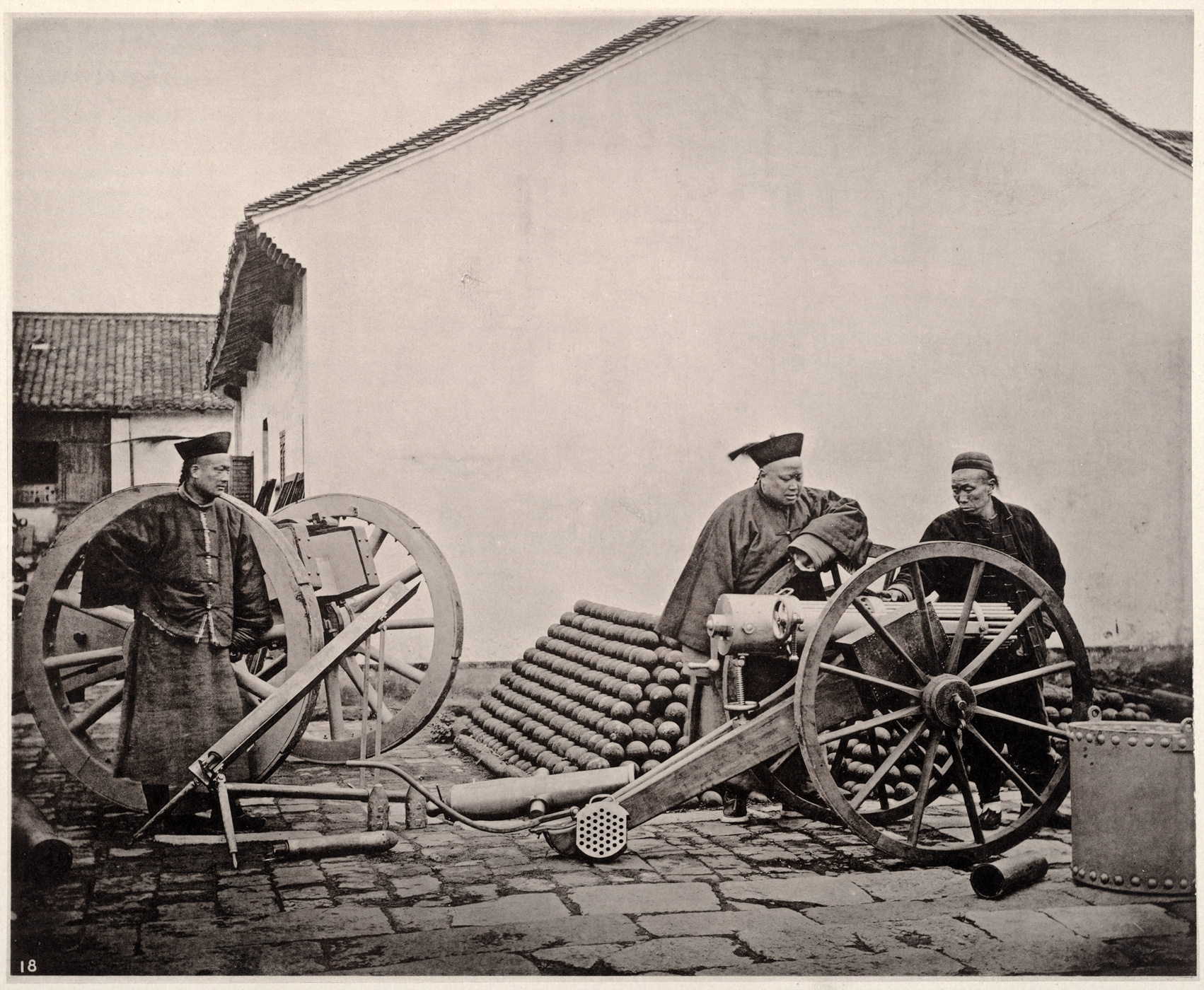
Nanjing Jinling Arsenal, built by Li Hongzhang in 1872.

A British national, Horatio Nelson Lay, was appointed as the Inspector-General of the Imperial Maritime Customs Service, which was established in April 1861. This office evolved from the foreign-run Inspectorate of Customs founded in 1854, which had originated in the Provisional System established in 1853 by the foreign powers. This was made possible due to the collapse of Chinese governmental authority in Shanghai after Taiping Rebellion advances in the vicinity. The office was designed to collect tariffs equitably and generate new revenues for the Qing imperial court from the import dues on foreign goods, a duty impossible for Chinese officials who were now powerless to enforce their authority on foreigners. Lay's main duty was to exercise surveillance over all aspects of maritime revenue and to supervise the Chinese inspector superintendents who collected revenue at the various treaty ports. Rather than being an innovation, this move merely institutionalized a system which had been in existence since 1854.

For the latter half of the nineteenth century, China would be maximally exploited through the foreign Maritime Customs Service's exercise of treaty tariffs on opium and other goods, inland navigation, colonies, concession territories, and extraterritoriality. The maritime customs service ensured the Chinese government a reliable and growing source of new revenue. Customs revenues increased from 8.5 million taels of silver in 1865 to 14.5 million taels in 1885. Customs revenue paid off the 1860 indemnities. It also furnished part or all of the revenues of such new undertakings as the Beijing Tongwen Guan, the Jiangnan and Xingu Arsenals, the Fuzhou Navy Yard, and the educational mission to the United States. The customs service also played an important role in checking smuggling. It also charted the Chinese coast and installed lighthouses, beacons, and other modern aids to maritime navigation.

As a result of a conflict with the Chinese government regarding the use of British naval units to suppress the Taiping Rebellion, Lay was replaced by Sir Robert Hart in 1863. Hart tried to do more than ensure that the customs service provided a steady flow of revenue to the Qing imperial court. He tried to initiate some reforms that would contribute towards Self-Strengthening: he advocated for the establishment of a national mint and post office, as well as trying to help China organize a modern naval fleet. However, he was unable to win acceptance for any of his ideas because the imperial court was not willing to allow foreigners to play an active role in the Self-Strengthening Movement.

=== Military modernization ===
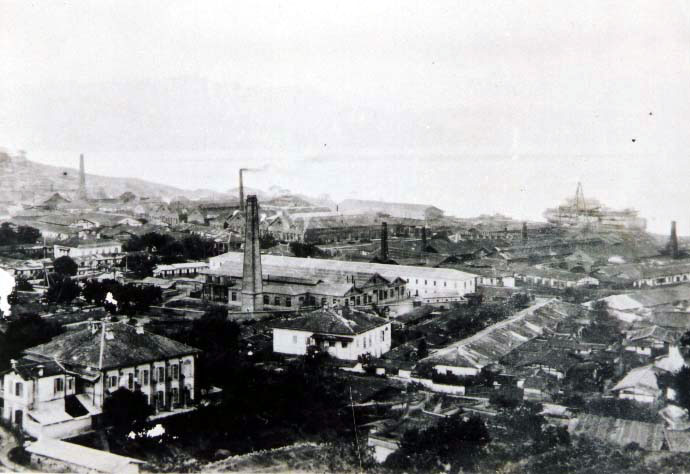
The Fuzhou Arsenal in Mawei District, Fuzhou, Fujian.

Chinese warship Yangwu, built at the Fuzhou Arsenal in 1872.

The most important goal of the Self-Strengthening Movement was the development of military industries; namely, the construction of military arsenals and of shipbuilding dockyards to strengthen the Chinese navy. The program was handicapped by several problems:

This program was spearheaded by regional leaders like Zeng Guofan who, with the efforts of the western-educated Yung Wing, established the Shanghai arsenal, Li Hongzhang who built the Nanjing and Tianjin Arsenals, and Zuo Zongtang who constructed the Fuzhou Dockyard. The arsenals were established with the help of foreign advisors and administrators, such as Léonce Verny who helped build the Ningbo Arsenal in 1862–64, or the French officer Prosper Giquel who directed the construction of the Fuzhou Arsenal in 1867–74. Zeng and Li collaborated to construct the Jiangnan Arsenal. Schools for the study of mechanical skills and navigation under the direction of foreign advisers were established at these arsenals and dockyards. As these powerful regional strongmen were able to act independently of the central government, there was little coordination between the provinces and the government.

These military industries were largely sponsored by the government. As such, they suffered from the usual bureaucratic inefficiency and nepotism. Many of the Chinese administrative personnel were sinecure holders who got on the payroll through influence.

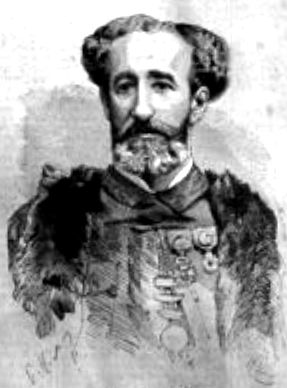
Prosper Giquel, builder of the Fuzhou Arsenal

The program proved expensive: Li Hongzhang had wanted the Jiangnan Arsenal to produce breech loading rifles of the Remington type. Production finally started in 1871 and produced only 4,200 rifles by 1873: these rifles were not only more costly than, but also far inferior to, the imported Remington arms. Shipbuilding efforts were also disappointing: the program consumed half of the arsenal's annual income but the ships built were at least twice as costly as comparable vessels available for purchase in Britain. The lack of material and human resources proved to be a formidable problem. The program was heavily reliant on foreign expertise and materials. The unavoidable growth in the number of foreign employees had made increased costs inevitable. Furthermore, officials were not even aware when the foreigners were not competent enough to perform the tasks that they had been hired to do. Laxity in procurement practices also contributed to escalating costs. Army organization was reformed during this period. The Chinese government had spent a huge amount of money on military equipment and guidance from the West. Thus, it behooved the imperial court to use what they had learned to raise a new army.

Another area of reform concerned the modernization of military organization and structure. The most urgent reform was to reduce the Green Standard forces to a fraction of its size and to modernize the remainder. In 1862, the Imperial court began the training of the Peking Field Force, a unit of 30,000 Western-armed and Western-drilled soldiers drawn from the Eight Banners. The project was under the direction of Wenxiang and Prince Chun, appointed by Empress Dowager Cixi. Due to the shortage of capable Manchu recruits, the reform efforts turned toward the bulk of the army, the Green Standard forces. These were scaled down in size with the savings used to upgrade weapons. They were also modified to allow for commanders to stay for longer command tours, have the authority to remove unsatisfactory subordinates, and for new recruits to be drawn from the local general population rather than the military families of other provinces. The retrained, westernized Green Standard forces were subsequently known as the lianzhun (retrained troops). Some units of the old Green Standard Army forces were integrated under the command of the modernized Huai army's commanders. Huai general Zhou Shengchuan, who was well-versed in Western armaments, advocated for the purchase and proper maintenance for Gatling guns, Krupp cannons, and Remington or Snyder rifles, alongside full training for their use. He was also strongly supportive of modern medicine, rail, and telegraphy, and modern combat tactics such as prone position and night fighting.

In 1872, the U.S. Ambassador to China Frederick Low said: "That you may the better understand my reasons for this opinion, some facts in regard to the present organization of Chinese military forces may be useful. With the exception of troops immediately in and about Peking (Beijing), the military forces of the empire are made up of separate armies that have been raised and organized by, and are practically under control of, the several high provincial officers each viceroy being held responsible by the Imperial Government for a suitable quota of troops to maintain order within his own jurisdiction, and, in case of extreme emergency, to help suppress insurrection or repel invasion in other provinces. Theoretically, all the officers are directly the appointees of the emperor; practically, they are selected by the several viceroys whose nominations are simply approved by the central government. At the present time all the foreigners employed in instructing troops in the art of war are subject to provincial authority and control. They are little better in point of rank and position than 'drill-sergeants,' a position which, if not degrading, cannot be considered honorable. Even General Ward and Colonel Gordon, who were employed to assist in putting down the Taiping rebellion, were engaged and paid by the viceroy at Nanking, although the Central Government gave to them a tacit but not real imperial position". Charles Gordon strongly preferred providing assistance to the regional Yong Ying rather than the "helpless" central government. After he returned to England, the subsequent Chinese-hired British trainers sent by the British consulate were incompetent and neglected their duties.

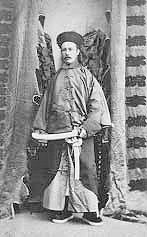
"Chinese Gordon"

A school for the navy was established in Fuzhou in 1866, under Zuo Zongtang. Both technical training and officer training schools were established in the yard in 1867.

=== Political ===
In 1864, Li Hongzhang submitted proposals to add a new subject into the Imperial examinations involving Western technology, that scholars may focus their efforts entirely on this. A similar proposal was tabled by Feng Guifen in 1861 and Ding Richang (mathematics and science) in 1867. Jestingly, Li described himself as "Changing Chinese ways through Barbarian Ways" (用夷變夏); recognizing that China now faced its most severe upheaval in 3,000 years, his assistance to traditional learning was largely perfunctory.

== Second phase (1872–1885) ==
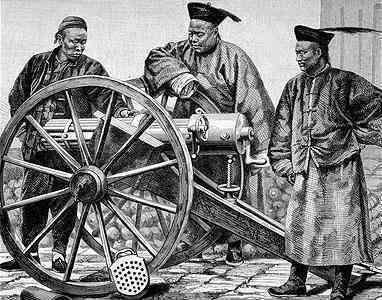
Chinese Qing officers with a Montigny mitrailleuse.

In 1870, a number of foreigners were killed during riots in Tianjin. This incident soured China's relatively stable relations with the Western powers and marked the end of the first period of the Self-Strengthening Movement. By the second period, Li Hongzhang had emerged as the most important leader of the reform movement. He played a pivotal role in starting and supporting many of the initiatives during this period. Over 90 percent of the modernization projects were launched under his aegis.

During this phase, commerce, industry, and agriculture received increasing attention. Attention was also given to the creation of wealth in order to strengthen the country. This was a new idea for the Chinese, who had always been uncomfortable with activities which create wealth from anything other than land. The development of profit-oriented industries such as shipping, railways, mining, and telegraphy were therefore rather new ventures for the Chinese government.

The Qing government sanctioned what was known as "government-supervised merchant undertakings". These were profit-oriented enterprises which were operated by merchants but which were supervised by government officials. Capital for these enterprises came from private sources but the government also provided subsidies in some cases.

Examples of such government-supervised merchant undertakings include the China Merchants' Steam Navigation Company in 1872, the Kaiping Mines in 1877, the Shanghai Cotton Mill in 1882, and the Imperial Telegraph Administration in 1881.

However, being government-supervised, these enterprises could not escape from the ugly sides of bureaucratic administration: they suffered from nepotism, corruption, and lack of initiative. Managers also found ways to siphon off profits in order to avoid the payment of official levies and exactions. They also monopolized business in their respective areas, and by thus discouraging private competition, they impeded economic development. Despite its economic inefficiencies, the merchant-bureaucrat combination remained the principal device for initiating industrial enterprises.

Alerted to the tendency for Chinese merchants to invest in foreign business, Li Hongzhang sought to extend governmental assistance to Chinese entrepreneurs engaged in competition against foreign enterprise. The China Merchants' Steam Company was a poignant instance of success in regaining control of shipping traffic markets. Management and capital were entirely removed from governmental hands, and handed to various comprador traders. From 1872 to 1877, the company expanded from four to twenty nine steamships, far outstripping the six and five of its rivals Jardine Matheson and Butterfield-Swire. Similar plans were drafted for coal and iron mines, and textile mills. In 1876, Shen Baozhen succeeded in initiating construction of the Keelung Coal Mine in Taiwan, the first modern coal mine in China, to fuel the Fuzhou Navy Yard.

Li Hongzhang, in an 1874 memorial, tabled the concept of "Bureaus of Western Learning" (洋學局) in coastal provinces, participation in which was to be accorded the honor of Imperial examination degrees. Li expanded the Tianjin Arsenal, founded a Western science school, and sent cadets to Germany. Ding Richang and Shen Baozhen also implemented similar plans in Southern China with the Nanjing and Jiangnan Arsenals. Chinese government schools in Beijing, the Fuzhou Navy Yard and the Jiangnan Arsenal had begun to teach Western mathematics, as this subject was pinpointed as the core of Western technological superiority. In 1872, and again in 1874, Shen Baozhen submitted another proposal to the throne for the reform of the Military Imperial Examinations with the inclusion of Mathematics, but the proposal was rejected on the basis that the pool of candidates were still too small to justify an examination. Shen also proposed the abolition of the military examinations which were based on obsolete weaponry such as archery. He proposed the idea that Tongwen Guan students who performed well in mathematics could be directly appointed to the Zongli Yamen as if they were Imperial examination graduates.

Shen Baozhen proposed a telegraph line, the first Chinese-built line in China, from Fuzhou to Mawei and Xiamen, and then proceeding across to Taiwan, but due to trickery by the Danish company contracted to build the line, the line fell into foreign control and became a threat to Chinese sovereignty by enabling foreigners to communicate faster than Chinese regarding Chinese affairs. The lines were then dismantled and reassembled in Taiwan for defense outpost communication.

=== Military education and training ===
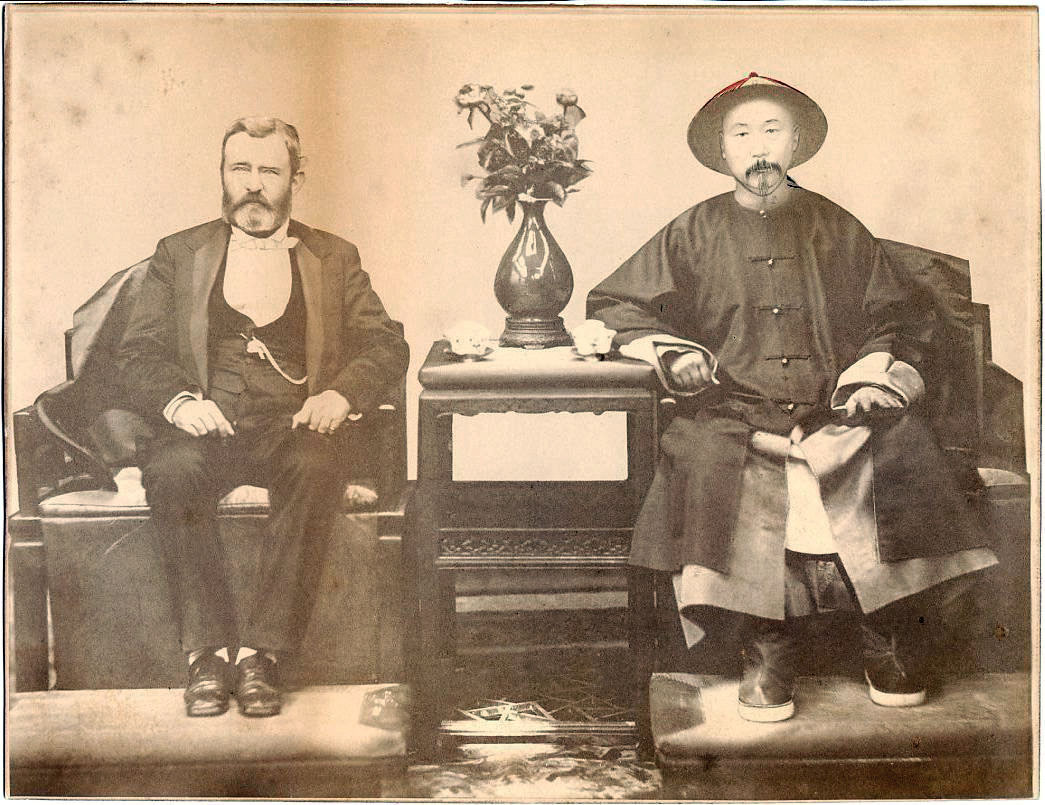
Premier Li Hongzhang with former President Ulysses S. Grant, 1879

Modern military education system was established and the new national defense strategy was promoted during the period.

The Chinese Educational Mission to the United States was launched under Li Hongzhang's sponsorship in 1872. One objective was to get Chinese cadets enrolled in the US Military Academy at West Point and the US Naval Academy at Annapolis, in accordance with the Burlingame Treaty of 1868. However the academies refused to admit the Chinese cadets, and conservative opposition in the court ended the mission in 1881.

The idea of training for the navy began at 1872. At the time the minister of warship and vessel, Shen Baozhen suggested to deploy the trainees for the navy. However, due to the lack of financial support, this plan wasn't put into practice initially. The plan caught the government's attention a year later. Ministers saw the importance of having a modern navy and the necessity of learning advanced navigation skills. In 1875 a batch of navy cadets of the Fuzhou Navy Yard were sent to France and England for further study. Supported by Li Hongzhang and Zuo Zongtang, in 1877 Shen picked 30 trainees and also deployed them to the Great Britain and France for training. This plan underpinned the formation of the Beiyang Fleet, the largest fleet in Asia at that time. More cadets went in 1882 and again in 1886.

The Chinese government regarded modern education as a necessity. Li Hongzhang gave modern military education significant support. Aside from his contribution to the building of arsenals such as Jiangnan Arsenal, in 1872 he had arranged a cadre of Chinese officers to go to Germany. The purpose of the cadre was to study at the Germany military academy in Berlin. Modern military education was not the only thing the Chinese government focused on. During the Self-Strengthening Movement, the Chinese government had set up many classes to study abroad including Japan, the U.S. and Germany. The purpose was to learn modern science and catch up to the most developed countries as fast as possible.

Another naval academy was opened in Tianjin in 1880 through the efforts of Li Hongzhang.

Despite efforts to introduce modern military education and training the Qing army did not universally adopt such methods the existing officer corps did not adopt western drill or sound military training, the officers even opposed efforts to train troops in a centralised manner. Target practice was often conducted at a distance of 50 ft when engagements would take place at a distance several times greater, though training with guns was uncommon and most troops conducted drill armed with spears.

=== Ili Crisis and Sino-French War ===
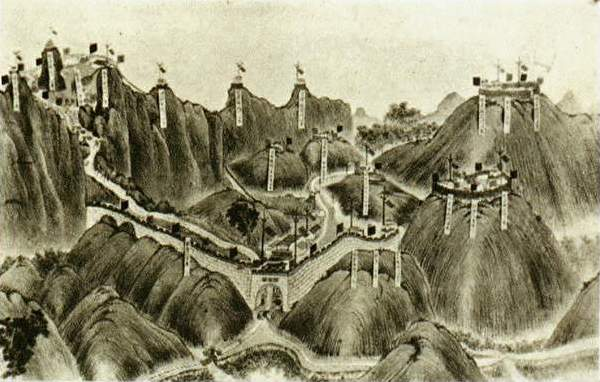
Chinese fortifications, Sino-Vietnamese border

During the Ili crisis when Qing China threatened to go to war against Russia over the Russian occupation of Ili, the British officer Charles George Gordon was sent to China by Britain to advise China on military options against Russia should a potential war break out between China and Russia. The Qing dynasty forced Russia to hand over disputed territory in the Treaty of Saint Petersburg (1881), in what was widely seen by the West as a diplomatic victory for the Qing. Russia acknowledged that Qing China potentially posed a serious military threat. The Russians observed the Chinese building up their arsenal of modern weapons during the Ili crisis, the Chinese bought thousands of rifles from Germany. In 1880 massive amounts of military equipment and rifles were shipped via boats to China from Antwerp as China purchased torpedoes, artillery, and 260,260 modern rifles from Europe. Compared to Russian controlled areas, more benefits were given to the Muslim Kirghiz on the Chinese controlled areas. Russian settlers fought against the Muslim nomadic Kirghiz, which led the Russians to believe that the Kirghiz would be a liability in any conflict against China. The Muslim Kirghiz were sure that in an upcoming war China would defeat Russia. Russian sinologists, the Russian media, threat of internal rebellion, the pariah status inflicted by the Congress of Berlin, the negative state of the Russian economy all led Russia to concede and negotiate with China in St Petersburg, and return most of Ili to China.

The Huai Army was able to match up against the French forces in combat on Taiwan, during the Sino-French War. When the French attempted to seize Taiwan's Keelung forts, and attack near Tamsui, they were beaten back by Huai soldiers. The French were also beaten back at the Battle of Bang Bo and Battle of Phu Lam Tao, causing sufficient embarrassment to the French government that it ended the Prime Minister's career, and the Chamber of Deputies was only three votes short of a withdrawal from Vietnam.

=== The Manchurian Army ===
A scheme had been planned in 1884 for the raising of an army in Manchuria for the defence of the region, it was intended for 10,000 men per province (30,000 total) to be trained annually for 1 year and for a strong army to be formed from the region. However, the actual implementation of this plan was not perfect and actual enrollment fell far before expectations. The troops were noted by the Japanese as being superior to those from the Yong Ying, green standard and even the bannermen.

James noted in 1888 that the Manchurian army was 60,000–80,0000 men strong with a western-trained portion fewer than 15,000; a plurality were armed with Remington rifles and the remainder with muskets and Enfield rifles, melee weapons and jingals were still common. The artillery possessed a few batteries of foreign guns but the majority were small muzzleloaders. James further notes that 15,000 of the militia bannermen were to be converted into regulars and an arsenal was founded in Jilin. Wu Dacheng was appointed to organise the Manchurian army and in the decade leading up to the war the force should have provided 300,000 soldiers however, it was reported that only 170,000 men were organised and of that less than 15,000 were actually combat ready, a complete failure.

== Third phase (1885–1895) ==
In the third phase of reforms, stronger efforts were taken to coordinate the overall military modernization with the creation of the Navy Board. Efforts were taken to reduce government interference in industrial projects in an attempt to increase profitability, while light industry was promoted by the government.

By this period, the enthusiasm for reform had slowed down to a crawl. The conservative faction at court had managed to overwhelm Prince Gong and his supporters.

While the emphasis on building tall structures and industries continued, the idea of enriching the country through the textile industry gained the court's favor; thus industries like textiles and cotton-weaving developed rapidly.

Examples of such enterprises included Guizhou Ironworks established in 1891 and the Hubei Textile Company established in 1894. Like all other newly sprouted enterprises of its kind, they were very weak and represented only a small fraction of the total investment in industry.

Zhang Zhidong established the state-owned Hubei Textile Mill in 1889. However, all of its profits were diverted to fund the Hanyang Ironworks also established in the same year. Zhang also succeeded in starting local minting of silver coinage in 1889, following the model of the Spanish silver dollar. These "dragon dollars", named after their dragon design, were intended to be China's response to the spread of foreign coins. They were the first domestically mass-produced machine-minted silver coins.

The Shanghai Cotton Cloth Mill was profitable, distributing a dividend of 25 percent in 1893.

In 1887, the Mohe Gold Mining Company was established; it began operations in 1888. From 1888 to 1891, 62,000 ounces of gold was processed, turning a profit.

However, in 1888, the Imperial examinations were expanded to include the subject of international commerce. In 1889, a court conference regarding the initiation of railway construction was almost unanimously in favor of the proposal, but concerns of further erosion of sovereignty to foreign domination precluded foreign investment (and ownership), and the government's finances itself were found insufficient. By 1892 the Kaiping Mines were producing 187,000 tons of coal, greatly reducing the need for the now-300,000 tons of foreign import.

As a result of the Sino-French War, a financial crisis occurred in Shanghai which led many business to collapse, the industrial projects included. Embezzlement had also occurred due to the absence of an independent auditor in such businesses.

While the Qing government deployed trainees for the navy, army training was also deemed as priority. Especially after the first Sino-Japanese War, many military leaders saw its importance. Before the first Sino-Japanese War the Qing government didn't balance the concentration on the two types of military forces. Having experienced the great failure of the first Sino-Japanese War and the complete demise of Beiyang Fleet, they started to focus on the land army training. Since 1876 the government of Qing had sent thousands of officers to military academies in different countries, including Japan, Germany, Great Britain and France.

In 1885, with assistance from Germany, Li Hongzhang established the Tientsin (Tianjin) Military Academy. The academy offered a two-year program taught by Imperial German Army officers in German language medium. Subjects included drill, fortifications, surveying, mathematics and science.

There was also a naval academy established in Lüshun (Dalian, or Port Arthur). A naval college was inaugurated in Guangzhou in 1887, and yet another at Weihai in 1889, and one at Jiangning (Nanjing) in 1891.

=== Sino-Japanese War ===
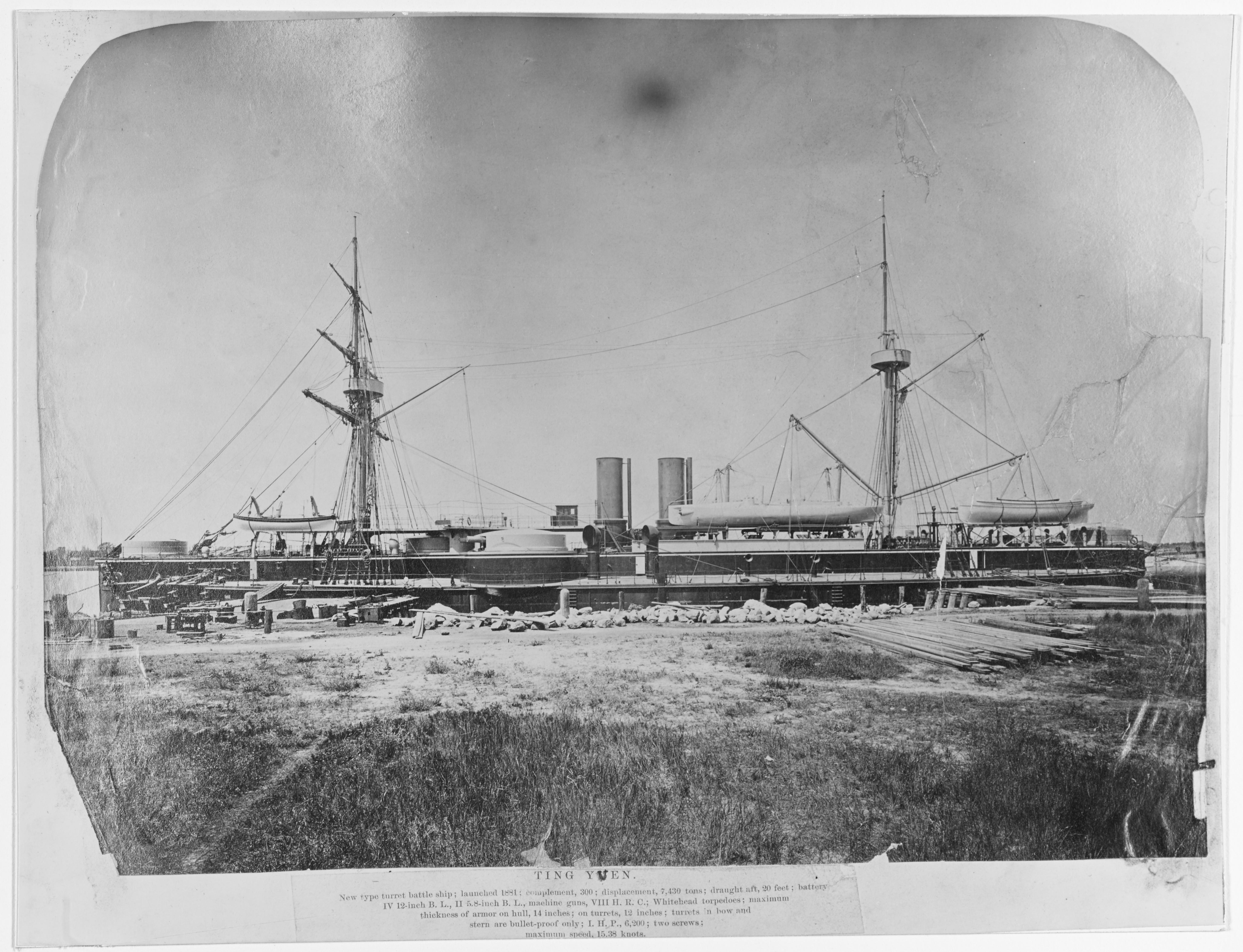
Chinese ironclad battleship Dingyuan, the flagship of the Beiyang Fleet

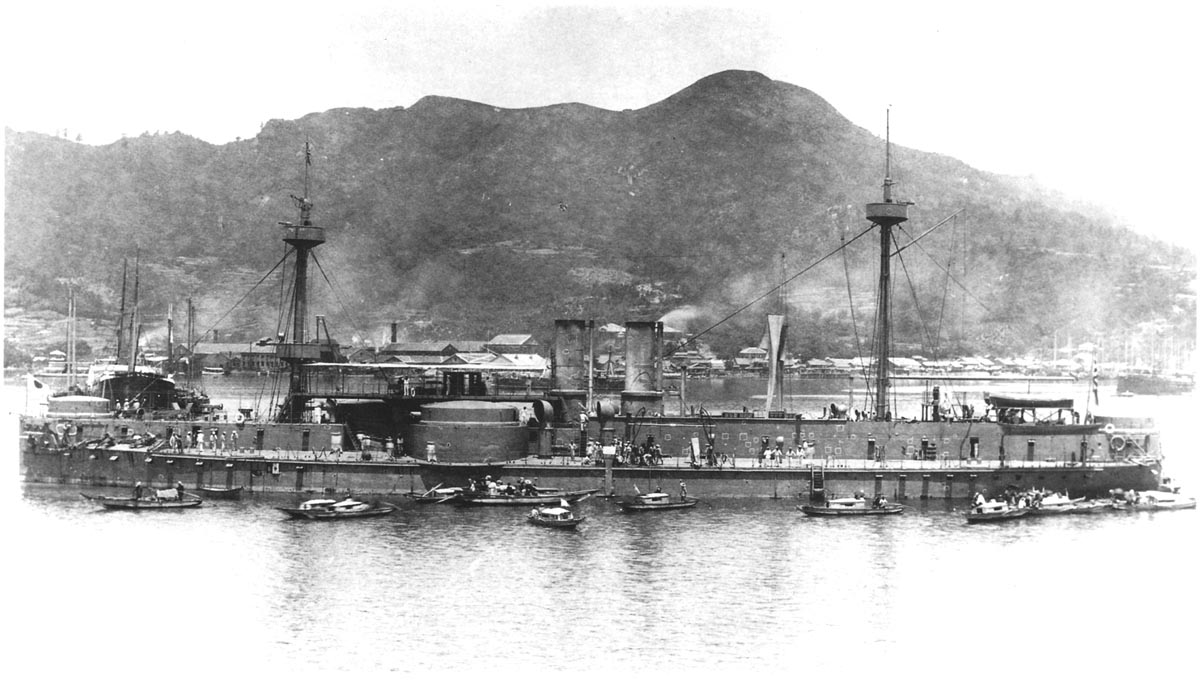
Sister ship of the Dingyuan, ironclad battleship Zhenyuan

The British observer Demetrius Charles de Kavanagh Boulger suggested a British-Chinese alliance to check Russian expansion in Central Asia, suggesting a belief in effectual Chinese military capacity. The Russian military observer D.V. Putiatia visited the China–Russia border in 1888 and observed Chinese soldiers in northeastern China, which had shrunk two decades earlier by the Russian Amur Annexation of Outer Manchuria. They, Putiatia observed, were potentially able to become adept at "European tactics" under certain circumstances, and the Chinese soldiers were armed with modern weapons like Krupp artillery, Winchester carbines, and Mauser rifles.

Foreign observers reported that, when their training was complete, the troops stationed in the Wuchang garrison were the equal of contemporary European forces. Mass media in the west during this era portrayed China as a rising military power due to its modernization programs and as a major threat to the western world, invoking fears that China would successfully conquer western colonies like Australia. Chinese armies were praised by John Russell Young, US envoy, who commented that "nothing seemed more perfect" in military capabilities, predicting a future confrontation between America and China."

On the eve of the First Sino-Japanese War, the German General Staff predicted a victory for China and William Lang, who was a British advisor to the Chinese military, praised Chinese training, ships, guns, and fortifications, stating that "in the end, there is no doubt that Japan must be utterly crushed".

When it was first developed by Empress Dowager Cixi, the Beiyang Fleet was said to be the strongest navy in East Asia. Before her adopted son, Emperor Guangxu, took over the throne in 1889, Cixi wrote out explicit orders that the navy should continue to develop and expand gradually. However, after Cixi went into retirement, all naval and military development came to a drastic halt. Japan's victories over China has often been falsely rumored to be the fault of Cixi. Many believed that Cixi was the cause of the navy's defeat by embezzling funds from the navy in order to build the Summer Palace in Beijing. However, extensive research by Chinese historians revealed that Cixi was not the cause of the Chinese navy's decline. In actuality, China's defeat was caused by Emperor Guangxu's lack of interest in developing and maintaining the military. His close adviser, Grand Tutor Weng Tonghe, advised Guangxu to cut all funding to the navy and army, because he did not see Japan as a true threat, and there were several natural disasters during the early 1890s which the emperor thought to be more pressing to expend funds on.

== Evaluation ==
Historians are generally divided into two camps: those such as Michael Gasster (1972) and Kwang-Ching Liu who perceive the self-strengthening movement as an inadequate reform program that was doomed to failure because of its conservative ideology, and those such as Li Chien Nung, Samuel Chu, and Benjamin Elman who focus on the political struggles in the Qing government, while another view was presented by Luke S. K. Kwong (1984) who argued that the movement has been wrongly perceived as a failure because it was not meant to be a defense strategy to ward off further military losses; he argues that it was only meant to be an adaptive reform, and it succeeded in that Western ideas did spread through trade, building of academies and overseas education.

Historian Immanuel C. Y. Hsu argues the movement was a superficial attempt to modernize limited areas of Chinese society. In striking contrast to the much more thorough modernization program at the same time in Japan, in China he says that there were no attempts to study or assimilate western institutions, philosophy or culture. There was a superficial emphasis on western military technology that proved a failure in actual warfare against France in 1884 and Japan in 1894. Hsu identifies six major weaknesses. First lack of coordination, in which provincial authorities went their own way with little cooperation with the national government. After the Taiping Rebellion the central government was too weak to coordinate the provinces. Second the limited vision of key leaders such as Li Hongzhang and Zeng Guofang. They did not attempt to make China into a modern state, but rather tried to strengthen the old order militarily. This reflects a broader limitation of the movement, as reforms focused on adopting Western technology while largely preserving existing political and institutional structures. Thirdly there was a shortage of capital. What profits enterprises created were redistributed to shareholders and not reinvested, so there was little economic growth. Fourth, the Western powers and Imperial Japan maintained heavy pressure on China that prevented a concentration on internal enemies. However they did support modernizing developments in the Treaty Ports. Fifthly there was a moral sense of Chinese traditional superiority over modern Western values. This produced on the one hand excessive caution, and an overabundance of incompetence, and continued corruption. Finally the great majority of the gentry and Mandarins regarded foreign affairs and the West in general as vulgar and hostile to the glories of Chinese civilization.

In contrast to the idea that the Movement was a "mere illusion", David Pong states that some scholars hold a very divergent view, that the movement was a "near-success". Wang Erh-min and other historians contend that Confucian ideology was not incompatible with Western ideas but in some cases was a basis for the formulation of new ideas: some scholars were receptive to Western science, technology and even political institutions. The Chinese understanding of Confucianism was transformed during self-strengthening, turning towards practicality (the School of Practical Statecraft, substantial learning). Albert Feuerwerker argues that this shift ultimately was connected to the reform proposals of the 1890s, i.e. the Hundred Days' Reform, and thence the New Policies. Western science was integrated into the Confucian worldview as an interpretation and application of Confucian principles. For some reformist scholars the focus on Confucianism was eroded in favor of Legalist principles of bianfa (state reform), fuqiang (state wealth and power) and even shangzhan (economic warfare).

In the view of Frances Moulder, Japan and China's premodern societies were largely alike. The failure of the Self-Strengthening movement as compared to the Meiji Restoration should therefore be attributed to China's greater economic exposure to the outside world (as compared to Japan's Sakoku), which led to more extensive Western incursion. This led to more severe socioeconomic upheavals in China due to the Opium Wars and associated rebellions. This in turn became the root of the Chinese government's unraveling and decentralization, damaged China's ability to finance development.

Two sources of conflict characterized Court politics during the period of the Self-Strengthening Movement. The first was the struggle for influence between the conservative and progressive/pragmatic factions in court. The other was the conflict between the central government's interests and new regional interests. These tensions determined the character and ultimately the successes and failures of the movement.

The arsenals, shipyards, and other facilities established through the movement became places where China was exposed to foreign scientific knowledge and foreign engineering.

=== Court politics ===
Opponents of the reforms argued that public funds were better spent on building public support for the government, and they suggested that westernized officials may no longer be loyal to China. It was pointed out in court debates that the United States and Russia, both possessing a vastly inferior navy to the British, defeated or at least challenged British dominance. Industrialization was criticized for potentially raising unemployment by eliminating jobs in the manual manufacturing sector, or that the purchase of industrial equipment would worsen income inequality as these would only be owned by, and benefit, the rich. It was feared that railways would be used by foreign armies to advance deeper into Chinese territory. The suspicion that Westerners would withhold the best weaponry and sell only outdated equipment to China was also considered. Anti-Western advertisements appeared which detailed the misery of Africa and India under Western rule, and warned that China would be next. The flood of foreign industrial products into China damaged China's economy, and construction of railways led to destitution for the traditional transport workers such as those plying the Grand Canal of China.

Both the conservative and the progressive factions believed in military modernization and adopting military technology from the West, where they differed in was the reform of the political system. Conservatives like Prince Duan, who were xenophobic and disliked foreigners, still adopted Western weaponry and used it to equip their armies. During the Boxer Rebellion, the conservative faction was led by Prince Duan and Dong Fuxiang, who equipped their troops with western rifles and weapons, but made them wear traditional Chinese military uniforms rather than Western-style uniforms.

The conservative faction was led by Empress Dowager Cixi, who became the most powerful political figure in the Qing imperial court after she became the regent for her son, the Tongzhi Emperor, during his years as a minor. Her power and status in the imperial court were further strengthened in 1875 when she became regent for her nephew, the Guangxu Emperor, who ascended the throne after the Tongzhi Emperor's death. The Empress Dowager was adept at manipulating court politics and rivalry to her advantage. She had to accept the reforms of Prince Gong and his supporters initially because of Prince Gong's role in helping her seize power and because of her relative inexperience in political affairs. However, as her own political acumen developed over the years, her support of either faction would depend on the political circumstances. Increasingly, she began to undermine the influence of Prince Gong's faction by supporting conservatives' (Prince Chun, Woren, Li Hongzao) opposition and criticism of reforms. Prince Gong was also temporarily removed from his office several times to undercut his influence. Wenxiang's death in 1876 further weakened the position of Prince Gong. The Empress Dowager's final success was evident from her removal of Prince Gong from power in 1884.

Both the pro- and anti-reform factions strongly advocated for the recentralization of political power in the hands of the Imperial court as a means of bringing a decisive end to the perpetual bickering on the Westernization issue. However, the Imperial Court was not prepared to take direct responsibility for governance due to the presence in court of a large number of incompetent Manchu sinecure holders necessary to shore up Manchu loyalty for the regime. The Imperial court furthermore refused to take any clear stance on the reforms so as to avoid alienating either faction and hence lose key supporters of the regime; Empress Dowager Cixi needed to appease the conservatives due to her flouting of dynastic law in installing the Guangxu emperor as her puppet. Decentralization of government also afforded the Aisin-Gioro family the opportunity to use a strategy of divide and rule to maintain in power, manipulating their subjects against each other. The Imperial court was lethargic and half-hearted in their attempts to rein in regional and provincial finances.

=== Regional issues ===
==== Military ====
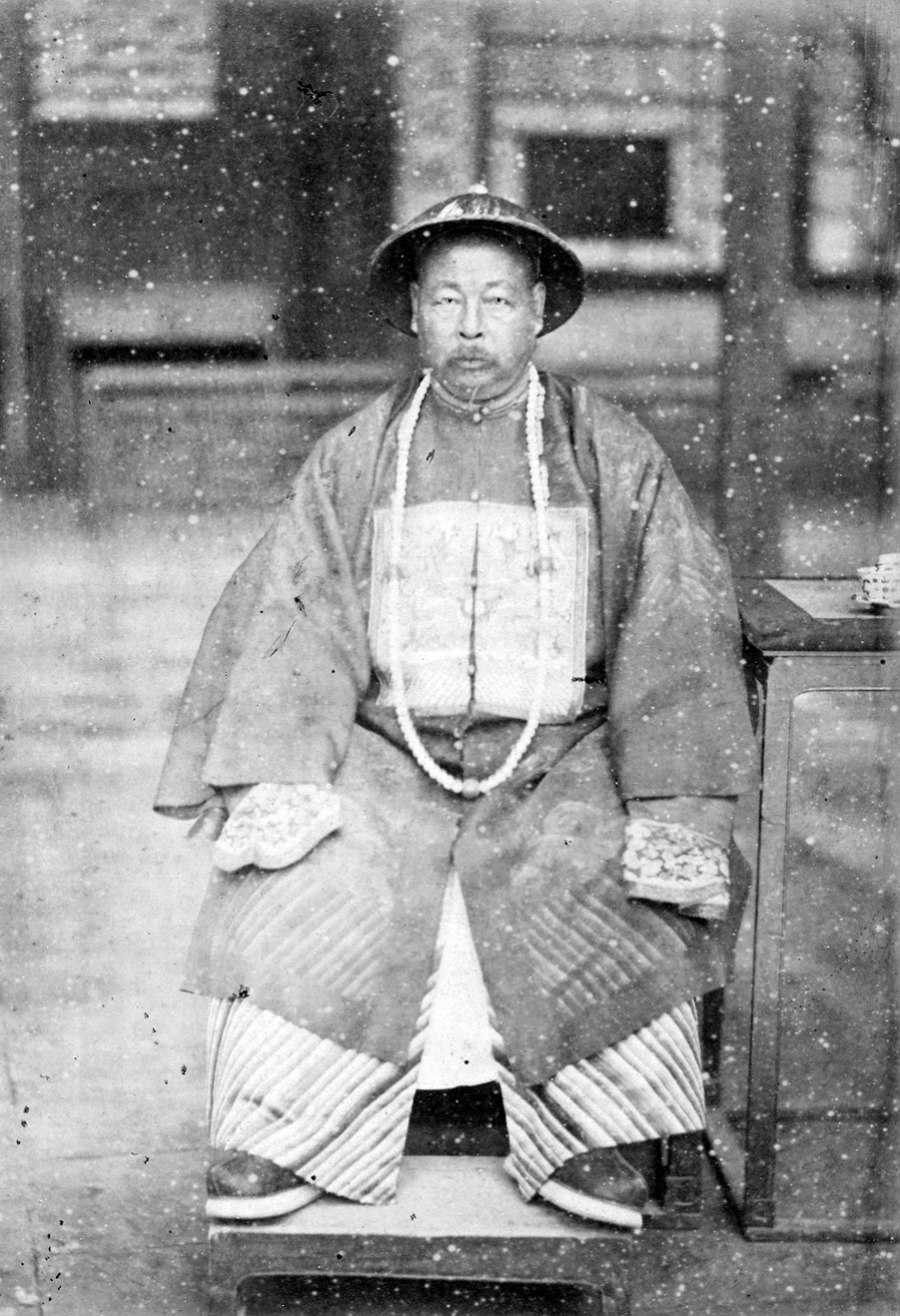
Zuo Zongtang, 1875

Jane E. Elliott criticized the allegation that China refused to modernize or was unable to defeat Western armies as simplistic, noting that China embarked on a massive military modernization in the late 1800s after several defeats, buying weapons from Western countries and manufacturing their own at arsenals, such as the Hanyang Arsenal during the Boxer Rebellion. In addition, Elliott questioned the claim that Chinese society was traumatized by the Western victories, as many Chinese peasants (90% of the population at that time) living outside the concessions continued about their daily lives, uninterrupted and without any feeling of "humiliation".

Historians have judged the Qing dynasty's vulnerability and military weakness in the nineteenth century to be based mainly on its maritime naval weakness while it achieved military success against Western armies on land, the historian Edward L. Dreyer said that "China's nineteenth-century humiliations were strongly related to her weakness and failure at sea. At the start of the Opium War, China had no unified navy and no sense of how vulnerable she was to attack from the sea; British forces sailed and steamed wherever they wanted to go......In the Arrow War (1856–60), the Chinese had no way to prevent the Anglo-French expedition of 1860 from sailing into the Gulf of Zhili and landing as near as possible to Beijing. Meanwhile, new but not exactly modern Chinese armies suppressed the midcentury rebellions, bluffed Russia into a peaceful settlement of disputed frontiers in Central Asia, and defeated the French forces on land in the Sino-French War (1884–85). But the defeat of the fleet, and the resulting threat to steamship traffic to Taiwan, forced China to conclude peace on unfavorable terms."

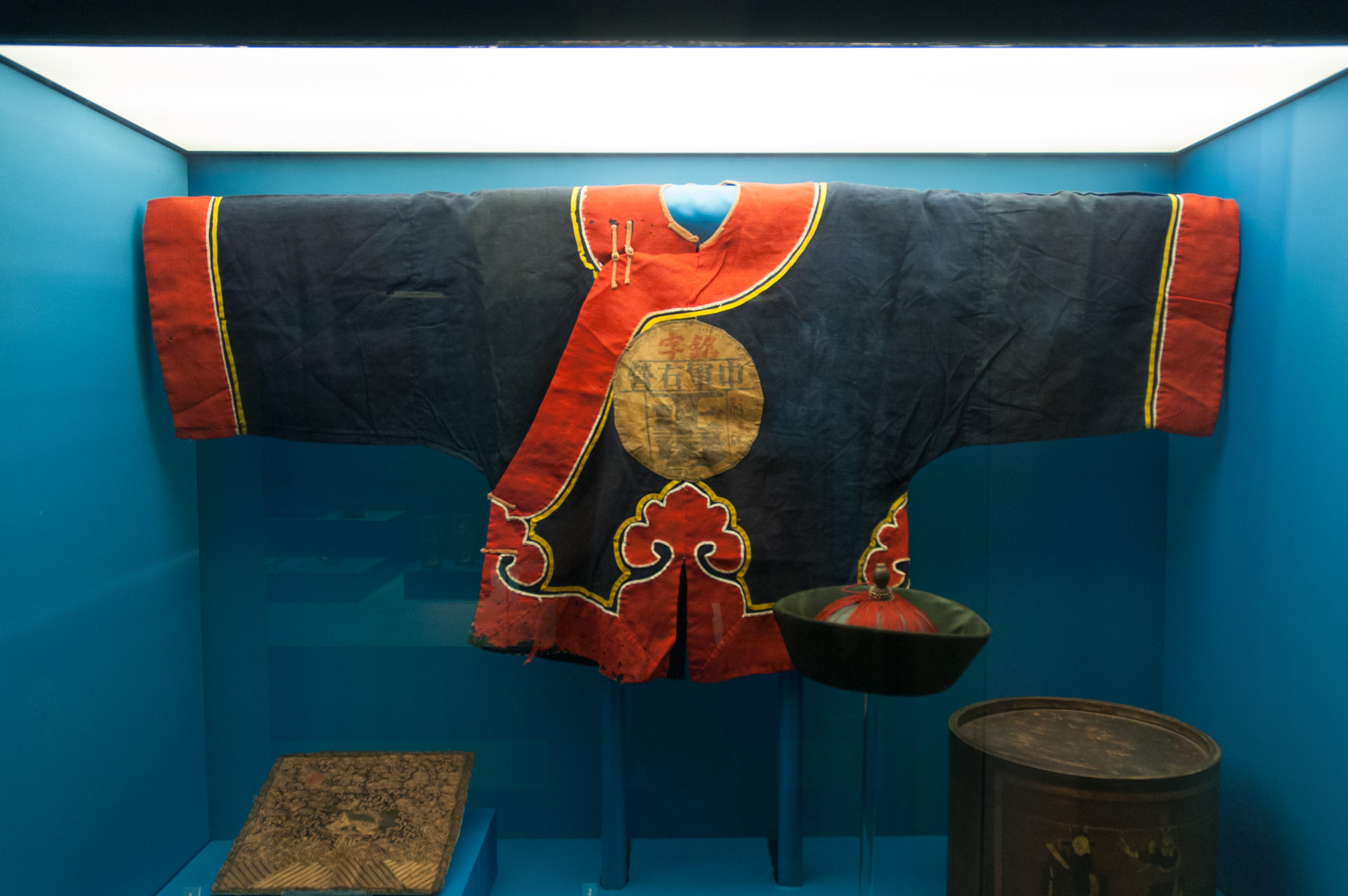
Uniform of a division of the Huai Army

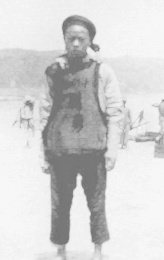
A "Brave" (勇; yǒng). Qing soldiers were distinguished as regulars (兵; bīng) or braves by the characters on their uniforms.

The military defeats suffered by China has been attributed to the factionalism of regional military governors. For instance, the Beiyang Fleet refused to participate in the Sino-French War in 1884, the Nanyang Fleet retaliating by refusing to deploy during the Sino-Japanese War of 1895. Li Hongzhang wanted to personally maintain control of this fleet, many top vessels among its number, by keeping it in northern China and not let it slip into the control of southern factions. China did not have a single admiralty in charge of all the Chinese navies before 1885; the northern and southern Chinese navies did not cooperate, therefore enemy navies needed only to fight a segment of China's navy.

During the later phase of the Taiping Rebellion (1850–64), provincial governors were allowed to raise their own armies, the Yong Ying, to fight against the rebels; many of these forces were not disbanded after the rebellion was over, like Li Hongzhang's Huai Army, or Zuo Zongtang's Chu Army. Franz Michael and Stanley Spector, as well as Lo Erh-kang and P'eng Yü-hsin asserted that these regional political-military organizations undercut central governance.

In the Yong Ying forces, strong bonding, family ties and respectful treatment of troops were emphasized. The officers were never rotated, and the soldiers were handpicked by their commanders, and commanders by their generals, so personal bonds of loyalty formed between officers and the troops, unlike Green Standard and Banner forces. These reforms did not establish a national army; instead, they mobilized regional armies and militias that had neither standardization nor consistency. Officers were loyal to their superiors and formed cliques based upon their place of origins and background.

The officials of the Chu and Huai army cliques were known to band together and were antagonistic toward members of the other group. However, Zeng Guofan did dismantle his forces and Li Hongzhang demobilized half of his forces, demonstrating that they restricted themselves from excessively usurping the power of the court. In addition to regionalism, smaller scale particularist loyalties and autonomy such as provincialism and subdistrict localism also impeded the consolidation of power by regional leaders. The power bases of the regional leaders were similarly diluted through the constant rotation of officials by the Imperial court. As a result, neither the central government nor regional leaders had agency to undertake full-scale modernization. This contrasted with the situation in Japan, where feudal lords independently pioneered the use of new military technology to combat the Shogunate, who were in turn pressed to compete for military technological dominance.

The Confucian disdain for the military was swept aside by the rising necessity of military professionalism, with scholars becoming heavily militarized, and many officers from non-scholarly backgrounds rising to high command and even high office in civil bureaucracy; the military upstaged the civil service. In abject contradiction with Confucian doctrine, they were influenced by German and Japanese ideas of military predominance over the nation, and coupled with the absence of unity amongst the various cliques in the officer class, led to the fragmentation of power in the later Warlord era (1916–1930).

==== Industrialization ====
In the "government-supervised merchant undertakings", the role of supervision was typically not filled by the Imperial government in the capital but instead by regional officials such Li Hongzhang, Governor-General of Zhili, who sponsored the China Merchants' Steam Navigation Company, the Shanghai Cotton Cloth Mill, the Mohe Gold Mines, and others, or Zhang Zhidong, Hubei and Hunan governor-general, over the Hanyang Ironworks, the Daye Iron Mines, and the Pingxiang Coal Mines. Li Hongzhang's influence stemmed from his control of the Huai Army from the Taiping Rebellion onward, his securing of key appointments throughout the empire for his associates, as well as his influence over the finances of the wealthy Yangtze delta provinces. Li moved to acquire enough influence to rival the Imperial court, dominating arms production, maritime customs revenue, and all military forces in the Northern half of the country. Industrial projects were frequently advanced in order to entrench the regional political strongmen, exacerbating the fragmentation of power. Inter-factional struggles to acquire funding for projects was common. After the Taiping rebellion, the balance of power shifted from the central government to regional governors who were able to independently control most of the tax revenue within their respective provinces. Since the foreign import tariffs were enforced by the Western military-backed unequal treaties, and they were largely unable to wrest control of fiscal governance from regional authorities, the Central government in the capital could influence only a very minuscule portion of the fiscal system. This is in stark contrast with the 1873 tax reform in Meiji Japan, where after the unification of Japan in the Boshin War, all land taxes in Japan were standardized and collected by the newly formed Meiji oligarchy central government, which would form the bulk of funding for the new unified Japanese government and its military and industrial projects until the close of the nineteenth century. Chinese tax rates at the time were extremely low. The central government's revenue was less than 3% of the Gross National Product.

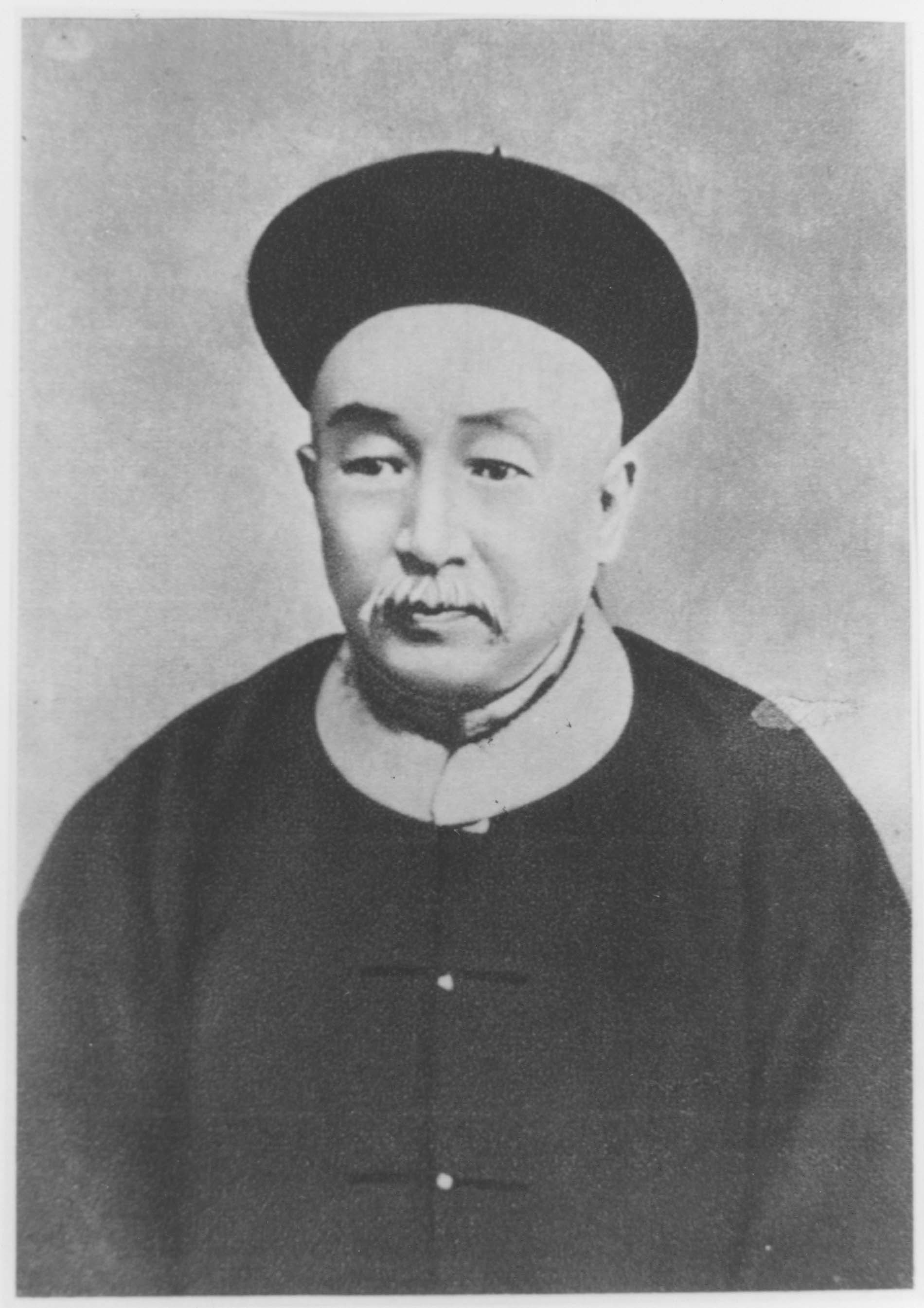
Minister of Transport Sheng Xuanhuai

Kenneth Walker criticized the emphasis placed on cultural conservatism as a factor in delaying the industrialization of China, pointing out that Sheng Xuanhuai and his fellow early industrialists were capable, accomplished businessmen who generated much profit from their operations. He considers them to have merely abided by the principle of increasing risk in calculating liquidity, capital replacement funds, short-term and long-term expectations, while their enterprises remained highly successful commercially. While these early industrialists had political ambitions as scholar-officials, and occasionally spent their funds on disaster relief, it is pointed out that so did the contemporary British factory owners. He postulated that the slow advancement of industrialization was instead primarily due to the modern industrial efforts' size relative to the expanse of China.

Albert Feuerwerker emphasized that these industrial projects were remarkable in the enormous diversity of fields they embarked in, involved in coal and iron mining, steel production, textile manufacture, telegraphy, steamships, railroads and modern banking. In addition, they were profitable enterprises. These, he regards, are especially remarkable in light of the fact that these industrial projects were entirely groundbreaking for China, and yet simultaneously impeded by fierce foreign competition due to imbalanced trade terms of the unequal treaties, shortage of capital and skilled labor, and governmental acquisitiveness. Government interference in these industrial projects aided local comprador merchants to survive and prosper in the face of overwhelming foreign superiority. Feuerwerker remarks that Western powers were more aggressive in establishing factories in China as compared to Japan, using cheap local workers to profit off the Chinese market, siphoning off much of the benefits of industrialization.

=== Production statistics ===
==== Military production ====
The Jiangnan Arsenal produced 65,000 rifles, 742 cannons, 6,700,000 tons of gunpowder, 1,600,000 shells, 8,700,000 bullets, 1,500 land and naval mines, and 15 ships from 1867 to 1895. This was insufficient to arm the standing army of Japan or the Qing bannermen. The Fuzhou arsenal produced 2 cruisers, 12 gunboats, and 14 other warships from 1875 to 1884; 2 warships, 7 cruisers, 6 defense ships, a transport ship and 3 training ships were produced after 1885.

The Hanyang Arsenal in 1891 was rated as being able to produce annually when complete a total of 15,000 rifles, 100 artillery pieces and sufficient ammunition for the weapons produced. In 1901 7 years after the opening of the arsenal annual production was just shy of 11,000 rifles and over 1,825 artillery pieces.

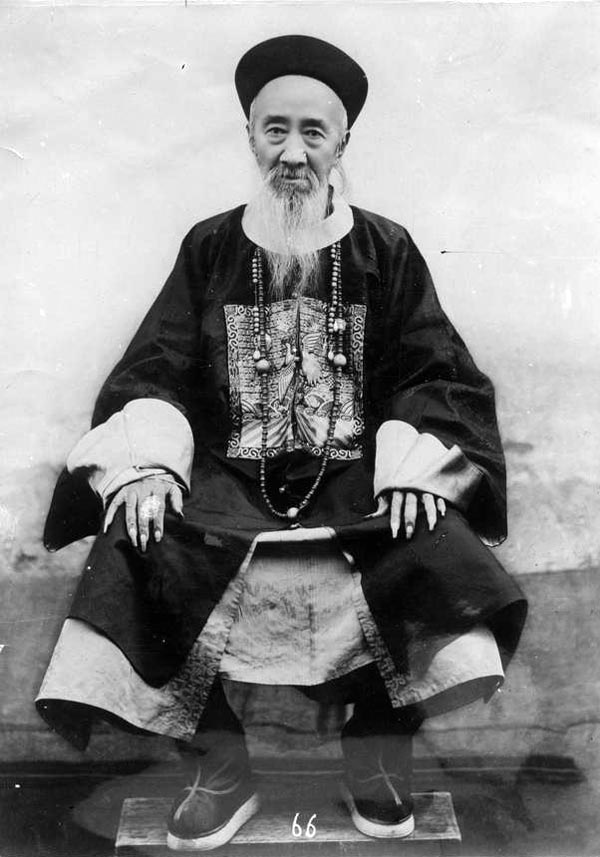
Zhang Zhidong the creator of the Hanyang Arsenal and associated Ironworks.

==== Non-military production ====
From 1867 to 1904 the Jiangnan Arsenal produced 138 lathes, 84 cranes, 117 drilling presses and 77 pumps, additionally the Fuzhou Arsenal produced 66 machine tools and the Sichuan Machine works produced 58 different kinds of machinery just in 1885 totalling over 206 machines in production. The factories howevered suffered from a lack of human capital and financial capital as the Qing government did not invest heavily into the factories.

== List of arsenals in Qing China ==
- Hanyang Arsenal
- Jiangnan Shipyard
- Taiyuan Arsenal
- Lanchow Arsenal (Lanzhou Arsenal) built by the Chu Army
- Foochow Arsenal
- Great Hsi-Ku Arsenal

== List of modernized armies in Qing China ==
- Jiangnan Daying
- Yong Ying
- Xiang Army
- Chu Army
- Huai Army
- Kansu Braves
- Tenacious Army
- Hushenying
- Peking Field Force
- Shenjiying
- Wuwei Corps
- Beiyang Army
- New Army
- Beiyang Fleet
- Fujian Fleet
- Nanyang Fleet
- Shuishiying

== See also ==
- Anson Burlingame
- History of education in China (Qing dynasty)
- Imperial Chinese Navy
- Military of the Qing dynasty
- East-West Cultural Debate
