= Tongwen Guan =

Qing dynasty government school for Western knowledge

- Traditional Chinese: 同文館
- Simplified Chinese: 同文馆
Transcriptions
Standard Mandarin
- Hanyu Pinyin: Tóngwénguǎn
- Wade–Giles: T'ung2-wen2-kuan3

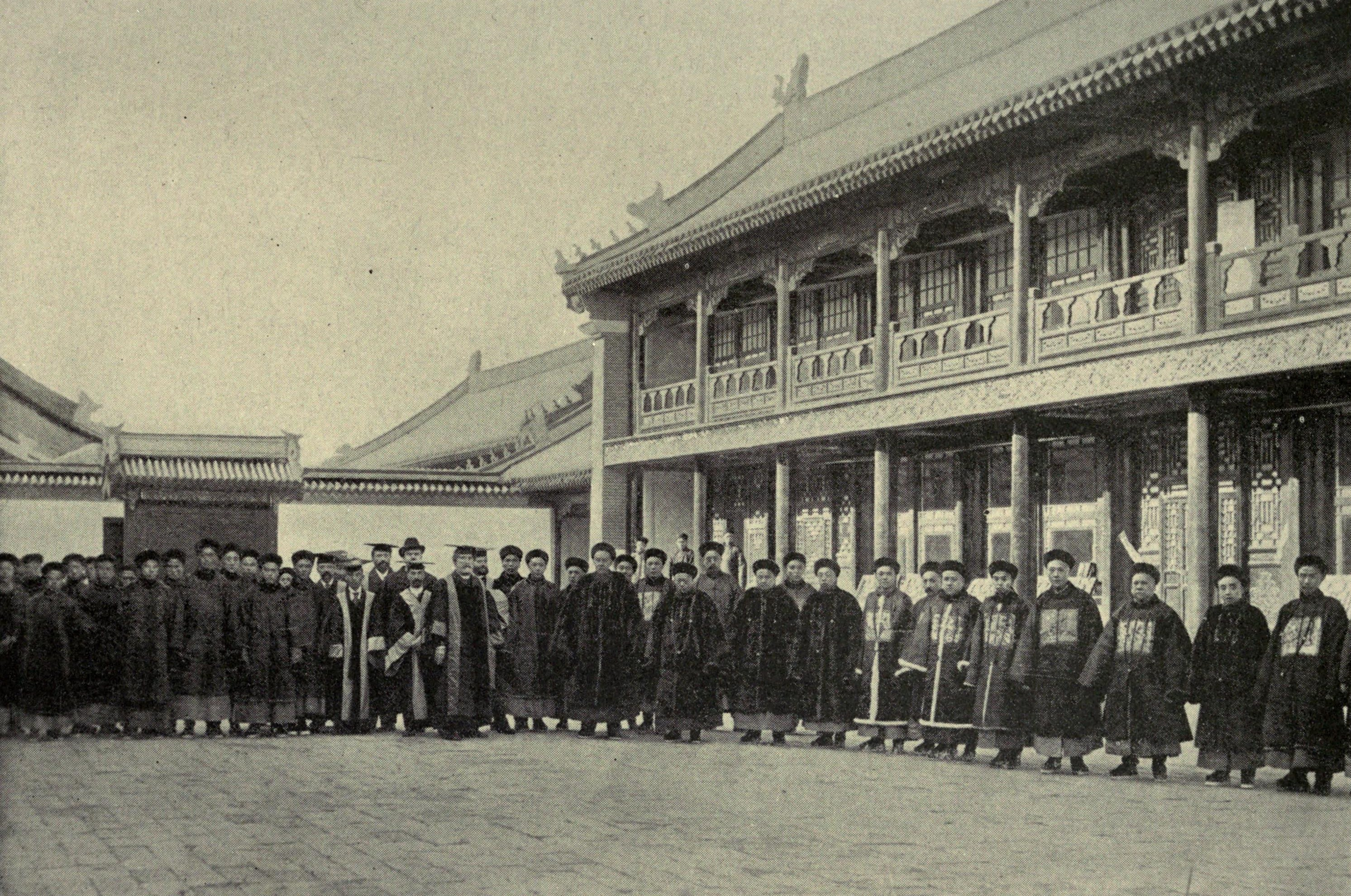
W. A. P. Martin, headmaster, and other faculty members of the Tongwen Guan c.1900.

The School of Combined Learning, or the Tongwen Guan was a government school for teaching Western languages and science, founded at Beijing in 1862, right after the conclusion of the Second Opium War, as part of the Self-Strengthening Movement. Its establishment was intimately linked to the establishment of the Zongli Yamen, the Qing office of foreign affairs.

== Background ==
Small, specialized government foreign language schools have long existed in China since the Ming dynasty. As early as 1407, China had an Office for the Languages of Nations of Four Directions (四夷舘/四夷馆 sì yí guǎn), for the purposes of translating documents from minority and nomadic groups including the Mongols, Jurchens, Hui, and Burmese, who delivered tribute to the court. This office was under the Hanlin Academy, and selected students from the Guozijian. These students were made translation officials after graduating, and were to be re-evaluated every three years in order to stay on or be dismissed. In the Qing dynasty, the Office for the Languages of Nations of Four Directions also had an affiliated Interpreter's Institute (會同舘/会同馆 Huitongguan). Hanlin Academy#Bureau of Translators

The Eluosi Wenguan (俄羅斯文舘 "Russian College") was set up by the Qing dynasty Lifan Yuan in 1708, due to the importance of Russia as a security threat to Qing-dynasty China's north-west border. Its students were selected from the Eight Banners. There were twenty-four students for each grade level, and they were examined every five years. The Russian college was merged into the Tongwen Guan in 1863.

== Establishment and Organization ==
In 1860, Qing China was defeated by Britain and France in the Second Opium War. This event, which led to the invasion of the capital of Beijing and the fleeing of the Xianfeng Emperor to Chengde and his subsequent death, as well as the burning of the grand symbols of imperial glory, the Summer Palace and Old Summer Palace, created an urgent sense of crisis amongst the Chinese elite. A powerful faction of Chinese reformers began to call for political and educational change, calling for the shedding of old educational ways and an increase of dealing with and learning from the West in order to reform and save China. Following the Convention of Peking which concluded the Second Opium War, the Qing Empire created Zongli Yamen, the first Qing office for foreign affairs, in 1861, and one year later, founded the Tongwen Guan to supply the language skills required for the Zongli Yamen.

== History ==
When the college was first started in 1862, it only had ten students and only English instruction under John S. Burdon, a British missionary. By 1866, astronomy and mathematics were added and enrollment was up to the tens. The proposal to add the new departments created a notable dispute between the reformists and the conservatives led by Woren, who opposed adding the new "western" cirriculum for fear of "learning from foreigners". In 1869, Dr. Willian Alexander Parsons Martin, a famed American missionary and translator in China, was appointed the first dean of studies. By 1877, the school had expanded to teach English, French, German, Russian and Japanese, as well as chemistry, medicine, machine-making, astronomy, mathematics, geography and international law, and enrollment was over one hundred.

Similar colleges were later set up at Canton and Shanghai. Tongwen Guan published several influential works introducing Western knowledge into China.

The college's operations were interrupted by war in 1900.

== Legacy ==
The Tongwen Guan became an important founding component of the Imperial University of Peking (now Peking University) after 1902. Its language programs were the direct predecessors for Peking University's various language programs.

== Tongwen Guan staff ==
- John Shaw Burdon (包爾騰) - English (1861-1863) and head instructor (1862-1869)
- William Alexander Parsons Martin (丁韙良) - English (1864-1867) and head instructor (1869-1900)
- John Fryer (傅蘭雅) - English (1863-1864)
- M. J. O'Brien (額布廉/額伯連) - English (1867-1874)
- J. P. Cowles (柯里士) - English (1874-1878)
- Hosea Ballou Morse (馬士) - English (1878-1879)
- Charles Henry Oliver (歐禮斐) - English (1879-1884)
- Anatole Billequin (畢利幹) - chemistry
- "Baron" Johannes von Gumpach (方根拔) - astronomy and mathematics
- Hermann Fritsche (費禮飭) - astronomy (1877-1879)
- Li Shanlan (李善蘭) - mathematics started 1869
