= Wenxiang =

Manchu statesman of the Qing dynasty

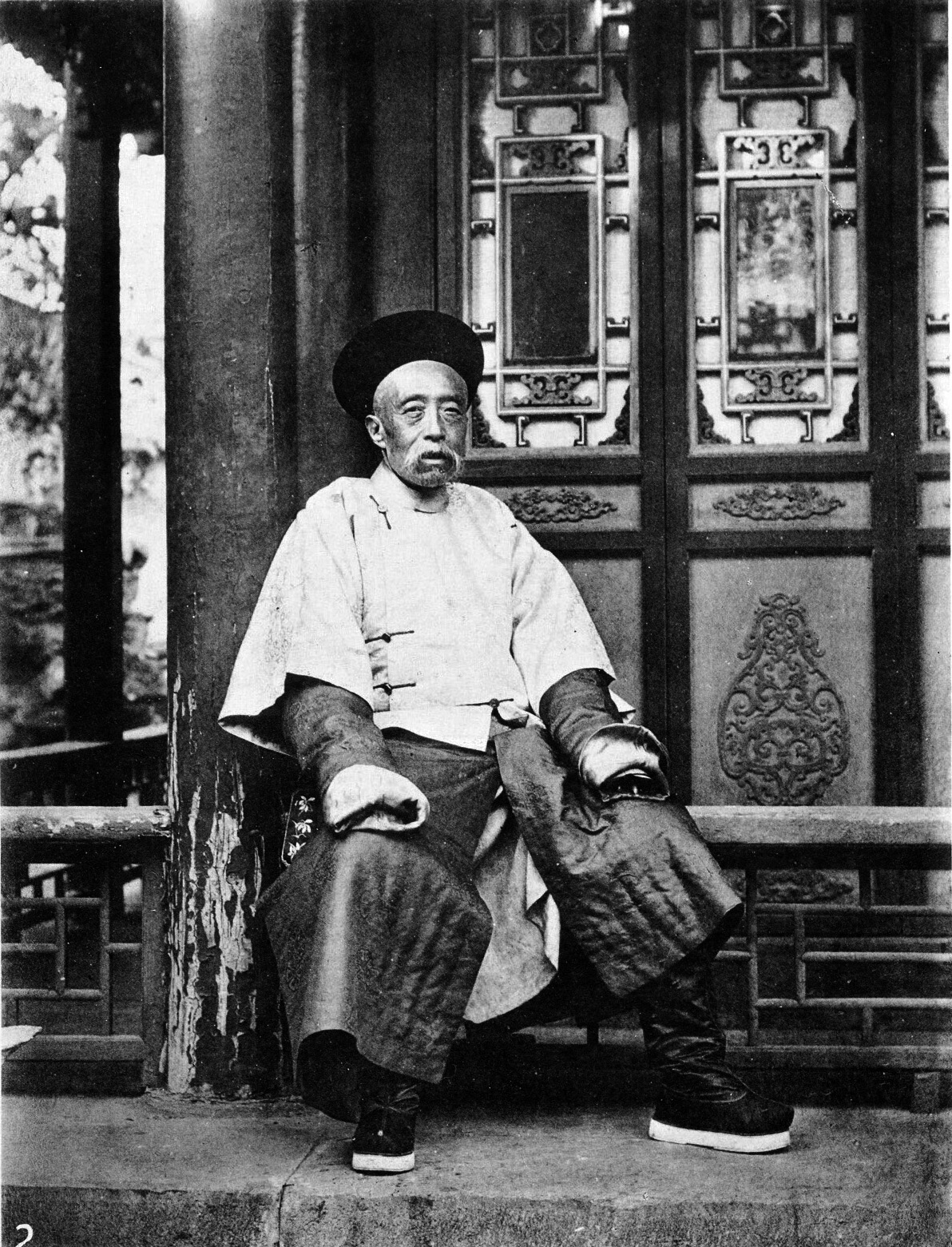

Grand Councilor
- In office 1858–1876

Grand Secretary of the Wuying Hall
- In office 1874–1876

Grand Secretary of the Tiren Library
- In office 1872–1874

Assistant Grand Secretary
- In office 1871–1872

Minister of Personnel
- In office March 31, 1866 – July 16, 1872 Serving with Zhu Fengbiao (until 1868), Shan Maoqian (since 1868)
- Preceded by: Ruichang
- Succeeded by: Baoyun

Minister of Works
- In office October 9, 1862 – March 31, 1866 Serving with Li Han (until 1863), Li Tangjie (1863–1864), Shan Maoqian (since 1864)
- Preceded by: Wesin
- Succeeded by: Ruichang

Minister of Zongli Yamen
- In office January 20, 1861 – May 26, 1876

Personal details
- Born: October 16, 1818 Liaoning, Manchuria, Qing China
- Died: May 26, 1876 (aged 57)
- Education: jinshi degree

Wenxiang (Chinese: 文祥; pinyin: Wénxiáng, Manchu: ᠸᡝᠨᠰᡳᠶᠠᠩ, Möllendorff: Wensiyang, Abkai: Wensiyang), courtesy name Bochuan (博川), art name Zishan (子山), posthumous name Wenzhong (文忠), was an ethnic Manchu statesman of the Qing dynasty of China. Wenxiang hailed from the Gūwalgiya clan and belonged to the Plain Red Banner in the Eight Banners in Mukden. In 1845, he obtained the highest degree (jinshi) in the imperial examination and four years later he was appointed to the Board of Works. He advanced through the ranks and in 1858, he was appointed vice president to the Board of Rites and also became a member of the Grand Council, the highest policy-making organ in the Empire. He subsequently held a number of prominent posts in the central government and became a key player in court politics.

As foreign troops invaded Beijing during the Second Opium War and the Xianfeng Emperor fled to Chengde, Wenxiang remained in the capital and took part in negotiating with the British and French. Following the peace settlement, he became one of the founders of the new Qing foreign office, the Zongli Yamen. He was one of the architects behind the Self-strengthening movement and was instrumental in devising the Qing government's cooperative policy towards the Western powers in the period between 1861 and 1876.
