= Feng Guifen =

Qing Chinese scholar

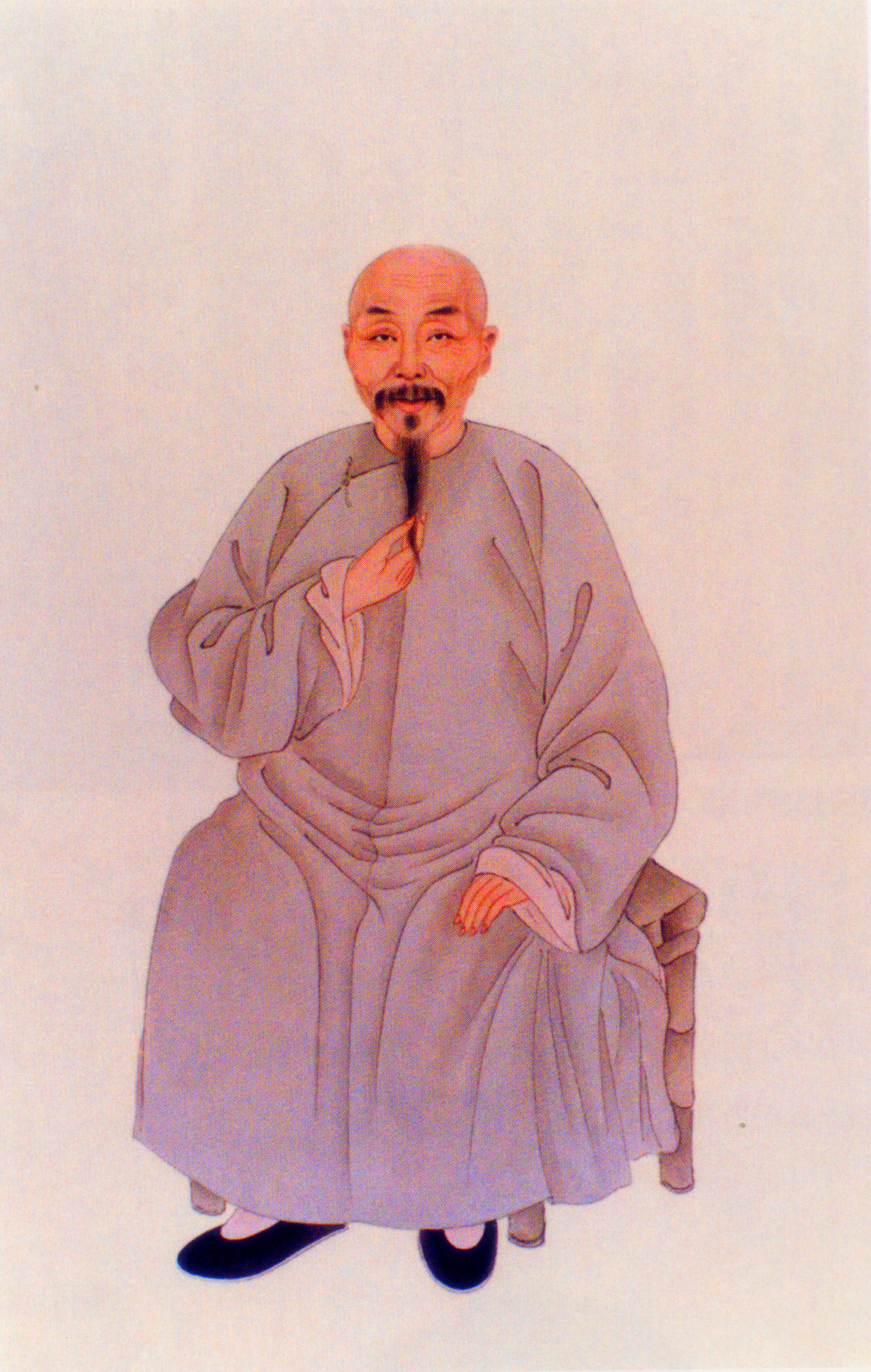

Feng Guifen (Chinese: 馮桂芬; pinyin: Féng Guìfēn; Wade–Giles: Feng^{2} Kuei^{3}-fen^{1}; 1809 – May 28, 1874, courtesy name Linyi (Chinese: 林一; pinyin: Línyī), art name Jingting (Chinese: 景亭; pinyin: Jǐngtíng), later art name Dengweishanren (Chinese: 鄧尉山人; pinyin: Dèngwèishānrén), jinshi degree 1840) was a scholar during the Qing Dynasty. He was also a teacher, and a government official, serving as adviser to leading statesmen of his time. Feng is known for his interest in techniques by which states had become wealthy and strong, highlighting these subjects in the essay he wrote to propose reforms for the Chinese empire. He was the originator of the philosophy of the Self-Strengthening Movement undertaken in the late 19th century.

== Life and career ==
Feng was born to a family of wealthy Suzhou landowners in Wuxian in China's Jainsu Province in 1809. After passing the imperial examination ranking the second, he started working as a compiler at the Hanlin Academy in 1840 and later became the civil service examination supervisor in Guangxi Province. He also served as a private secretary to the Viceroy of Liangjiang, Li Hongzhang.

During the Taiping Rebellion, Feng organized a local militia to fight the rebels. He fled to Shanghai when the rebels occupied Suzhou. Later in his life, Feng became the leader of the jingshi school during the Tongzhi Restoration (1862-1874). He also had an established intellectual relationship with Sun Yat-sen.

== Chinese reform ==
When Feng fled to Shanghai, he came in contact with Westerners who were defending the city. He developed his ideas on modernization based from this interaction. Like other intellectuals and Qing officials such as Wenxiang, Zeng Guofan, and Zuo Zongtang, Feng argued for self-strengthening and industrialization by borrowing western technology and military systems, while retaining core Neo-Confucian principles. After the disasters experienced by China following Wei Yuan's death in 1857, he proposed wide-ranging reforms in a collection of works called Jiaobinlu kangyi or Essays of Protest. In his essay, On The Manufacture of Foreign Weapons, he was famously quoted as saying: "what we have to learn from the barbarians is only the one thing - solid ships and effective guns", though in reality his proposals were a little more extensive.

The essays, which numbered 40 in total, outlined two measures. The first involved the technical improvements in the bureaucracy from the engineering initiatives in the Yellow River to fiscal reform such as the reform of the traditional salt gabelle. The second proposed constitutional changes, particularly the reallocation of political power and status. Although many of his reforms were never fully enacted, they were circulated for later generations of political reformers. It is also considered one of the earliest reformist agenda of modern China and would contribute to the Hundred Days Reform of 1898. His ideas also became the basis for the Self-Strengthening Movement that emerged in 1861 and lasted until 1895.
