= Guizhou Ironworks =

Guizhou Ironworks were established in 1891 as part of the third phase of the Self Strengthening Movement in the Qing dynasty.
