= Ministry of Posts and Communications =

Qing dynasty government ministry

- 郵傳部
- Seal of Qing dynasty

Agency overview
- Formed: 1906
- Preceding agency: Imperial Telegraph Administration
- Dissolved: 1912
- Superseding agency: Ministry of Transport, Republic of China
- Jurisdiction: Late Qing dynasty China

The Ministry of Posts and Communications or Youchuanbu (Chinese: 郵傳部; pinyin: Yóuchuánbù) was a late Qing dynasty ministry responsible for mail and telecommunications and for the Chinese rail network.

It was established in 1906 through the unification of the Imperial Railroad of North China and other railroads with the postal administration and the recently nationalized Imperial Chinese Telegraph Administration.

In 1908, it founded the Bank of Communications to redeem the Beijing–Hankou Railway from its Belgian concessionaires. The bank was also intended to unify funding for steamship lines, railways, and telegraph and postal facilities. After the establishment of the Central Bank of China in 1928, the Bank of Communications was used to fund general industrial development.

After the 1911 revolution gave its name to the Communications Clique during the Warlord Era.

== See also ==
- History of rail transport in China
- Postage stamps and postal history of China
- National Railway Administration (China)
- Taiwan Railways Administration
- Ministry of Post and Telecommunications (China)
- Ministry of Transport (China)
- Ministry of Transportation and Communications (Taiwan)
