= Imperial Chinese Telegraph Administration =

Qing dynasty corporation founded in 1881

Imperial Telegraph Administration
- Seal of Qing dynasty

Agency overview
- Formed: 1881
- Dissolved: 1906
- Superseding agency: Ministry of Posts and Communications
- Jurisdiction: Qing Empire (China)

The Imperial Telegraph Administration (ITA; Chinese: 電政總局) or Imperial Chinese Telegraph Administration (ICTA) was a Qing-era government-controlled corporation (spec. guandu shangban) supervised by Sheng Xuanhuai.

The ITA was established in 1881, after which it swiftly gained a monopoly on Chinese telegraphy. The Qing government's control over the agency would prove to be crucial in its efforts to centralize power.

By 1900 the ITA administered 14,000 miles of telegraph wires and supervised another 20,000 miles under local control. The same year, it absorbed the infant Chinese telephone network started in Nanjing.

The ITA was nationalized in 1902 to allow for the expansion of the network despite otherwise unprofitable usage rates. The ITA was then absorbed by the newly formed Ministry of Posts and Communications in 1906. Following nationalization, control alternated between Sheng and his political rival Tang Shaoyi.

== Telegraphy and Centralization ==
The introduction of the telegraph to Imperial China fundamentally changed the systems of government that held together the Qing state. Prior to the telegraph, central government officials handed down edicts, by way of bureaucratic newsletters such as the Peking Gazette, but these legislations were carried out almost entirely by local officials with little oversight. These newsletters allowed the Qing, and the Ming Dynasty before them, some agency in controlling the spread of information across the vast areas the ruled, but they were effectively a one way channel of communication. The telegraph allowed Qing officials to coordinate and control, by way of direct and near instantaneous communication, the machinery of state on all its levels.

Seeing the value of this new technology, the Qing folded the ITA into the national agency Youchuanbu (Chinese: 郵伝部), The Ministry of Posts and Communications, in 1906. The Ministry of Posts and Communications then dictated that all communications administrations such as post offices, customs offices, and local telegraph offices, which had up until this point been managed by provincial authorities, be overseen by the Ministry of Posts and Communications. Instantaneous communication began to fold space and time together in such a way that only a handful of bureaucrats in a central location could micromanage the day to day of provincial and national affairs. On the global stage as well as within China proper, these centralizing developments collapsed time and space to the point where individuals could buy and sell the idea of goods rather than the goods themselves in the new global market. The telegraph allowed for and facilitated these changes to China's machinery of state that would change the relationship between the local and national government, and setting a precedent of centralization that would continue through to the People's Republic of China in the present day, increasing with every subsequent innovation in communications technology.

After the 1911 Revolution and the reformation of the Qing Empire into The Republic of China, the ITA remained a facet of the Ministry of Posts and Communications, the newly renamed Ministry of Communications. Prior to 1911, there was on going debate within China about the Qing's decision to nationalize all of the industries that made up the Ministry of Communications, which would serve as fuel on the revolutionary fire. The ITA would remain a nationalized entity under the Ministry of Communications which would give name to the influential Communications Clique during the Warlord Era.

== Nationalizing and Democratizing Effects ==
While the Qing's efforts to centralize by expanding and controlling telegraphy would eventually resolve into the extremely centralized People's Republic of China, telegraphy in the short term proved to have both an nationalizing and democratizing effect. Telegraphy transcended geography in such a way that allowed people to see the whole of humanity more so than any communication medium before it, and resulted in the novel concepts of governance that pervaded the 20th century such as nationalism and communism. The ability to communicate with far away people and swiftly learn about events on the other side of the globe has fostered both unity and alienation in the international community.

In China, as the Qing attempted to tighten their control over networks of communication, local telegraph magnates like Jing Yuanshan the head of the Shanghai Telegraph Administration found ways to utilize the burgeoning technology to counter state power. After an edict issued by Empress Dowager Cixi in 1900 in which she attempted to position a puppet imperial family member as an heir to the recently deceased Emperor Guangxu, Jing sent a protest telegram to the Zongli Yamen, the Qing's foreign policy agency, cosigned by 1,231 of Shanghai's powerful.

== See also ==
- Qing dynasty
- Self-Strengthening Movement
- Hundred Days' Reform
- Telecommunications in the People's Republic of China
