= Johannes Von Gumpach =

Johannes von Gumpach (Chinese: 方根拔) (1814–1875) was a German-born Englishman who was hired in China to teach astronomy and mathematics.

Von Gumpach was born in Fedderwarden nearby Wilhelmshaven on 7 May 1814 as Johannes Grumbrecht. By 1841 he was recorded as living in the parish of St James, Clerkenwell, in London. In England he adopted the first name Theodor, and in October 1842 he married Jane Willbraham Edwards in Cheltenham, Gloucester, England. While in the employ of the bank Huth & Co he was arrested for embezzlement and sentenced to seven years' exile. He and his wife arrived in Nuremberg on 5 September 1844 using the assumed name "Baron" Johannes von Gumpach. In 1860 he was living in Munich, and from 1860 to 1865 lived in Guernsey in the British Channel Islands, where he wrote copiously to the British astronomical establishment claiming that Newton's "erring imagination" and the acceptance that the Earth was oblate was the cause of maritime disasters. He published scientific writings as a "private scholar".

He was hired by the Tongwen Guan (School of Combined Learning) of the Chinese imperial government, the first modern institution of higher education in China. His dismissal by Robert Hart led him to sue Hart in the British Supreme Court for China and Japan for defamation. In 1873, the case ultimately went to the Judicial Committee of the Privy Council Hart v Gumpach which upheld Hart's right to make the decision.

In his career, he had written a number of books about the social and economical issues of China.

Von Gumpach died in July 1875 at the General Hospital in Shanghai.

== Publications ==
- Practical tables for the reduction of Mahometan dates to the Christian calendar. 1856.
- A Popular Inquiry Into the Moon's Rotation on Her Axis. 1856.
- A million's worth of property, and five hundred lives lost annually at sea by the theory of gravitation. 1861.
- The True Figure and Dimensions of the Earth ... in a Letter Addressed to George Biddell Airy and others. 1862.
- On the Historical Antiquity of the People of Egypt: their Vulgar Kalendar, and the Epoch of its Introduction. 1863.
- Baby-worlds: An essay on the nascent members of our solar household. With an appendix, containing various papers and dissertations, astronomical, meteorological and chronological. 1863.
- The Treaty-Rights of the Foreign Merchant, and the Transit-System, in China. 1866.
- Time, Space and Eternity. An essay. 1866.
- The Burlingame Mission: A Political Disclosure, Supported by Official Documents, Mostly Unpublished. To which are Added: Various Papers and Discourses on the Claim of the Emperor of China to Universal Supremacy; the True Nature of Actual Diplomatic Relations Between China and Western Powers; the Position and Influence in China of Robert Hart, Esq., as Confidential Adviser of the Tsung-li Yamen; the Hart-Alcock Convention; the Dispersion of the Lay-Osborn Flotilla; the "New Chinese University"; the Policy of the United States in China; the New China Policy of England; the Western Policy, and the Diplomacy of the Chinese Government; the Massacre of Tien-tsin; the Chung-'ho Mission; the Audience Question; and the Coming War. 1872.
- The Tonnage-Dues Fund, the Harbour of Shanghai and the Wu-sung Bar. 1872.
- The Returns of Trade at the Treaty Ports in China. 1875.

In German:

- On the old Jewish calendar. 1848.
- The chronology of the Babylonians and Assyrians. 1852.
- Old Testament studies. 1852.
- Help book for calculating chronology; Largeteau's abbreviated solar and moon charts, for astronomers' and chronologists' manual use. 1853.
- Demolition of Babylonian-Assyrian history. 1854.
- The Prophet Habakkuk. 1860.
