= Woren =

Imperial tutor Wesin

Grand Secretary of the Wenhua Hall
- In office 7 May – 8 June 1871

Grand Secretary of the Wenyuan Library
- In office 22 October 1862 – 7 May 1871

Assistant Grand Secretary
- In office 6 August – 9 October 1862

Minister of Zongli Yamen
- In office 25 April – 13 July 1867

Minister of Works
- In office 14 February – 9 October 1862 Serving with Wang Qingyun (until 16 April), Li Han (since 16 April)
- Preceded by: Airen
- Succeeded by: Wenxiang

Deputy Minister of Revenue of Mukden
- In office 23 December 1857 – 3 November 1861
- Preceded by: Funiyagangga
- Succeeded by: Herun

Deputy Minister of Rites of Mukden
- In office 10 September 1856 – 23 December 1857
- Preceded by: Heseben
- Succeeded by: Wenjun

Personal details
- Born: 1804 Kaifeng, Henan, Qing China
- Died: June 8, 1871 (aged 66–67)
- Education: Jinshi degree in the Imperial Examination
- Occupation: politician, philosopher
- Clan name: Ucigeri (烏齊格里)
- Courtesy name: Genfeng (艮峰)
- Posthumous name: Wenduan (文端)

Military service
- Allegiance: Qing dynasty
- Branch/service: Mongolian Plain Red Banner

Woren (Chinese: 倭仁; pinyin: Wōrén), alternatively rendered as Wesin (Manchu: ᠸᡝᠰᡳᠨ, romanized: wesin; 1804 – 8 June 1871), courtesy name Genfeng (艮峰), posthumous name Wenduan (文端), was an official of China's Qing dynasty. He was from the Mongol Ucigeri clan and belonged to the Plain Red Banner of the Eight Banners.

Born in a banner garrison family in Henan, Woren obtained the highest degree (jinshi) in the imperial examination and was selected a shujishi of the Hanlin Academy in 1829. He served as tutor of the Tongzhi Emperor.

Woren was a famous opponent of the Self-Strengthening Movement. He rejected the ti-yong idea.
