= Enfield rifle (disambiguation) =

Enfield rifle may refer to several different weapons, listed below in order of their introduction. Following each are the production start date and bullet or round used.

- Enfield Needlefire, 1851, an experimental rifle based on Dreyse's Zündnadelgewehr
- Pattern 1853, 1853, .577 calibre Minié-type muzzle-loading rifle-musket
- Snider–Enfield, 1866, .577 Snider / .577/450 Martini–Henry, initially a modification of the Pattern 1853
- Martini–Enfield, 1878, .303 British
- Lee–Enfield, 1895, .303 British (a version of the Lee-Metford using smokeless powder)
- Pattern 1913 Enfield, 1913, .276 Enfield
- Pattern 1914 Enfield, 1914, .303 British
- M1917 Enfield, 1917, .30-06 Springfield, the "American Enfield"
- EM-2 rifle, 1950 Experimental British Assault Rifle .280 British
- Enfield Individual Weapon (EIW), a 5.56mm rifle that was the basis of the SA80 family of weapons. As the L85 it replaced the L1A1 Self-Loading Rifle as the standard British rifle. The SA80 was the last weapon to come from the Royal Small Arms Factory at Enfield Lock. Production switched in 1988 to the Royal Ordnance's Nottingham Small Arms Facility. The current L85A2 version is produced by Heckler und Koch.
