= Imperial examination =

Civil service examination system in Imperial China

- Imperial examination candidates gathering around the wall where results were posted, an announcement known as 'releasing the roll' (放榜; fàngbǎng) – by Qiu Ying (c. 1540)

Chinese name
- Traditional Chinese: 科舉
- Simplified Chinese: 科举
- Hanyu Pinyin: kējǔ
- Literal meaning: subject recommendation
Transcriptions
Standard Mandarin
- Hanyu Pinyin: kējǔ
- Wade–Giles: k'o^{1}-chü^{3}
- Yale Romanization: kē-jyǔ
- IPA: [kʰɤ́.tɕỳ]
Wu
- Suzhounese: khou^{1}-ciu^{3}
Yue: Cantonese
- Yale Romanization: fōgéui
- Jyutping: fo1-geoi2
- IPA: [fɔ˥kɵɥ˧˥]
Southern Min
- Tâi-lô: kho-kú

Vietnamese name
- Vietnamese alphabet: khoa cử
- Chữ Hán: 科舉

Korean name
- Hangul: 과거
- Hanja: 科擧
Transcriptions
- Revised Romanization: gwageo
- McCune–Reischauer: kwagŏ

Japanese name
- Kyūjitai: 科擧
- Shinjitai: 科挙
Transcriptions
- Romanization: kakyo

Manchu name
- Manchu script: ᡤᡳᡡ ᡰ᠊ᡳᠨ ᠰᡳᠮᠨᡝᡵᡝ
- Möllendorff: giū žin simnere

The imperial examination (Chinese: 科舉) was a civil service examination system in Imperial China administered for the purpose of selecting candidates for the state bureaucracy. The concept of choosing bureaucrats by merit rather than by birth started early in Chinese history, and the first earnest use of written examinations as a method of recruitment appeared under the Sui dynasty (581–618). Its systematic implementation began during the Tang dynasty (618–907), when examinations became a regular channel for bureaucratic appointment and the dominant path to high office. It was further expanded during the Song dynasty (960–1279). The system lasted for 1,300 years until its abolition during the late Qing dynasty reforms in 1905. The key sponsors for abolition were Yuan Shikai, Yinchang, and Zhang Zhidong. Aspects of the imperial examination still exist for entry into the civil service of both China and Taiwan.

The exams served to ensure a common knowledge of writing, Chinese classics, and literary style among state officials. This common culture helped to unify the empire, and the ideal of achievement by merit gave legitimacy to imperial rule. The examination system played a significant role in tempering the power of hereditary aristocracy and military authority, and in the rise of a gentry class of scholar-bureaucrats.

Starting with the Song dynasty, the imperial examination system became a more formal system and developed into a roughly three-tiered ladder from local to provincial to court exams. During the Ming dynasty (1368–1644), authorities narrowed the content down to mostly texts on Neo-Confucian orthodoxy; the highest degree, the jinshi, became essential for the highest offices. On the other hand, holders of the basic degree, the shengyuan, became vastly oversupplied, resulting in holders who could not hope for office. During the 19th century, the wealthy could opt into the system by educating their sons or by purchasing an office. In the late 19th century, some critics within Qing China blamed the examination system for stifling scientific and technical knowledge, and urged for reforms. At the time, China had about one civil licentiate per 1,000 people. Due to the stringent requirements, there was only a 1% passing rate among the two or three million annual applicants who took the exams.

The Chinese examination system has had a profound influence in the development of modern civil service administrative functions in other countries. These include analogous structures that have existed in Japan, Korea, the Ryukyu Kingdom, and Vietnam. In addition to Asia, reports by European missionaries and diplomats introduced the Chinese examination system to the Western world and encouraged France, Germany and the British East India Company (EIC) to use similar methods to select prospective employees. Seeing its initial success within the EIC, the British government adopted a similar testing system for screening civil servants across the board throughout the United Kingdom in 1855. The United States would also establish such programs for certain government jobs after 1883.

== General history ==
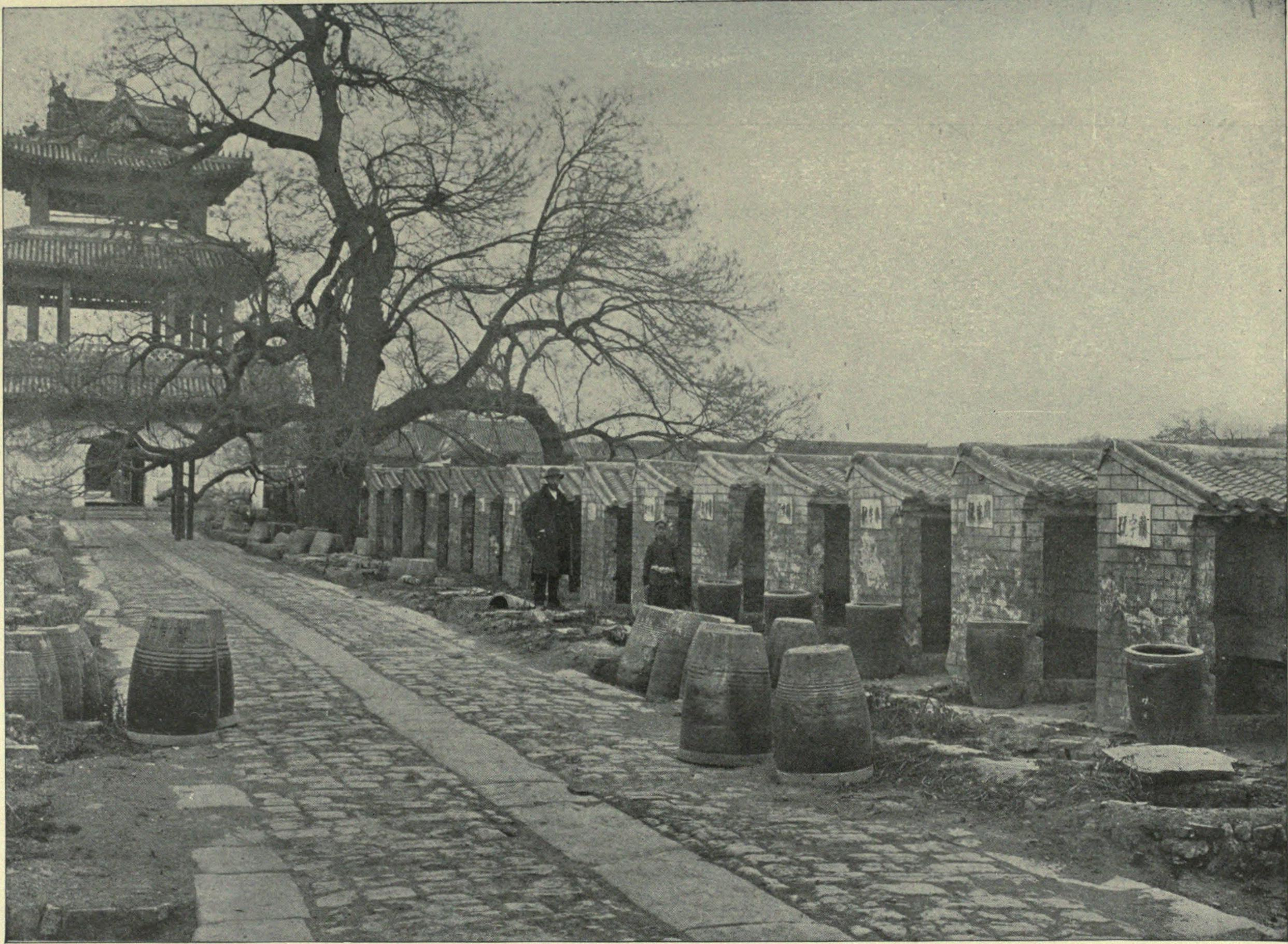
Examination cells, Beijing

Tests of skill such as archery contests have existed since the Zhou dynasty (or, more mythologically, Yao). The Confucian characteristic of the later imperial exams was largely due to the reign of Emperor Wu of Han during the Han dynasty. Although some examinations did exist from the Han to the Sui dynasty, they did not offer an official avenue to government appointment, the majority of which were filled through recommendations based on qualities such as social status, morals, and ability.

The bureaucratic imperial examinations as a concept have their origins in the year 605 during the short-lived Sui dynasty. Its successor, the Tang dynasty, implemented imperial examinations on a relatively small scale until the examination system was extensively expanded during the reign of Wu Zetian, ruler of Wu Zhou. Included in the expanded examination system was a military exam, but the military exam never had a significant impact on the Chinese officer corps and military degrees were seen as inferior to their civil counterpart. The exact nature of Wu's influence on the examination system is still a matter of scholarly debate.

During the Song dynasty the emperors expanded both examinations and the government school system, in part to counter the influence of military aristocrats, increasing the number of degree holders to more than four to five times that of the Tang. From the Song dynasty onward, the examinations played the primary role in selecting scholar-officials, who formed the literati elite of society. However the examinations co-existed with other forms of recruitment such as direct appointments for the ruling family, nominations, quotas, clerical promotions, sale of official titles, and special procedures for eunuchs. The regular higher level degree examination cycle was decreed in 1067 to be three years but this triennial cycle only existed in nominal terms. In practice both before and after this, the examinations were irregularly implemented for significant periods of time: thus, the calculated statistical averages for the number of degrees conferred annually should be understood in this context. The jinshi exams were not a yearly event and should not be considered so; the annual average figures are a necessary artifact of quantitative analysis. The operations of the examination system were part of the imperial record keeping system, and the date of receiving the jinshi degree is often a key biographical datum: sometimes the date of achieving jinshi is the only firm date known for even some of the most historically prominent persons in Chinese history.

A brief interruption to the examinations occurred at the beginning of the Yuan dynasty in the 13th century, but was later brought back with regional quotas which favored the Mongols and disadvantaged Southern Chinese. During the Ming and Qing dynasties, the system contributed to the narrow and focused nature of intellectual life and enhanced the autocratic power of the emperor. The system continued with some modifications until its abolition in 1905 during the late Qing reforms in the last years of the Qing dynasty. The modern examination system for selecting civil servants also indirectly evolved from the imperial one.

Jinshi graduates by dynasty
Dynasty	Exams held	Jinshi graduates
Tang (618–907)		6,585
Song (960–1279)	118	38,517
Yuan (1271–1368)	16	1,136
Ming (1368–1644)	89	24,536
Qing (1644–1912)	112	26,622

== Precursors ==
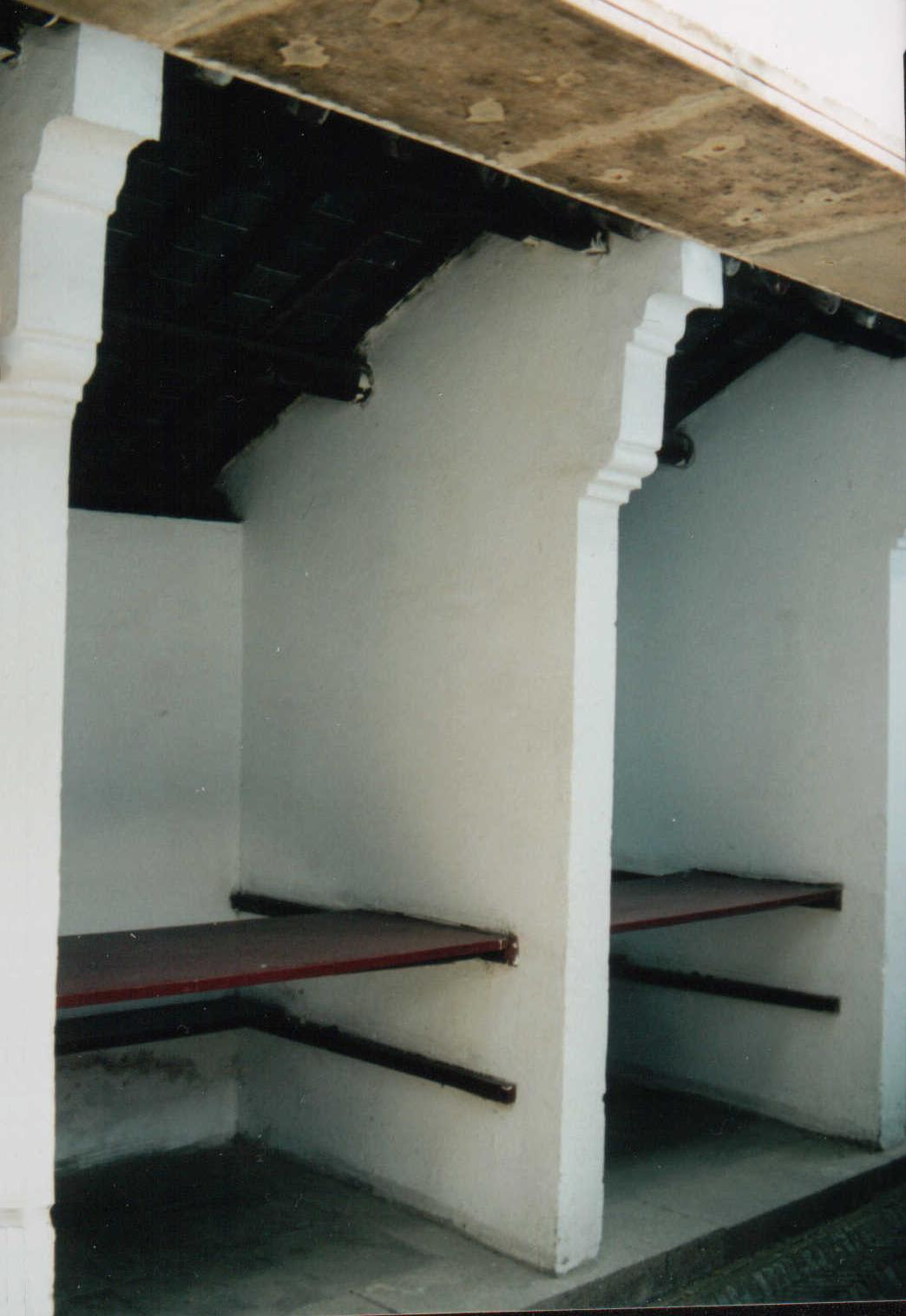
Chinese Examination Cells at the South River School (Nanjiangxue) Nanjing (China)

=== Han dynasty ===
In the early Han dynasty, the paths to officialdom were initially monopolised by the higher aristocrats. For instance, officials of ranks 2,000 dan and above were permitted to recommend their sons and relatives into the court as attendants/Court gentlemen.

In 165 BC, Emperor Wen of Han introduced recruitment to the civil service through examinations. Previously, potential officials never sat for any sort of academic examinations. However, these examinations did not heavily emphasize Confucian material. Emperor Wu of Han's early reign saw the creation of a series of posts for academicians in 136 BC. Ardently promoted by Dong Zhongshu, the Taixue and Imperial examination came into existence by recommendation of Gongsun Hong, chancellor under Wu. Officials would select candidates to take part in an examination of the Confucian classics, from which Emperor Wu would select officials to serve by his side.

Gongsun intended for the Taixue's graduates to become imperial officials but they usually only started off as clerks and attendants, and mastery of only one canonical text was required upon its founding, changing to all five in the Eastern Han. Starting with only 50 students, Emperor Zhao expanded it to 100, Emperor Xuan to 200, and Emperor Yuan to 1,000. The top graduates (Grade A, 甲科) of the Taixue were immediately admitted as Court gentlemen, while the Grade B (乙科) graduates were sent to serve probationary positions in their local commanderies. The Taixue thereby began to dilute the aristocratic backgrounds of the Court gentlemen, increasing the access of commoner scholars to official appointments. After the reign of Emperor Wu, the numbers of Court gentlemen swelled by over two hundred every year; of this number, more than half were graduates from the Taixue, increasing the proportion of non-aristocratic scholars in government.

Emperor Wu introduced a regularised system of recommendations known as Xiaolian (Filially Pious and Incorrupt) in which each local magistrate or governor had to recommend at least one candidate to the court every year. Later, the recommendation quota would be set at one candidate for each 200,000 households. Candidates for offices recommended by the prefect of a prefecture were examined by the Ministry of Rites and then presented to the emperor. Some candidates for clerical positions would be given a test to determine whether they could memorize nine thousand Chinese characters. The "proper path" (正途) to official positions, which rapidly crowded out all other forms of entry, was to graduate from the Taixue, serve a probationary post in one's local commandery, and then gain a recommendation from the local official to undergo the final civil service examinations. As a result, the Han system of official selection combined education, administrative exposure, recommendation and examinations in their procedure. In 132 AD, examinations were instituted to test all Xiaolian candidates recommended to the court.

The system relied heavily on families who had access to education; before the proliferation of paper and printing, books were made of expensive or unwieldy bamboo and silk. The costs of literacy meant that relatively few could afford to become sufficiently educated for government service. Furthermore, the system of recommendations allowed high-level (2,000-dan) officials to induct their family members into the government, and whenever they served as a Commandery governor they could also recommend new candidates who would be beholden to them, and were expected to repay the favour by recommending their other relatives. The kin of higher officials therefore had better chances of gaining positions.

Towards the end of the Han, there were increasing pressures to reform the system of recommendations, which had become monopolised by elites based on their claims of moral superiority, and the role of making recommendations had shifted from local officials to retired officials, producing a number of unqualified nominees.

=== Three Kingdoms ===
The first standardized method of recruitment in Chinese history was introduced during the Three Kingdoms period in the Kingdom of Wei. It was called the nine-rank system. In the nine-rank system, each office was given a rank from highest to lowest in descending order from one to nine. Imperial officials were responsible for assessing the quality of the talents recommended by local elites. The system was ostensibly based on a few criteria: moral probity, administrative ability, and the contributions of the person or his family to the newly created Cao Wei regime. In practice, descent also played an important role, as the service grade of a candidate's father had a bearing on their candidacy grade. Since the criteria for recruitment included qualities such as morals and social status, this in practice meant that influential families monopolized all high-ranking posts while men of poorer means filled the lower ranks.

The local zhongzheng (lit. central and impartial) officials assessed the status of households or families in nine categories; only the sons of the fifth categories and above were entitled to offices. The method obviously contradicted the ideal of meritocracy. It was, however, convenient in a time of constant wars among the various contending states, all of them relying on an aristocratic political and social structure. For nearly three hundred years, noble young men were afforded government higher education in the Imperial Academy and carefully prepared for public service. The Jiupin guanren fa was closely related to this kind of educational practice and only began to decline after the second half of the sixth century.

— Thomas H. C. Lee

While the nine-rank system helped powerful clans to dominate official posts in the court, it also helped stimulate private schooling within families as a means of transmitting knowledge that could increase one's standing as someone eligible for evaluation. After the nine rank system was introduced for grading bureaucrats, the Guozijian (Imperial Academy) was created for persons rank five and above, effectively making it the educational institution for nobles.

== History by dynasty ==
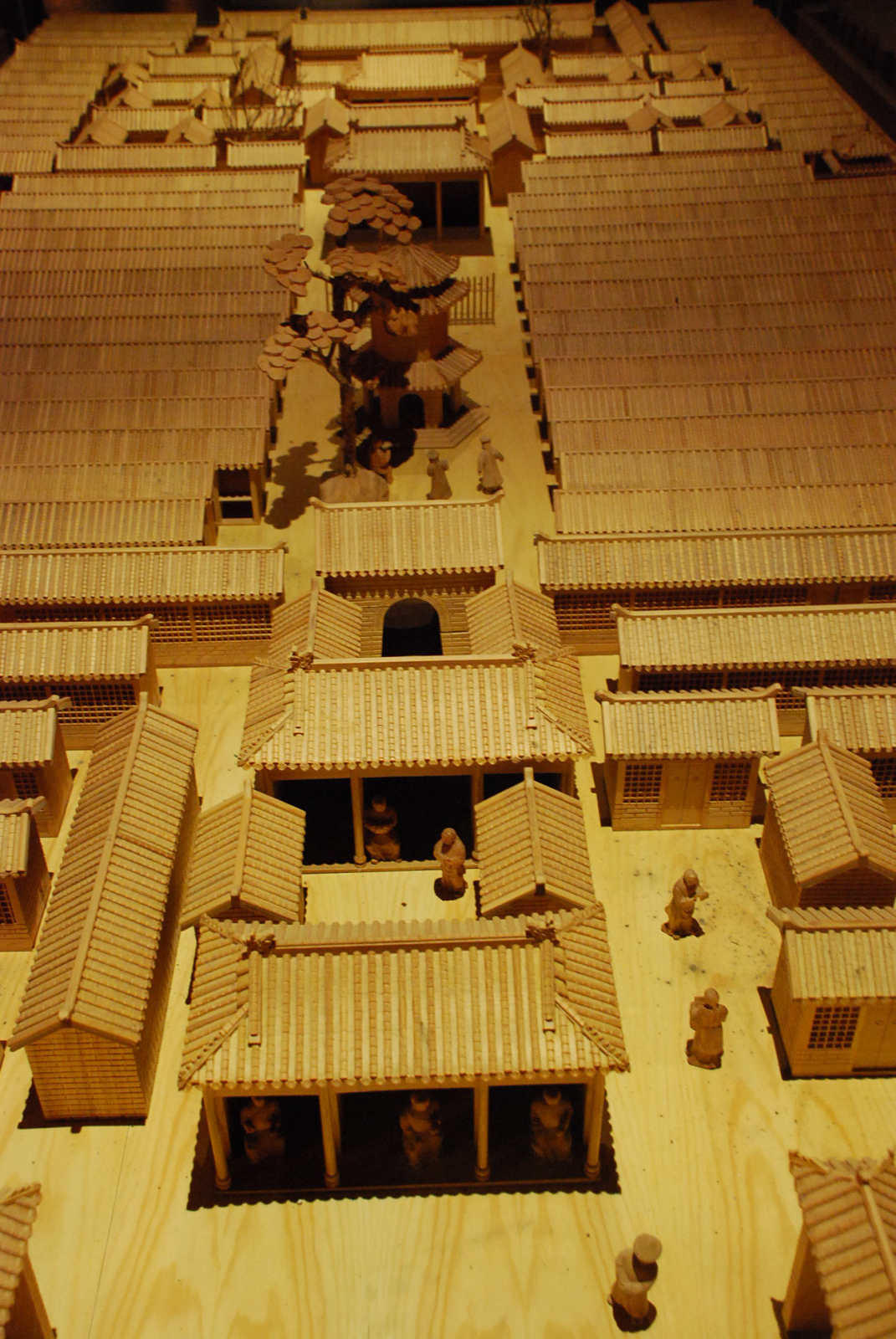
A model of exam cells displayed at Beijing Imperial Academy

=== Sui dynasty (581–618) ===
The Sui dynasty continued the tradition of recruitment through recommendation but modified it in 587 with the requirement for every prefecture (fu) to supply three scholars a year. In 599, all capital officials of rank five and above were required to make nominations for consideration in several categories.

During the Sui dynasty, examinations for "classicists" (mingjing ke) and "cultivated talents" (xiucai ke) were introduced. Classicists were tested on the Confucian canon, which was considered an easy task at the time, so those who passed were awarded posts in the lower rungs of officialdom. Cultivated talents were tested on matters of statecraft as well as the Confucian canon. In 607, Emperor Yang of Sui established a new category of examinations for the "presented scholar" (jinshike 进士科). These three categories of examination were the origins of the imperial examination system that would last until 1905. Consequently, the year 607 is also considered by many to be the real beginning of the imperial examination system. The Sui dynasty was itself short lived however and the system was not developed further until much later.

The imperial examinations did not significantly shift recruitment selection in practice during the Sui dynasty. Schools at the capital still produced students for appointment. Inheritance of official status was also still practiced. Men of the merchant and artisan classes were still barred from officialdom. However, the reign of Emperor Wen of Sui (r. 581–604) did see much greater expansion of government authority over officials. Under Emperor Wen, all officials down to the district level had to be appointed by the Department of State Affairs in the capital and were subjected to annual merit rating evaluations. Regional Inspectors and District Magistrates had to be transferred every three years and their subordinates every four years. They were not allowed to bring their parents or adult children with them upon reassignment of territorial administration. The Sui did not establish any hereditary kingdoms or marquisates (hóu) of the Han sort. To compensate, nobles were given substantial stipends and staff. Aristocratic officials were ranked based on their pedigree with distinctions such as "high expectations", "pure", and "impure" so that they could be awarded offices appropriately.

=== Tang dynasty (618–907) ===
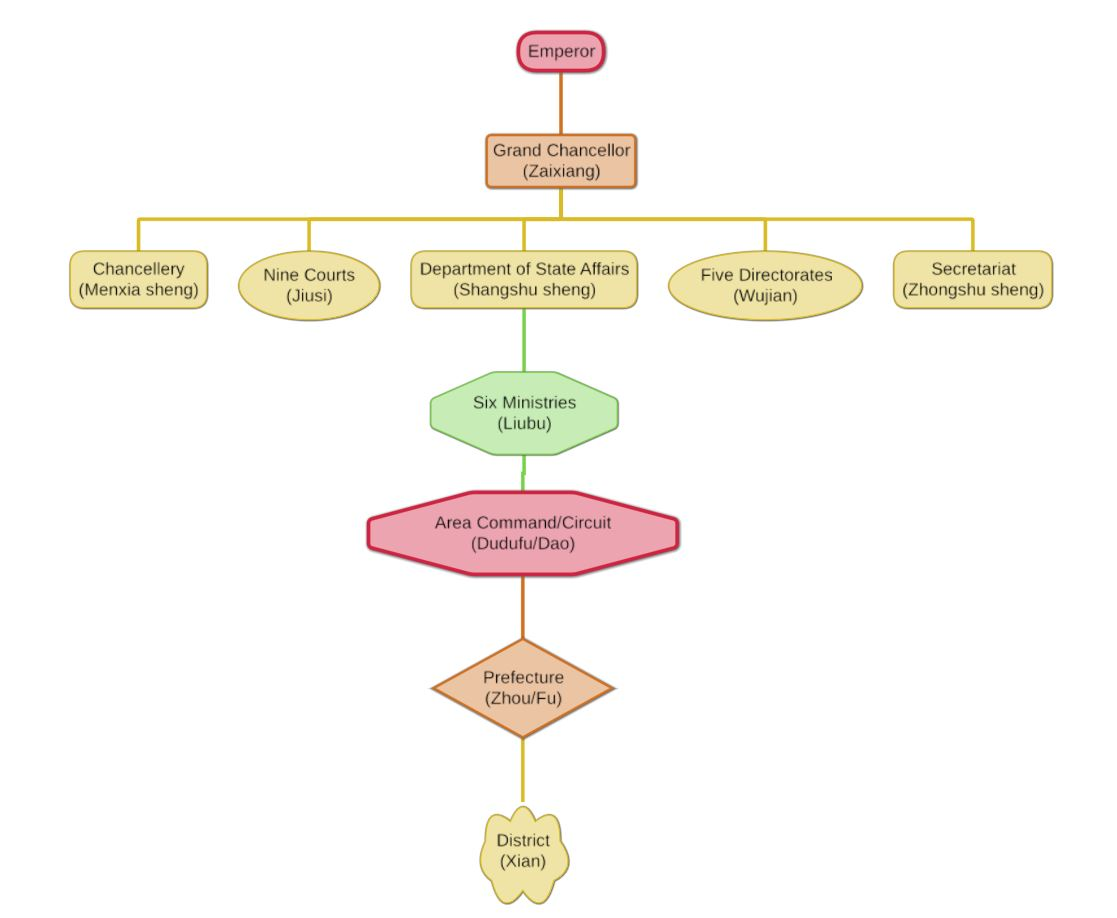
Tang-dynasty government hierarchy

The Tang dynasty and the Zhou interregnum of Empress Wu (Wu Zetian) expanded examinations beyond the basic process of qualifying candidates based on questions of policy matters followed by an interview. Oral interviews as part of the selection process were theoretically supposed to be an unbiased process, but in practice favored candidates from elite clans based in the capitals of Chang'an and Luoyang; candidates who spoke only a non-elite dialect could not succeed.

Under the Tang, six categories of regular civil service examinations were organized by the Department of State Affairs and held by the Ministry of Rites: cultivated talents, classicists, presented scholars, legal experts, writing experts, and arithmetic experts. Emperor Xuanzong of Tang also added categories for Daoism and apprentices. The hardest of these examination categories, the presented scholar jinshi degree, became more prominent over time until it superseded all other examinations. By the late Tang the jinshi degree became a prerequisite for appointment into higher offices. Appointments by recommendation were also required to take examinations.

The examinations were carried out in the first lunar month. After the results were completed, the list of results was submitted to the grand chancellor, who had the right to alter the results. Sometimes the list was also submitted to the Secretariat-Chancellery for additional inspection. The emperor could also announce a repeat of the exam. The list of results was then published in the second lunar month.

Classicists were tested by being presented phrases from the classic texts. Then they had to write the whole paragraph to complete the phrase. If the examinee was able to correctly answer five of ten questions, they passed. This was considered such an easy task that a 30-year-old candidate was said to be old for a classicist examinee, but young to be a jinshi. An oral version of the classicist examination known as moyi also existed but consisted of 100 questions rather than just ten. In contrast, the jinshi examination not only tested the Confucian classics, but also history, proficiency in compiling official documents, inscriptions, discursive treatises, memorials, and poems and rhapsodies. Because the number of jinshi graduates were so low they acquired great social standing in society. The judicial, arithmetic, and clerical examinations were also held but these graduates only qualified for their specific agencies.

Candidates who passed the exam were not automatically granted office. They still had to pass a quality evaluation by the Ministry of Rites, after which they were allowed to wear official robes.

==== Wu Zhou dynasty ====
Wu Zetian's reign was a pivotal moment for the imperial examination system. The reason for this was because up until that point, the Tang rulers had all been male members of the Li family. Wu Zetian, who officially took the title of emperor in 690, was a woman outside the Li family who needed an alternative base of power. Reform of the imperial examinations featured prominently in her plan to create a new class of elite bureaucrats derived from humbler origins. Both the palace and military examinations were created under Wu Zetian.

In 655, Wu Zetian graduated 44 candidates with the jìnshì degree (進士), and during one seven-year period the annual average of exam takers graduated with a jinshi degree was greater than 58 persons per year. Wu lavished favors on the newly graduated jinshi degree-holders, increasing the prestige associated with this path of attaining a government career, and clearly began a process of opening up opportunities to success for a wider population pool, including inhabitants of China's less prestigious southeast area. Wu Zetian's government further expanded the civil service examination system by allowing certain commoners and gentry previously disqualified by their non-elite backgrounds to take the tests. Most of the Li family supporters were located to the northwest, particularly around the capital city of Chang'an. Wu's progressive accumulation of political power through enhancement of the examination system involved attaining the allegiance of previously under-represented regions, alleviating frustrations of the literati, and encouraging education in various locales so even people in the remote corners of the empire would study to pass the imperial exams. These degree-holders would then become a new nucleus of elite bureaucrats around which the government could center itself.

In 681, a fill in the blank test based on knowledge of the Confucian classics was introduced.

Examples of officials whom she recruited through her reformed examination system include Zhang Yue, Li Jiao, and Shen Quanqi.

By the eighth century, the imperial examination had become a central instrument of political recruitment within the Tang state. Although aristocratic ideals of birth and lineage persisted, the system increasingly rewarded academic performance and mastery of the classics over inherited status. Success in the jinshi examinations provided ambitious scholars from beyond the old metropolitan clans a viable route into high office, and the resulting influx of new officials reshaped the composition of the elite. Recent research demonstrates that this transformation began well before the Song period: from the late seventh century onward, family pedigree steadily lost its predictive power for bureaucratic appointment, while examination success became the dominant determinant of official rank. Quantitative studies of Tang elites therefore show that the imperial examination was not merely a formal institution but the decisive mechanism through which aristocratic privilege was displaced by a merit-based bureaucracy.

From 702 onward, the names of examinees were hidden to prevent examiners from knowing who was tested. Prior to this, it was even a custom for candidates to present their examiner with their own literary works in order to impress him.

==== Tang restoration ====
Sometime between 730 and 740, after the Tang restoration, a section requiring the composition of original poetry (including both shi and fu) was added to the tests, with rather specific set requirements: this was for the jinshi degree, as well as certain other tests. The less-esteemed examinations tested for skills such as mathematics, law, and calligraphy. The success rate on these tests of knowledge on the classics was between 10 and 20 percent, but for the thousand or more candidates going for a jinshi degree each year in which it was offered, the success rate for the examinees was only between 1 and 2 percent: a total of 6,585 jinshi were created during the course of the Tang dynasty (an average of only about 23 jinshi awarded per year).

During the early years of the Tang restoration, subsequent emperors expanded on Wu Zetian's examination policies, finding them politically useful, and the number of jinshi degrees awarded continued to rise. This growth produced new bureaucratic factions linking examiners and graduates, a dynamic that would shape Tang politics into the ninth century. Older scholarship once suggested that the imperial examination system only became decisive after the political collapse of the Tang dynasty in the late ninth century, when the turmoil of the dynasty's final decades allegedly swept away the great clans. Recent research, however, shows that this interpretation is mistaken: by the late seventh and eighth centuries, aristocratic family pedigree had already lost much of its predictive power for official appointment, while examination success had become the dominant route to high office. The upheavals at the end of the dynasty accelerated but did not cause this transformation. The Tang imperial examination thus represents the true institutional turning point in China's shift from pedigree-based aristocracy to a bureaucratic meritocracy.

=== Song dynasty (960–1279) ===
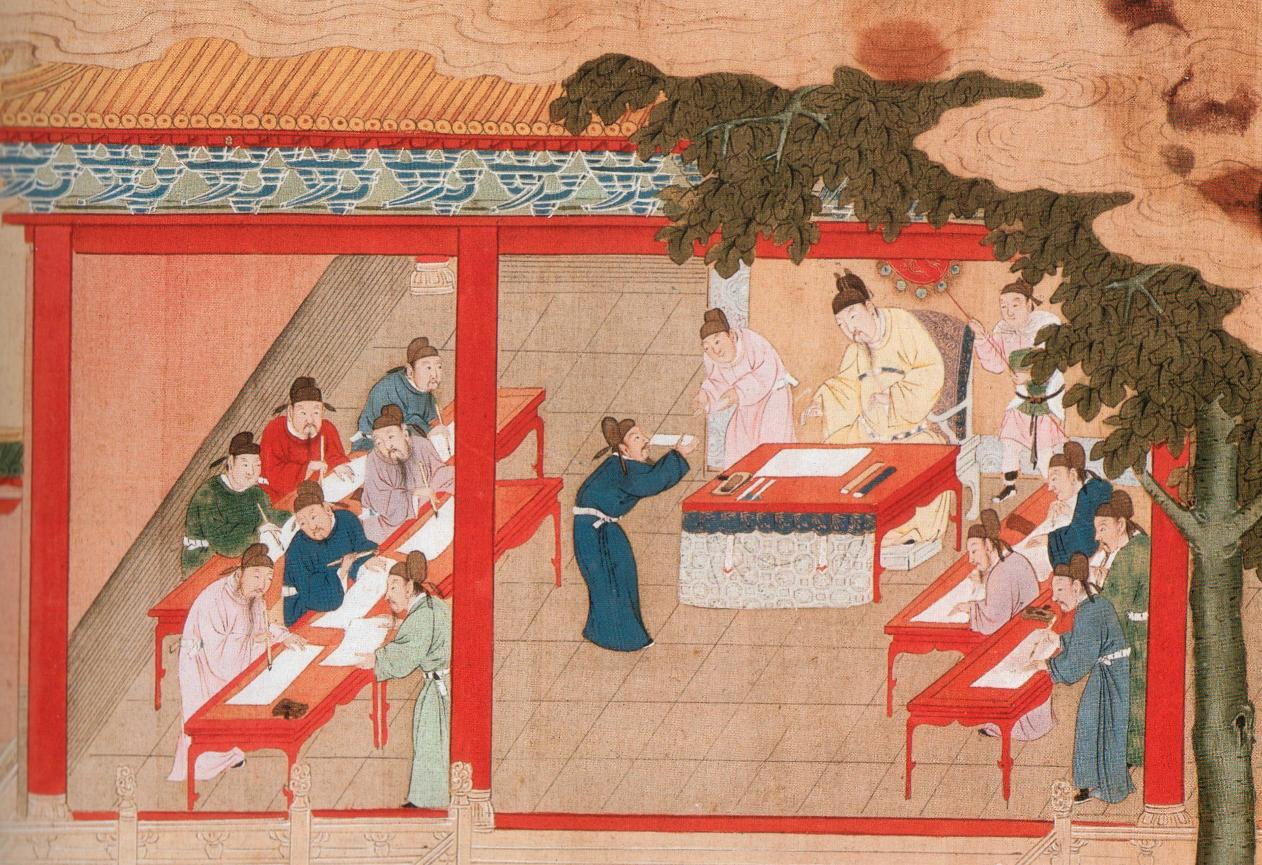
The emperor receives a candidate during the Palace Examination. Song dynasty.

In the Song dynasty (960–1279), the imperial examinations became the primary method of recruitment for official posts. More than a hundred palace examinations were held during the dynasty, resulting in a greater number of jinshi degrees rewarded. The examinations were opened to adult Chinese males, with some restrictions, including even individuals from the occupied northern territories of the Liao and Jin dynasties. Figures given for the number of examinees record 70–80,000 in 1088 and 79,000 at the turn of the 12th century. In the mid-11th century, between 5,000 and 10,000 took the metropolitan examinations in a given year. By the mid-12th century, 100,000 candidates registered for the prefectural examinations each year, and by the mid-13th century, more than 400,000. The number of active jinshi degree holders ranged from 5,000 to 10,000 between the 11th and 13th centuries, representing 7,085 of 18,700 posts in 1046 and 8,260 of 38,870 posts in 1213. Statistics indicate that the Song imperial government degree-awards eventually more than doubled the highest annual averages of those awarded during the Tang dynasty, with 200 or more per year on average being common, and at times reaching a per annum figure of almost 240.

The examination hierarchy was formally divided into prefectural, metropolitan, and palace examinations. The prefectural examination was held on the 15th day of the eighth lunar month. Graduates of the prefectural examination were then sent to the capital for metropolitan examination, which took place in Spring, but had no fixed date. Graduates of the metropolitan examination were then sent to the palace examination.

Many individuals of low social status were able to rise to political prominence through success in the imperial examination. According to studies of degree-holders in the years 1148 and 1256, approximately 57 percent originated from families without a father, grandfather, or great-grandfather who had held official rank. However most did have some sort of relative in the bureaucracy. Prominent officials who went through the imperial examinations include Wang Anshi, who proposed reforms to make the exams more practical, and Zhu Xi (1130–1200), whose interpretations of the Four Classics became the orthodox Neo-Confucianism which dominated later dynasties. Two other prominent successful entries into politics through the examination system were Su Shi (1037–1101) and his brother Su Zhe (1039–1112): both of whom became political opponents of Wang Anshi. The process of studying for the examination tended to be time-consuming and costly, requiring time to spare and tutors. Most of the candidates came from the numerically small but relatively wealthy land-owning scholar-official class.

Since 937, by the decision of the Emperor Taizu of Song, the palace examination was supervised by the emperor himself. In 992, the practice of anonymous submission of papers during the palace examination was introduced; it was spread to the departmental examinations in 1007, and to the prefectural level in 1032. Starting in 1037, it was forbidden for examiners to supervise examinations in their home prefecture. Examiners and high officials were also forbidden from contacting each other prior to the exams. The practice of recopying papers in order to prevent revealing the candidate's calligraphy was introduced at the capital and departmental level in 1015, and in the prefectures in 1037.

In 1009, Emperor Zhenzong of Song (r. 997–1022) introduced quotas on degrees awarded. In 1090, only 40 degrees were awarded to 3,000 candidates in Fuzhou, which meant only one degree would be awarded for every 75 candidates. The quota system became even more stringent in the 13th century when only one percent of candidates were allowed to pass the prefectural examination. Even graduates of the lowest tier of examinations represented an elite class.

In 1071, Emperor Shenzong of Song (r. 1067–1085) abolished the classicist as well as various other examinations on law and arithmetics. The jinshi examination became the primary gateway to officialdom. Judicial and classicist examinations were revived shortly after. However the judicial examination was classified as a special examination and not many people took the classicist examination. The oral version of the classicist exam was abolished. Other special examinations for household and family member of officials, Minister of Personnel, and subjects such as history as applied to current affairs (shiwu ce, Policy Questions), translation, and judicial matters were also administered by the state. Policy Questions became an essential part of following examinations. An exam called the cewen, which focused on contemporary matters such as politics, economics, and military affairs, was introduced.

The Song also saw the introduction of a new examination essay, that of jing yi (exposition on the meaning of the Classics). This required candidates to compose a logically coherent essay by juxtaposing quotations from the Classics or sentences of similar meaning to certain passages. This reflected the stress the Song placed on creative understanding of the Classics. It would eventually develop into the so-called 'eight-legged essays' (bagu wen) that gave the defining character to the Ming and Qing examinations.

— Thomas H. C. Lee

Various reforms or attempts to reform the examination system were made during the Song dynasty by individuals such as Fan Zhongyan, Zhu Xi, and by Wang Anshi. Wang and Zhu successfully argued that poems and rhapsodies should be excluded from the examinations because they were of no use to administration or cultivation of virtue. The poetry section of the examination was removed in the 1060s. Fan's memorial to the throne initiated a process which lead to major educational reform through the establishment of a comprehensive public school system.

=== Liao dynasty (916–1125) ===
The Khitans who ruled the Liao dynasty only held imperial examinations for regions with large Han populations. The Liao examinations focused on lyric-meter poetry and rhapsodies. The Khitans themselves did not take the exams until 1115 when it became an acceptable avenue for advancing their careers.

=== Jin dynasty (1115–1234) ===
The Jurchens of the Jin dynasty held two separate examinations to accommodate their former Liao and Song subjects. In the north examinations focused on lyric-meter poetry and rhapsodies while in the south, Confucian Classics were tested. During the reign of Emperor Xizong of Jin (r. 1135–1150), the contents of both examinations were unified and examinees were tested on both genres. Emperor Zhangzong of Jin (r. 1189–1208) abolished the prefectural examinations. Emperor Shizong of Jin (r. 1161–1189) created the first examination conducted in the Jurchen language, with a focus on political writings and poetry. Graduates of the Jurchen examination were called "treatise graduates" (celun jinshi) to distinguish them from the regular Chinese jinshi.

=== Yuan dynasty (1271–1368) ===
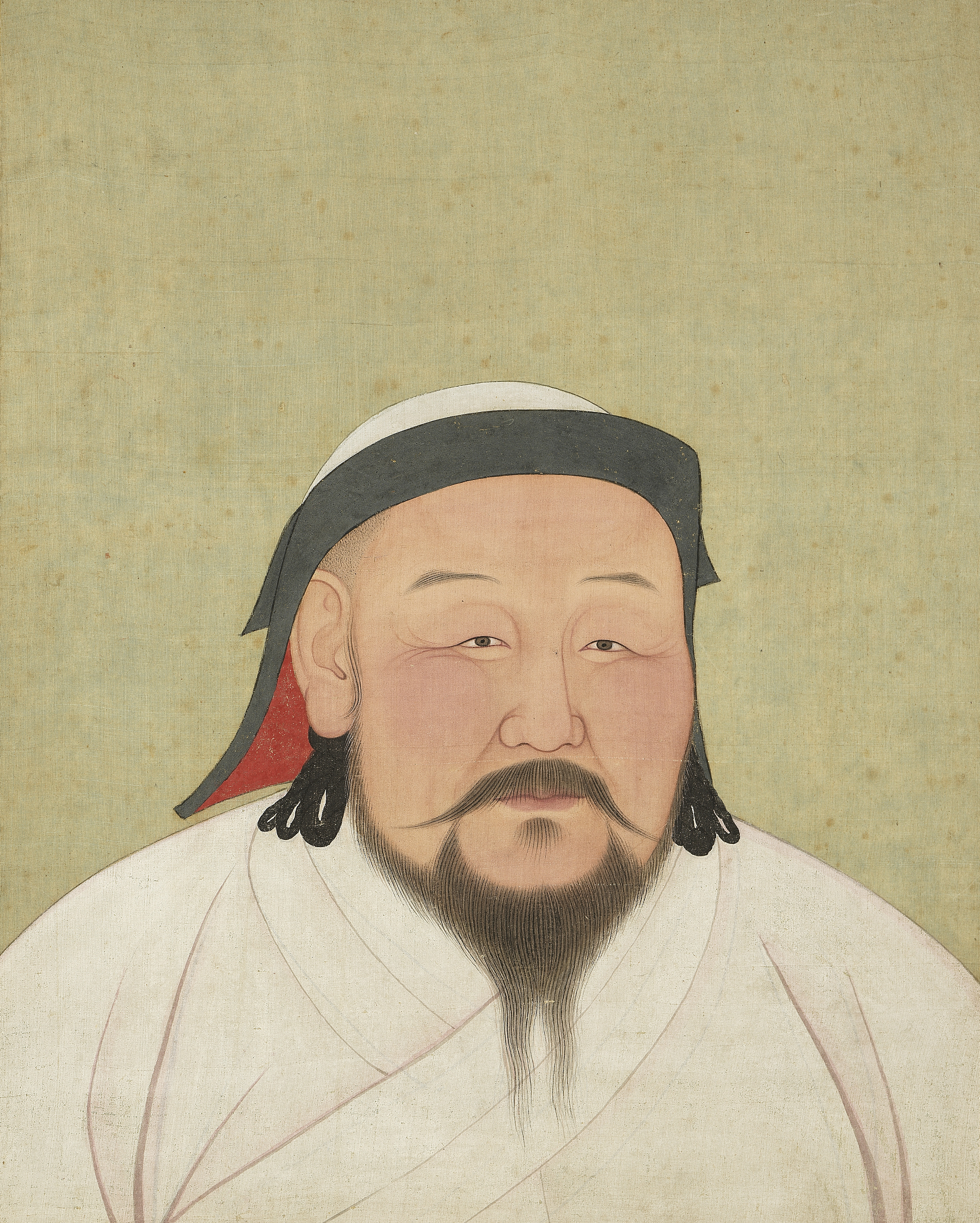
Kublai Khan

Imperial examinations were ceased for a time with the defeat of the Song in 1279 by Kublai Khan and his Yuan dynasty. One of Kublai's main advisers, Liu Bingzhong, submitted a memorial recommending the restoration of the examination system; however, this was not done. Kublai ended the imperial examination system, as he believed that Confucian learning was not needed for government jobs. Also, Kublai was opposed to such a commitment to the Chinese language and to the ethnic Han scholars who were so adept at it, as well as its accompanying ideology: he wished to appoint his own people without relying on an apparatus inherited from a newly conquered and sometimes rebellious country. The discontinuation of the exams had the effect of reducing the prestige of traditional learning, reducing the motivation for doing so, as well as encouraging new literary directions not motivated by the old means of literary development and success.

The examination system was revived in 1315, with significant changes, during the reign of Ayurbarwada Buyantu Khan. The new examination system organized its examinees into regional categories in a way which favored Mongols and severely disadvantaged Southern Chinese. A quota system both for number of candidates and degrees awarded was instituted based on the classification of the four groups, those being the Mongols, their non-Han allies (Semu-ren), Northern Chinese, and Southern Chinese, with further restrictions by province favoring the northeast of the empire (Mongolia) and its vicinities. A quota of 300 persons was fixed for provincial examinations with 75 persons from each group. The metropolitan exam had a quota of 100 persons with 25 persons from each group. Candidates were enrolled on two lists with the Mongols and Semu-ren located on the left and the Northern and Southern Chinese on the right. Examinations were written in Chinese and based on Confucian and Neo-Confucian texts but the Mongols and Semu-ren received easier questions to answer than the Han. Successful candidates were awarded one of three ranks. All graduates were eligible for official appointment.

The Yuan decision to use Zhu Xi's classical scholarship as the examination standard was critical in enhancing the integration of the examination system with Confucian educational experience. Both Chinese and non-Chinese candidates were recruited separately, to guarantee that non-Chinese officials could control the government, but this also furthered Confucianisation of the conquerors.

— Thomas H. C. Lee

Under the revised system, the yearly averages for examination degrees awarded was about 21. The way in which the four regional racial categories were divided tended to favor the Mongols, Semu-ren, and North Chinese, despite the South Chinese being by far the largest portion of the population. The 1290 census figures record some 12 million households (about 48% of the total Yuan population) for South China, versus 2 million North Chinese households, and the populations of Mongols and Semu-ren were both less. While South China was technically allotted 75 candidates for each provincial exam, only 28 Han Chinese from South China were included among the 300 candidates, the rest of the South China slots (47) being occupied by resident Mongols or Semu-ren, although 47 "racial South Chinese" who were not residents of South China were approved as candidates.

=== Ming dynasty (1368–1644) ===
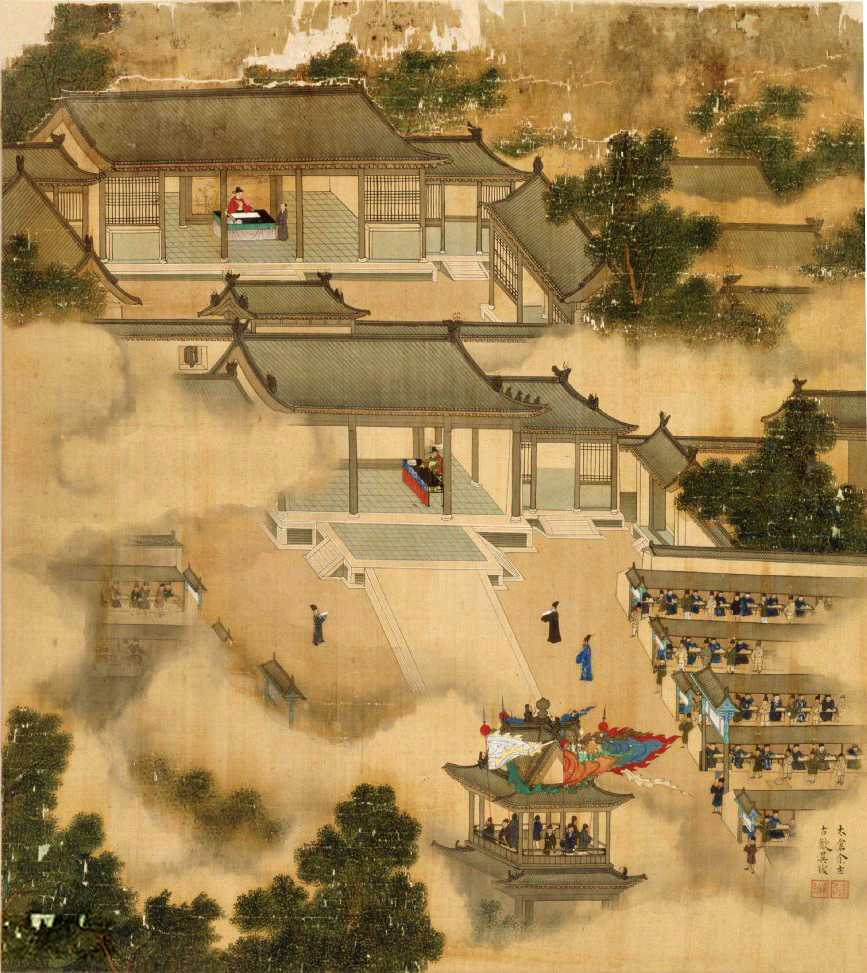
"The Official Career of Xu Xianqing", 1590, Ming dynasty

The Ming dynasty (1368–1644) retained and expanded the system it inherited. The Hongwu Emperor was initially reluctant to restart the examinations, considering their curriculum to be lacking in practical knowledge. In 1370 he declared that the exams would follow the Neo-Confucian canon put forth by Zhu Xi in the Song dynasty: the Four Books, discourses, and political analysis. Then he abolished the examinations two years later because he preferred appointment by referral. In 1384, the examinations were revived again, however in addition to the Neo-Confucian canon, Hongwu added another portion to the exams to be taken by successful candidates five days after the first exam. These new exams emphasized shixue (practical learning), including subjects such as law, mathematics, calligraphy, horse riding, and archery. The emperor was particularly adamant about the inclusion of archery, and for a few days after issuing the edict, he personally commanded the Guozijian and county-level schools to practice it diligently. As a result of the new focus on practical learning, from 1384 to 1756/57, all provincial and metropolitan examinations incorporated material on legal knowledge and the palace examinations included policy questions on current affairs. The first palace examination of the Ming dynasty was held in 1385.

Provincial and metropolitan exams were organized in three sessions. The first session consisted of three questions on the examinee's interpretation of the Four Books, and four on the Classics corpus. The second session took place three days later, and consisted of a discursive essay, five critical judgments, and one in the style of an edict, an announcement and a memorial. Three days after that, the third session was held, consisting of five essays on the Classics, historiography, and contemporary affairs. The palace exam was just one session, consisting of questions on critical matters in the Classics or current affairs. Written answers were expected to follow a predefined structure called the eight-legged essay, which consisted of eight parts: opening, amplification, preliminary exposition, initial argument, central argument, latter argument, final argument, and conclusion. The length of the essay ranged between 550 and 700 characters. Gu Yanwu considered the eight-legged essay to be worse than the book burning of Qin Shi Huang and his burying alive of 460 Confucian scholars.

The content of the examinations in the Ming and Qing times remained very much the same as that in the Song, except that literary composition was now widened to include government documents. The most important was the weight given to eight-legged essays. As a literary style, they are constructed on logical reasoning for coherent exposition. However, as the format evolved, they became excessively rigid, to ensure fair grading. Candidates often only memorised ready essays in the hope that the ones they memorised might be the examination questions. Since all questions were taken from the Classics, there were just so many possible passages that the examiners could use for questions. More often than not, the questions could be a combination of two or more totally unrelated passages. Candidates could be at a complete loss as to how to make out their meaning, let alone writing a logically coherent essay. This aroused strong criticism, but the use of the style remained until the end of the examination system.

— Thomas H. C. Lee

The Hanlin Academy played a central role in the careers of examination graduates during the Ming dynasty. Graduates of the metropolitan exam with honors were directly appointed senior compilers in the Hanlin Academy. Regular metropolitan exam graduates were appointed junior compilers or examining editors. In 1458, appointment in the Hanlin Academy and the Grand Secretariat was restricted to jinshi graduates. Posts such as minister or vice minister of rites or right vice minister of personnel were also restricted to jinshi graduates. The training jinshi graduates underwent in the Hanlin Academy allowed them insight into a wide range of central government agencies. Ninety percent of Grand Chancellors during the Ming dynasty were jinshi degree holders.

The Neo-Confucian orthodoxy became the new guideline for literati learning, narrowing the way in which they could politically and socially interpret the Confucian canon. At the same time, commercialization of the economy and booming population growth resulted in an inflation of the number of degree candidates at the lower levels. The Ming bureaucracy did not increase degree quotas in proportion to the increased population. Near the end of the Ming dynasty, in 1600, there were roughly 500,000 shengyuan in a population of 150 million, that is, one per 300 people. This trend of booming population but artificial limitation of degrees awarded continued into the Qing dynasty, when during the mid-19th century, the ratio of shengyuan to population had shrunk to one per each thousand people. Access to government office became not only extremely difficult, but officials also became more orthodox in their thinking. The higher and more prestigious offices were still dominated by jinshi degree-holders, similar to the Song dynasty, but tended to come from elite families.

The social background of metropolitan graduates also narrowed as time went on. In the early years of the Ming dynasty only 14 percent of metropolitan graduates came from families that had a history of providing officials, while in the last years of the Ming roughly 60 percent of metropolitan exam graduates came from established elite families.

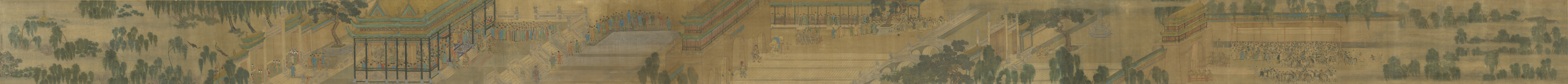
"Viewing the Pass List", attributed to Qiu Ying (c. 1494–1552), Ming dynasty. Handscroll, ink and colors on silk, 34.4 × 638 cm

=== Qing dynasty (1644–1912) ===
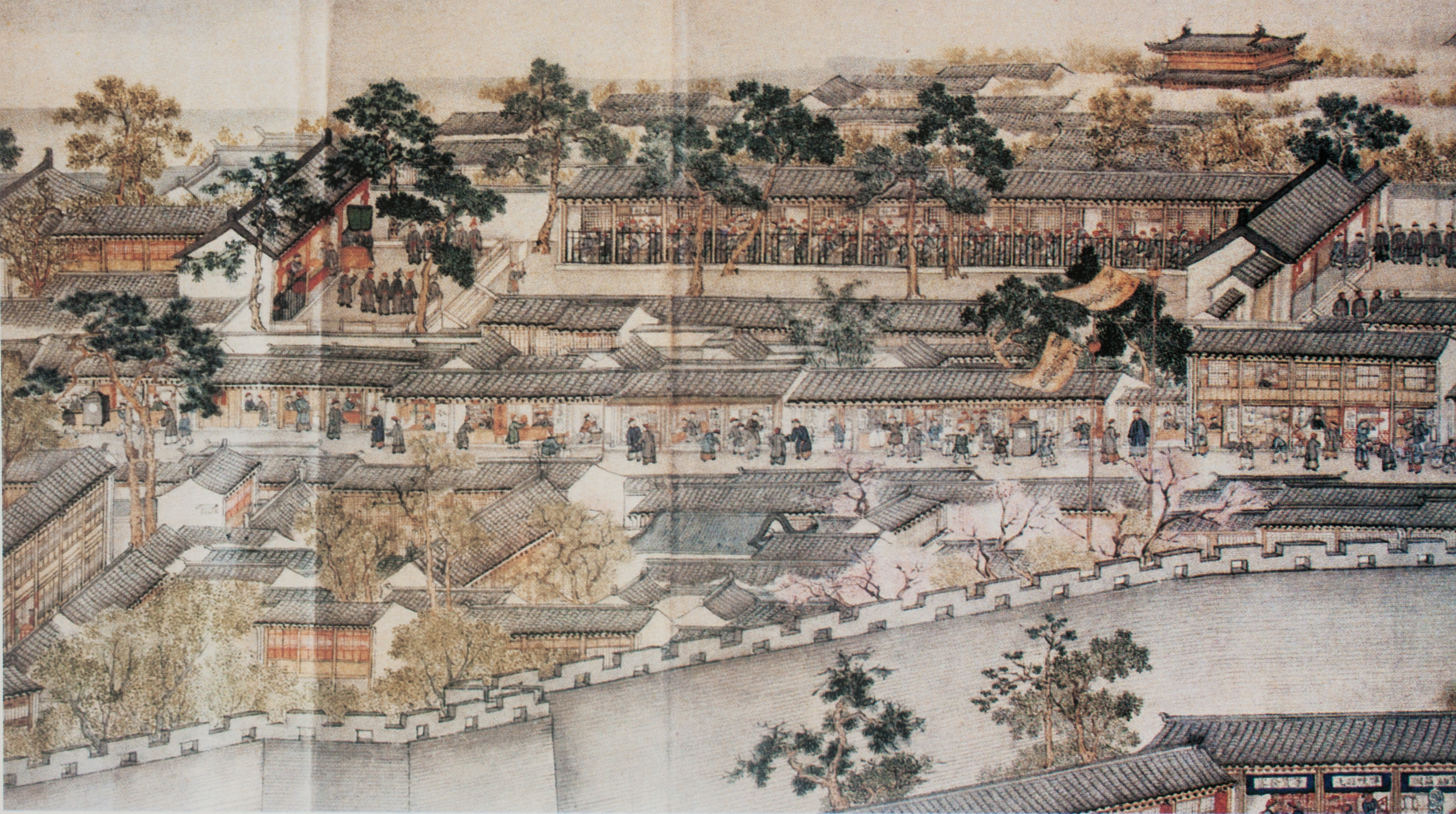
Examination hall, Prosperous Suzhou by Xu Yang, 1759

The ambition of Hong Taiji, the first emperor of the Qing dynasty, was to use the examinations to foster a cadre of Manchu Bannermen who were both martial and literate to administer the government. He initiated the first exam for bannermen in 1638, offered in both Manchu and Chinese, even before his troops took Beijing in 1644. But the Manchu bannermen had no time or money to prepare for the exams, especially since they could gain advancement on the battlefield, and the dynasty went on to rely on both Manchu and Han Chinese officials chosen through the system inherited with minor adaptation from the Ming. During the dynasty a total of 26,747 jinshi degrees were earned in 112 examinations held over the 261 years 1644–1905, an average of 238.8 jinshi degrees conferred per examination.

Racial quotas were placed on the number of graduates permitted. In the early Qing period, a 4:6 Manchu to Han quota was placed on the palace examination, and was in effect until 1655. Separate examinations were held for bannermen from 1652 to 1655 with a ten-point racial quota of 4:2:4 for Manchus, Mongols, and Han Chinese. In 1651, "translation" examinations were implemented for bannermen, however the purpose of these exams was not to create translators, but to service those Manchus and bannermen who did not understand Classical Chinese. During the reign of the Qianlong Emperor (1736–1795), Manchus and Mongols were encouraged to take the examinations in Classical Chinese. The translation examination was abolished in 1840 because there were not enough candidates to justify it. After 1723, Han Chinese graduates of the palace examination were required to learn the Manchu language. Bilingualism in Chinese and Manchu languages was favored in the bureaucracy and people who fulfilled the language requirements were given preferential appointments. For example, in 1688, a candidate from Hangzhou who was able to answer policy questions at the palace examination in both Chinese and Manchu was appointed as compiler at the Hanlin Academy, despite finishing bottom of the second tier of jinshi graduates. Ethnic minorities such as the Peng people in Jiangxi Province were given a quota of 1:50 for the shengyuan degree to encourage them to settle down and give up their nomadic way of life. In 1767, a memorial from Guangxi Province noted that some Han Chinese took advantage of the ethnic quotas to become shengyuan and that it was hard to verify who was a native. In 1784, quotas were recommended for Muslims to incorporate them into mainstream society. In 1807, a memorial from Hunan Province requested higher quotas for Miao people so that they would not have to compete with Han Chinese candidates.

Imperial examinations were not immune to corruption, one notable example was the Yangzhou xiangshi protests for the juren rank in 1711. When it was found that numerous persons who were sons of the major salt-merchant families had passed the exams, this led the students who failed the exams to accuse the governor-general and the deputy examiner of accepting bribes. Thousands of candidates paraded on the streets and eventually held the director captive. A nine-month long investigation resulted from this and the outcome found the chief examiner and the successful candidates guilty. The chief examiner was subsequently put to death.

==== Taiping Heavenly Kingdom (1851–1864) ====
The Chinese Christian Taiping Heavenly Kingdom was created in rebellion against the Qing dynasty led by a failed examination candidate Hong Xiuquan, which established its capital in Nanjing in 1851. Following the imperial example, the Taipings held exams starting in 1851. They replaced the Confucian Classes, however, with the Taiping Bible, the Old and New Testaments as edited by Hong. Candidates were expected to write eight-legged essays using quotations.

In 1853, women were for the first time in Chinese history able to become examination candidates. Fu Shanxiang took the exam and became the first (and last) female zhuangyuan in Chinese history.

=== Decline and abolition ===
By the 1830s and 1840s, proposals emerged from officials calling for reforms to the Imperial Examinations to include Western technology. In 1864, Li Hongzhang submitted proposals to add a new subject into the Imperial examinations involving Western technology, that scholars may focus their efforts entirely on this. A similar proposal was tabled by Feng Guifen in 1861 and Ding Richang (mathematics and science) in 1867. In 1872, and again in 1874, Shen Baozhen submitted proposals to the throne for the reform of the imperial examinations to include mathematics. Shen also proposed the abolition of the military examinations, which were based on obsolete weaponry such as archery. He proposed the idea that Tongwen Guan students who performed well in mathematics could be directly appointed to the Zongli Yamen as if they were Imperial examination graduates. Li Hongzhang, in an 1874 memorial, tabled the concept of "Bureaus of Western Learning" (洋学局) in coastal provinces, participation in which was to be accorded the honour of Imperial examination degrees. In 1888, the Imperial examinations was expanded to include the subject of international commerce.

With the military defeats in the 1890s and pressure to develop a national school system, reformers such as Kang Youwei and Liang Qichao called for abolition of the exams, and the Hundred Days' Reform of 1898 proposed a set of modernizations. After the Boxer Rebellion, the government drew up plans to reform under the name of New Policies. Reformers memorialized the throne to abolish the system. The key sponsors were Yuan Shikai, Yin Chang, and Zhang Zhidong (Chang Chih-tung). On 2 September 1905, the throne ordered the examination system be discontinued, beginning at the first level in 1905. The new system provided equivalents to the old degrees; a bachelor's degree, for instance, would be considered equivalent to the xiu cai.

Those who had at least the degree of shengyuan remained fairly well off since they retained their social status. Older students who had failed to even become shengyuan were more damaged because they could not easily absorb new learning, were too proud to turn to commerce, and too weak for physical labor.

== Impact ==
Left: Gate of the Guozijian in Beijing, 1871. Right: The gate in 2009.

=== Transition to scholar-bureaucracy ===
The original purpose of the imperial examinations as they were implemented during the Sui dynasty was to strike a blow against the hereditary aristocracy and to centralize power around the emperor. The era preceding the Sui dynasty, the period of Northern and Southern dynasties, was a golden age for the Chinese aristocracy. The power they wielded seriously constrained the emperor's ability to exercise his power in court, especially when it came to appointing officials. The Sui emperor created the imperial examinations to bypass and mitigate aristocratic interests. This was the origin of the Chinese examination system.

Although quite a few Northern Song families or lineages succeeded in producing high officials over several generations, none could begin to rival the great families of the Six Dynasties and Tang in longevity, prestige, or perhaps even power. Most important, the promise of the examinations transformed learning from an elite concern to a preoccupation. Education became less the domain of scholarly families comprising one portion of elite society and more an activity urged upon academically promising boys and young men throughout elite society.

— John W. Chaffee

The short-lived Sui dynasty was soon replaced by the Tang, which systematically implemented the examination system. The emperor placed the palace exam graduates, the jinshi, in important government posts, where they came into conflict with hereditary elites. During the reign of Emperor Xuanzong of Tang (713–756), about a third of the Grand Chancellors appointed were jinshi, but by the time of Emperor Xianzong of Tang (806–821), three fifths of the Grand Chancellors appointed were jinshi. By the ninth century, roughly 85 percent of Grand Chancellors had entered the bureaucracy through the examination system. This transformation gradually displaced the aristocracy's institutional dominance: by the late Tang, family pedigree had largely ceased to determine bureaucratic access, and political advancement was overwhelmingly tied to examination success. Although some members of noble lineages continued to obtain jinshi degrees, their share and political leverage declined sharply, and by the dynasty's end, aristocratic status no longer guaranteed entry into office. Hereditary privileges outside the examination system were not entirely abolished, however. In the Song Dynasty, the sons of high ministers and great generals retained the right to hold minor offices without taking the examinations. This privilege was introduced in 963 and allowed high officials to nominate their sons, nephews, and grandsons for civil service. After 1009, nominated candidates also had to study at the Guozijian, and after completing a course, sit an examination; more than 50 percent passed. Lower-level posts in the capital were awarded to these graduates.

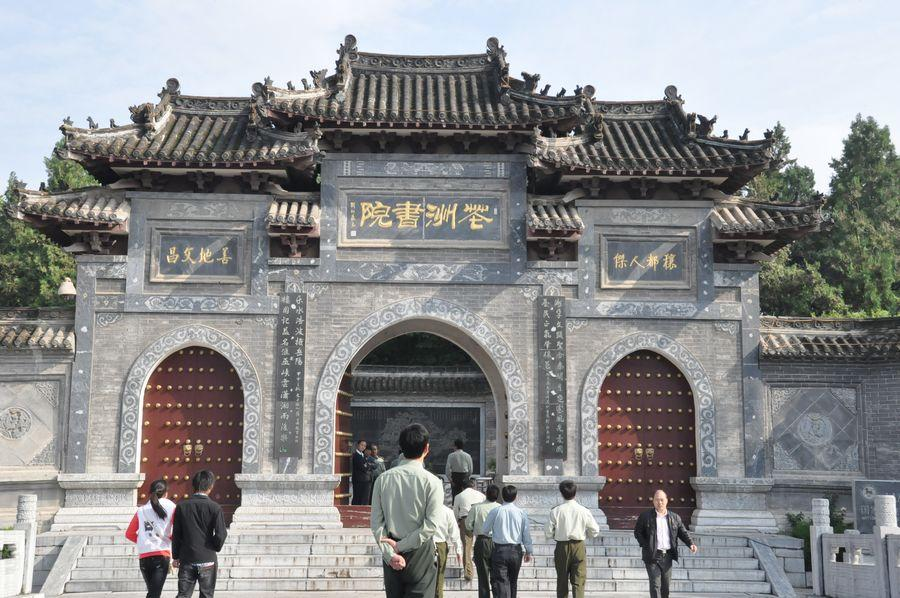
Gate of the Huazhou Shuyuan

In addition, the number of graduates were not only small, but also formed their own clique in the government based around the examiners and the men they passed. In effect the graduates became another interest group the emperor had to contend with. This problem was greatly mitigated by the increase in candidates and graduates during the Song dynasty, made possible by its robust economy. Since the entire upper echelon of the Song dynasty was filled by jinshi, and imperial clan members were barred from posts of substance, there was no longer any conflict of the type relating to different preparatory backgrounds. Efforts were made to break the link between examiner and examinee, removing another factor contributing to the formation of scholar bureaucrat cliques. While the influence of certain scholar officials never disappeared, they no longer held any influence in organizing men.

The scholar-bureaucrats, later known as Mandarins in the West, continued to exert significant influence throughout the rest of Chinese imperial history. The relationship between the emperor and his officials as seen from the side of the officials is encapsulated by Zhang Fangping's statement to Emperor Renzong of Song in the 1040s: "The empire cannot be ruled by Your Majesty alone; the empire can only be governed by Your Majesty collaborating with the officials." In 1071, Emperor Shenzong of Song remarked that Wang Anshi's New Policies were for the benefit of the people and not the shidafu, the elite literate class. His grand chancellor, Wen Yanbo, retorted, "You govern the nation with us, the officials, not with the people."

... the true characteristic of the Song political system was not autocracy but "scholar-official (shidafu) government", made possible by the existence of the examination system as a means of validating political authority. Over the long run, the emperor shifted from being a figure with administrative power to one with symbolic power, tightly constrained by the system he was part of, even if he did not always act according to the ideals his ministers urged upon him; the emperor was not the top of a pyramid but the keystone in an arch, whose successful functioning depended on his staying in his place.

— Peter K. Bol

The importance of clan identity as the chief marker of status seems to have declined by the 9th century, when the genealogical section of epitaphs excluded choronyms (combination of clan and place names) in favor of office titles. For the aristocracy, although status was still an important factor in marriage, wealth had become far more important by the time of the Southern Song (1127–1279) than the Tang era. During the Yuanyou era (1086–1093), it was reported that an imperial clanswoman had married a man surnamed Liu from the foreign quarter of Guangzhou. In 1137, a complaint was lodged against a military official for marrying his sister to the "great merchant" Pu Yali (a two-time envoy from Arabia). The foreign merchant family of Pu also sought marriage into the imperial clan.

Song Taizong possessed all of his older brother's ambitions and suspicions but almost none of his positive qualities. As a child he had no friends, and as an adult he was a poor leader of men. Liu Jingzhen has characterized him as self-confident and self-reliant, but I think a more accurate assessment would be arrogant and insecure. All of these qualities, combined with an energetic constitution, led Taizong to attempt to read every document and make every decision necessary for the operations of government. The immense quantities of paper generated by the Song bureaucracy inevitably defeated him in this project, though he continued heroically trying to master it until his death. The central irony of Taizong's reign was that the more he succeeded in centralizing the power of government and increasing the authority of the emperor, the less any individual emperor, no matter how energetic, could control that power by himself. Taizong thus unintentionally presided over the shift of the de jure nearly absolute imperial power to the de facto control of a rapidly professionalizing bureaucracy.

— Peter Lorge

=== Subordination of the military ===
Although there was a military version of the exam, it was neglected by the government. The importance of the regular imperial examinations in governance had the effect of subordinating the military to civil government. By the time of the Song dynasty, the two highest military posts of Minister of War and Chief of Staff were both reserved for civil servants. It became routine for civil officials to be appointed as front-line commanders in the army. The highest rank for a dedicated military career was reduced to unit commander. To further reduce the influence of military leaders, they were routinely reassigned at the end of a campaign, so that no lasting bond occurred between commander and soldier. The policy of appointing civil officials as ad hoc military leaders was maintained by both the Ming and Qing dynasties after the initial phase of conquest. Successful commanders entrenched solely in the military tradition such as Yue Fei were viewed with distrust and apprehension. He was eventually executed by the Song government despite successfully leading Song forces against the Jin dynasty. It is possible that foreigners also looked down on Chinese military men in contrast to their civil counterparts. In 1042, the general Fan Zhongyan refused a military title because he thought it would demean him in the eyes of the Tibetans and Tanguts. Although it negatively impacted the military's performance at times, the new relationship between the civil and military sectors of the government avoided the endemic military coups of preceding dynasties for the rest of imperial Chinese history.

=== Education ===
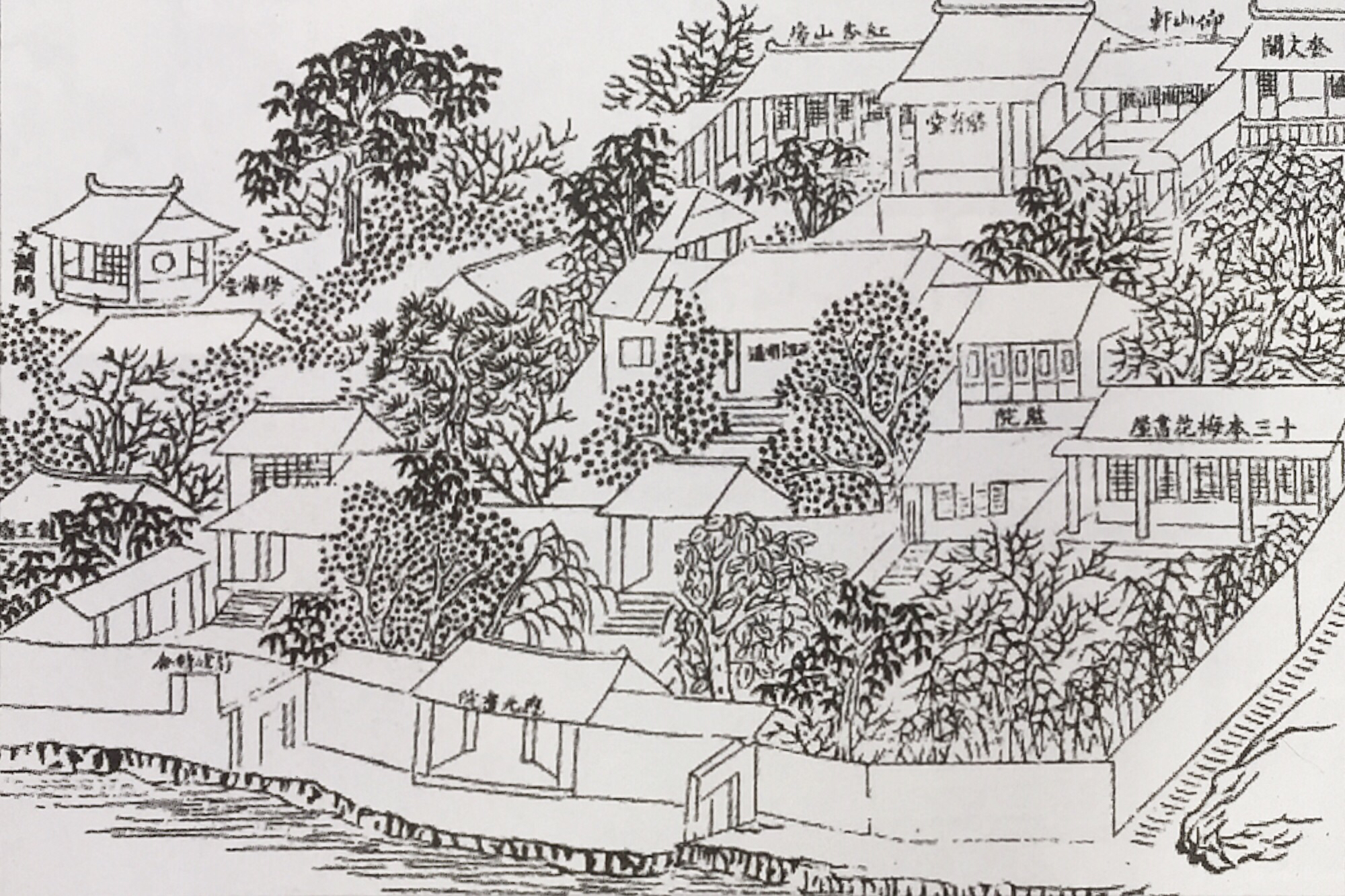
Drawing of the Yingyuan Shuyuan's layout in 1860

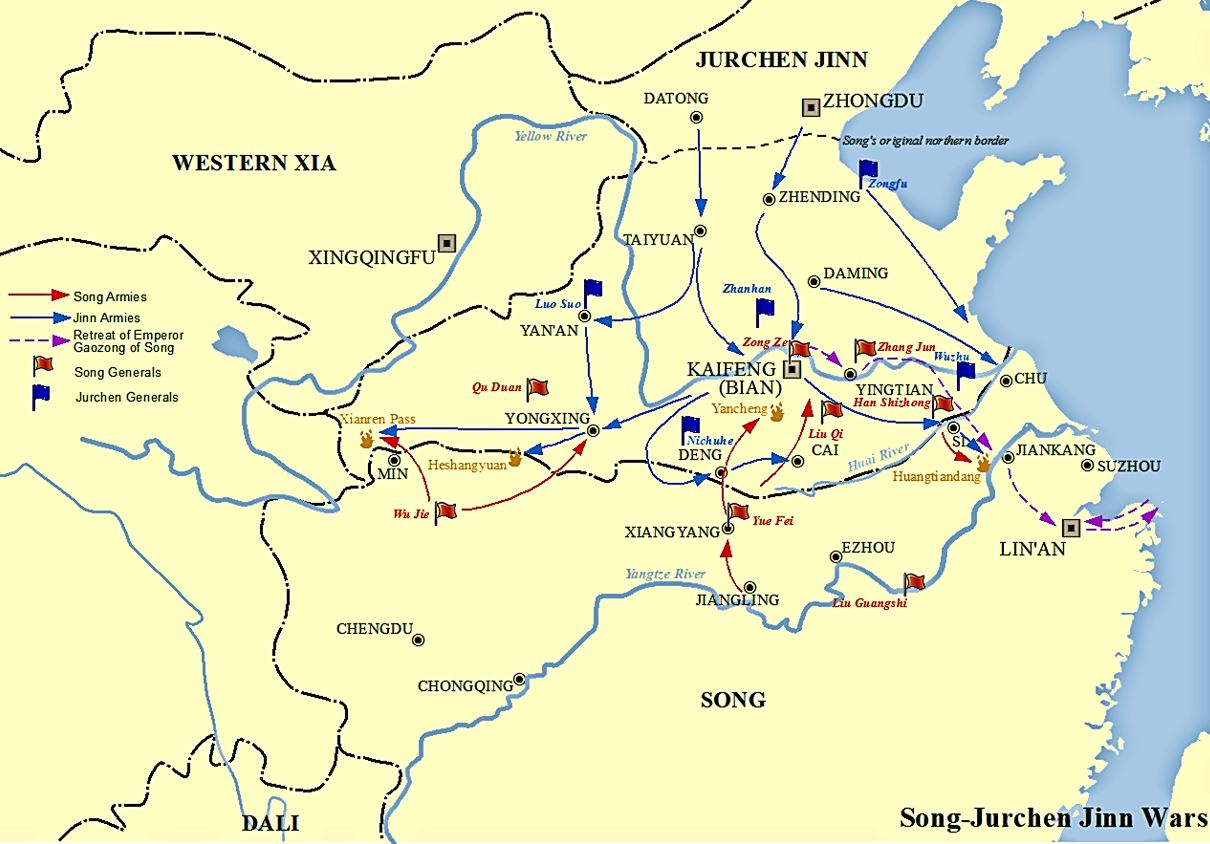
Jin–Song Wars

During the Tang period, a set curricular schedule took shape where the three steps of reading, writing, and the composition of texts had to be learnt before students could enter state academies. As the number of graduates increased, competition for government posts became more fierce. Whereas at the beginning of the Tang dynasty, there were few jinshi, during the Song dynasty, there were more than the government needed. Several reforms to education were suggested to thin the number of candidates and improve their quality. In 1044, Han Qi, Fan Zhongyan, Ouyang Xiu, and Song Qi implemented the Qingli Reforms, which included hiring experts in the classics to teach at government schools, setting up schools in every prefecture, and requiring every candidate to have attended the prefectural school for at least 300 days to qualify for the prefectural exam. Prior to the Qingli Reforms, the role of the state was limited to supporting a few institutions, such as in 1022 when the government granted a prefectural school in Yanzhou with 151 acres of land. Some of the reformers directly participated in the creation of schools. Between 1035 and 1046, Fan Zhongyan and his followers set up 16 schools. Ouyang Xiu donated 1.5 million cash for the construction of a school in his home prefecture. Han Qi did the same as well. The Qingli Reforms were abandoned after only one year.

By the end of the Northern Song ... government schools connected in a hierarchical empire-wide system, but there was a high degree of organizational uniformity as well. Prefectural school preceptorships became respected posts in local administration which, as far as we can tell, were routinely filled; educational support fields and student support provisions became the rule rather than the exception; and to cope with the rising demand of schooling, school entrance examinations became common.

— John W. Chaffee

While the Qingli Reforms failed, the ideal of a statewide education system was taken up by Wang Anshi (1021–1086), who proposed as part of his New Policies that examinations alone were not enough to select talent. His answer to the glut of graduates was to found new schools (shuyuan) for the selection of officials, with the ultimate goal of replacing the examinations altogether by selecting officials directly from the school's students. An alternative path to office was introduced: the Three Hall system. The government expanded the Taixue (National University) and ordered each circuit to grant land to schools and to hire supervising teachers for them. In 1076, a special examination for teachers was introduced. Implementation of the reforms was uneven and slow. Of the 320 prefectures, only 53 had prefectural schools with supervising teachers by 1078 and only a few were given the ordered allotment of land. Wang died and his reforms languished until the early 12th century when Emperor Huizong of Song injected more resources into the national education project. In 1102, Huizong and his chief councilor Cai Jing (1046–1126) decided to combine schools and examinations and make schools the focus of both education and recruitment. In 1103, the Taixue grew to 3,800 students with 200 in the upper hall, 600 in the lower hall, and 3,000 in the Biyong or outer hall. In 1104, students started being processed up the three-colleges (Three Hall) ranking system from the county school to the Taixue for direct appointment in the bureaucracy. In 1106, the "eight virtues" method of selection was introduced. The "eight virtues" method was to select and promote students based on eight varieties of virtuous conduct. By 1109, schools had received more than 100,000 jing of land (1.5 million acres), taken from the state granaries. Total student numbers were reported at 210,000 in 1104, 167,622 in 1109, and over 200,000 in 1116. At its height the Song education system included approximately 0.2% of its one hundred million people.

Boys entered [private primary] school at eight and [government prefectural] college at fifteen. Those whose talents could be developed were selected and gathered in the college, whereas the inferior ones were returned to the farm, for scholars and farmers did not exchange occupations. Having entered college, one would not work on the farm. Thus scholars and farmers were completely differentiated. As to support in college, there was no worry about sons of officials. But even sons of commoners, as soon as they entered college, were sure to be supported [by the state].

— Cheng Yi (1033–1107) describing the education system during his time

The new education policies were sometimes criticized and the importance of schools attacked. Su Shi believed that educational institutions were nothing more than places for students to learn the necessary techniques to pass the imperial exams. Liu Ban (1023–1089) believed that an education at home was sufficient: "Education that scholars receive at home is sufficient for them to become talented people. Why do they need to turn to teachers in government schools to do so?" In 1078, a student of the Taixue, Yu Fan, submitted a memorial accusing the instructors of bias and improper teaching. In the following year, Emperor Shenzong of Song confirmed the accusations after a Censorate investigation. In 1112, a memorial criticized the prefectural and county schools for a variety of abuses. It accused the local supervisors of not understanding the goal of educating greater talent, wasting funds by buying excess food and drink, buying superfluous decorations, profiting by selling grain at market price, borrowing from students, and engaging in acts of violence towards officials. The "eight virtues" system received many complaints about its lack of academic rigor. In 1121, the local three-college system was dismantled and the local schools ordered to return land to the government.

The instructors in the Imperial University are not impartial. After they give regular examinations to students, they rely on self-serving assessment of student performance to decide who should be promoted to the next level. In addition, Your Majesty holds court conferences at the crack of dawn, but these instructors often arrive at the university after nine and leave at eleven o'clock. Every day Your Majesty handles numerous affairs of state while attending imperial seminars. It took only a few years for you to finish learning the Book of Odes. These instructors instead have already spent seven years on the Rites of Zhou, only to complete four volumes. Analects of Confucius and Mencius are the basis of morality and the behavior of the sages. Your Majesty designs the curriculum to focus on the great Classics, but now they have yet to be taught.

— Yu Fan in a memorial to the emperor in 1078

The schools went into further decline starting from the Southern Song period (1127–1279) after the loss of the north to the Jin dynasty. The government was reluctant to fund them because they did not create immediate profits and as a result, cuts were made in teaching personnel, and the national university itself was reduced in size. The exception to this was in the 1140s when the court played an active role in reconstructing schools and made efforts to staff them with degree-holders. After this period, government involvement in state educational institutions ceased. According to contemporary complaints about the schools, they deteriorated in quality, were subjected to a variety of abuses and heterodox teaching, no teaching at all, and decline in revenue. Schools in imperial China never recovered from the decline starting from the Southern Song. For the rest of China's dynastic history, government funded academies functioned primarily as gateways to the examination system, and did not offer any real instruction to students. Functionally they were not schools but rather preparatory institutions for the examinations. Wang's goal of replacing the examinations was never realized. Although Wang's reforms fell short of their mark, they launched the first state led initiative to regulate the day to day education of its subjects through the appointment of teachers and funding of schools.

Primary education was relegated to private schools founded by kinship clusters during the Ming dynasty, although private teachers for individual households remained popular. Some schools were charity projects of the imperial government. The government also funded specialized schools for each of the Eight Banners to teach the Manchu language and Chinese. None of these institutions had a standardized curriculum or age of admission.

Song dynasty private academies
Circuit	Shuyuan	Jingshe	Acad. per prefec.	Other priv. acad.	All priv. acad.
Liangzhe East	43	3	6.6	5	21
Liangzhe West	20	0	2.9	6	26
Jiangnan East	46	3	5.1	4	53
Jiangnan West	90	3	9	2	95
Fujian	52	15	8.4	18	85
Huainan West	7	0	0.7	1	8
Jinghu South	36	0	3.6	0	36
Jinghu North	17	0	1.2	0	17
Guangnan East	34	0	2.3	1	35
Guangnan West	14	0	0.5	0	14
Chengdu	10	0	0.6	0	10
Zizhou	8	0	0.6	0	8
Lizhou	2	0	0.2	0	2
Guizhou	3	0	0.2	0	3
Jingdong East	2	0	0.2	0	2
Jingdong West	3	0	0.3	2	5
Jingxi North	6	0	0.6	0	6
Hebei West	3	0	0.2	0	3
Hedong	1	0	0.04	0	1
Yongxin	4	0	0.2	0	4
Totals	401	24	1.2	39	464

=== Surplus graduates ===
The problem of surplus graduates became especially acute starting from the 18th century. Due to the long period of peace established by the Qing dynasty, a large number of candidates were able to make significant progress in their studies and apply for the exams. Their papers were all of similar quality so that examiners found it difficult to differentiate them and make their selections. Officials began to think of new ways to eliminate candidates rather than how to select the best scholars. A complicated set of formal requirements for the examinations was created which undermined the whole system.

=== Failed candidates ===
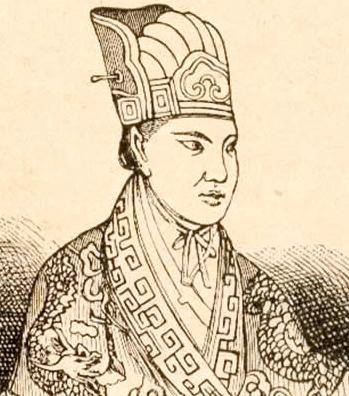
Portrait of Hong Xiuquan, 1860

Inevitably a large number of candidates failed the exams, often repeatedly. During the Tang period, the ratio of success to failure in the palace exam was 1:100 or 2:100. In the Song dynasty, the ratio of success to failure for the metropolitan exam was about 1:50. In the Ming and Qing dynasties, success to failure for the provincial exam was about 1:100. For every shengyuan in the country, only one in three thousand would ever become a jinshi. While most candidates were men of certain means, those from poor families risked everything on passing the exams. Ambitious and talented candidates who suffered repeated failures felt the bite of indignation, and failure escalated from disappointment to desperation, and sometimes even revolt.

Huang Chao led a massive rebellion in the late Tang dynasty, after it had already been weakened by the An Lushan rebellion. He was born to a wealthy family in western Shandong. After repeated failures he created a secret society that engaged in illicit salt trading. Although Huang Chao's rebellion was ultimately defeated, it led to the final disintegration of the Tang dynasty. Among Huang Chao's cohort were other failed candidates such as Li Zhen, who targeted government officials, killed them and threw their bodies into the Yellow River. Zhang Yuanhao of the Northern Song defected to Western Xia after failing the examinations. He aided the Tanguts in setting up a Chinese-style court. Niu Jinxing of the late Ming was a general in Li Zicheng's rebel army. Having failed to become a jinshi, he targeted high officials and members of the royal family, butchering them as retribution. Hong Xiuquan led the mid-19th-century Taiping Rebellion against the Qing dynasty. After his fourth and final attempt at the shengyuan exam, he had a nervous breakdown, during which he had visions of a heaven where he was part of a celestial family. Influenced by the teachings of Christian missionaries, Hong announced to his family and followers that his visions had been of God, his father, and Jesus Christ, his brother. He created the Taiping Heavenly Kingdom and waged war on the Qing dynasty, devastating parts of southeast China which would not recover for decades.

Pu Songling (1640–1715) failed the examination multiple times. He immortalized the frustrations of candidates trapped in the relentless system in numerous stories that parodied the system.

=== General discussion of late imperial system ===
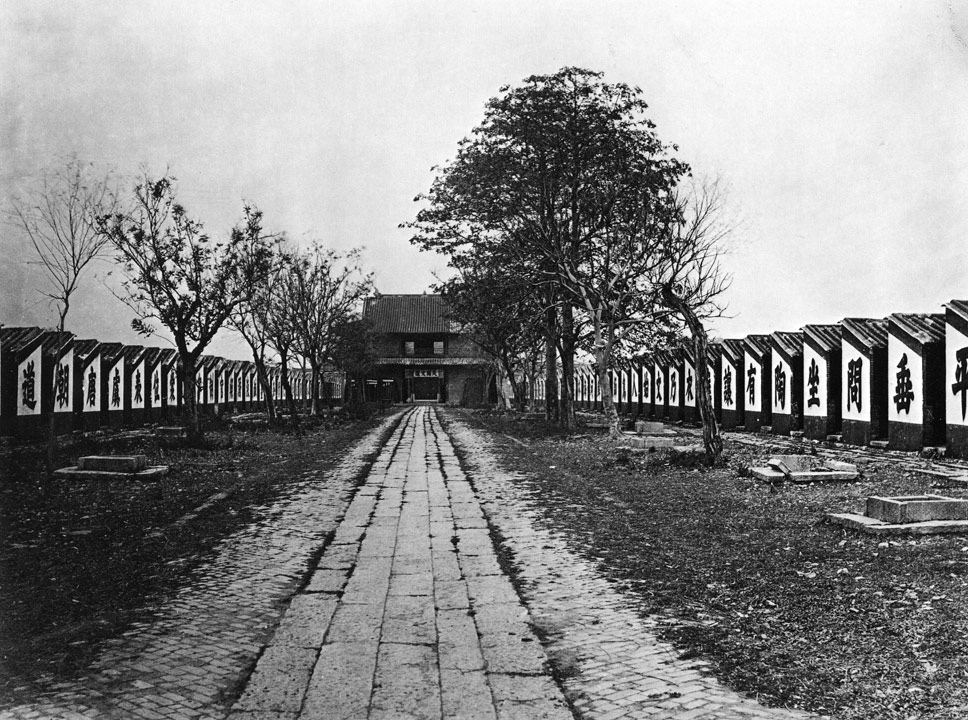
Examination hall with 7,500 cells, Guangdong, 1873

Reformers charged that the set format of the "eight-legged essay" stifled original thought, and satirists portrayed the rigidity of the system in novels such as The Scholars. In the twentieth century, the New Culture Movement portrayed the examination system as a cause for China's weakness in such stories as Lu Xun's "Kong Yiji". Some have suggested that limiting the topics prescribed in examination system removed the incentives for Chinese intellectuals to learn mathematics or to conduct experimentation, perhaps contributing to the Great Divergence, in which China's scientific and economic development fell behind Europe.

However, the political and ethical theories of Confucian classical curriculum have also been likened to the classical studies of humanism in European nations which proved instrumental in selecting an "all-rounded" top-level leadership. British and French civil service examinations adopted in the late 19th century were also heavily based on Greco-Roman classical subjects and general cultural studies, as well as assessing personal physique and character. US leaders included "virtue" such as reputation and support for the US constitution as a criterion for government service. These features have been compared to similar aspects of the earlier Chinese model. In the British civil service, just as it was in China, entrance to the civil service was usually based on a general education in ancient classics, which similarly gave bureaucrats greater prestige. The Oxbridge ideal of the civil service was identical to the Confucian ideal of a general education in world affairs through humanism. Well into the 20th century, classics, literature, history and language remained heavily favored in British civil service examinations. In the period between 1925 and 1935, 67 percent of British civil service entrants consisted of such graduates.

In late imperial China, the examination system was the primary mechanism by which the central government captured and held the loyalty of local-level elites. Their loyalty, in turn, ensured the integration of the Chinese state, and countered tendencies toward regional autonomy and the breakup of the centralized system. The examination system distributed its prizes according to provincial and prefectural quotas, which meant that imperial officials were recruited from the whole country, in numbers roughly proportional to each province's population. Elite individuals all over China, even in the disadvantaged peripheral regions, had a chance at succeeding in the examinations and achieving the rewards and emoluments office brought.

The examination-based civil service thus promoted stability and social mobility. The Confucianism-based examinations meant that the local elites and ambitious would-be members of those elites across the whole of China were taught with similar values. Even though only a small fraction (about 5 percent) of those who attempted the examinations actually passed them and even fewer received titles, the hope of eventual success sustained their commitment. Those who failed to pass did not lose wealth or local social standing; as dedicated believers in Confucian orthodoxy, they served, without the benefit of state appointments, as civilian teachers, patrons of the arts, and managers of local projects, such as irrigation works, schools, or charitable foundations.

== Taking the exams ==
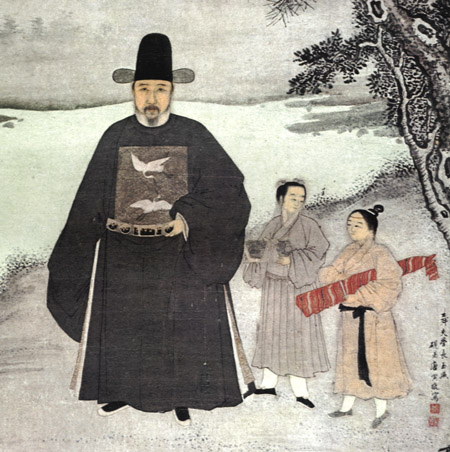
A 15th-century portrait of the Ming official Jiang Shunfu. The two cranes on his chest are a "Mandarin square" for a civil official of the first rank.

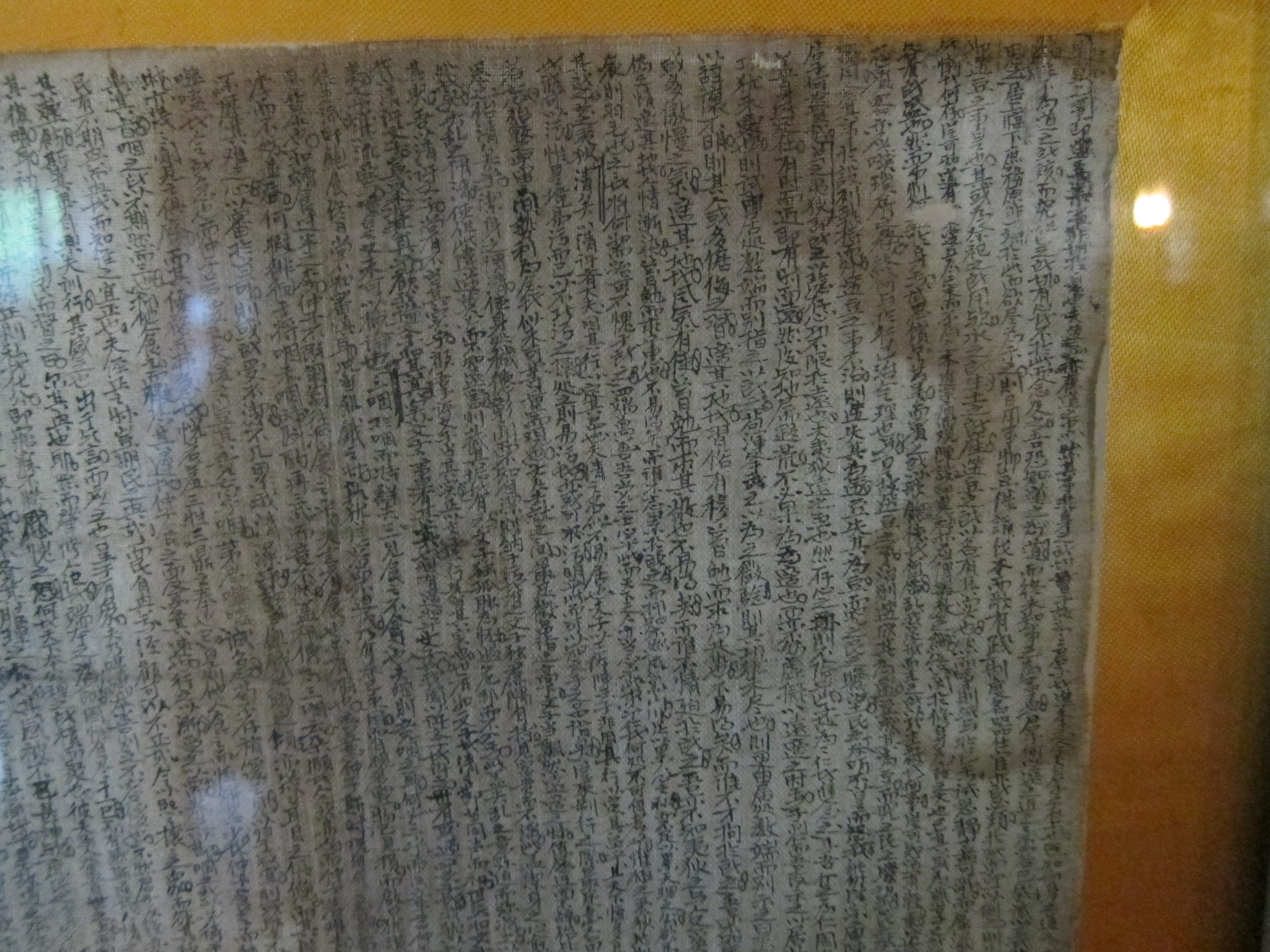
"Cribbing Garment" worn as underwear into the examination

=== Requirements ===
During the Sui dynasty, only those nominated by senior government officials could take the exam. This limitation was completely lifted in 622, when the first emperor of the Tang dynasty allowed men to self-nominate. Throughout the Tang dynasty, the vast majority of males were eligible to take the exam, establishing an open and inclusive system of recruitment. This practice continued in the Song dynasty, during which theoretically all adult Chinese men were eligible for the examinations.

In practice, a number of official and unofficial restrictions applied to who was able to take the imperial exams. The commoners were divided into four groups according to occupation: scholars, farmers, artisans, and merchants. Beneath the common people were the so-called "mean" people such as boat-people, beggars, sex-workers, entertainers, slaves, and low-level government employees. Among the forms of discrimination faced by the "mean" people were restriction from government office and the credential to take the imperial exam. Certain ethnic groups or castes such as the "degraded" Jin dynasty outcasts in Ningbo, around 3,000 people, were barred from taking the imperial exams as well. Women were excluded from taking the exams. Butchers and sorcerers were also excluded at times. Merchants were restricted from taking the exams until the Ming and Qing dynasties, although as early as 955, the scholar-officials themselves were involved in trading activities. During the Sui and Tang dynasties, artisans were also restricted from official service. During the Song dynasty, artisans, merchants, clerks, and Buddhist and Taoist priests were specifically excluded from the jinshi exam; and, in the Liao dynasty, physicians, diviners, butchers, and merchants were all prohibited from taking the examinations, citing Liao-shih. At times, quota systems were also used to restrict the number of candidates allowed to take or to pass the imperial civil service examinations, by region or by other criteria.

In one prefecture, within a few decades of the dynasty's founding, most of those who passed the jinshi examination came from families that had been members of the local elite for a generation or longer. Despite the six- or sevenfold increase in the numbers of men gaining jinshi, the sons of officials had better chances than most of getting these degrees ...

— Patricia Buckley Ebrey and Peter N. Gregory

Aside from official restrictions, there was also the economic problem faced by men of poorer means. The route to a jinshi degree was long and the competition fierce. Men who achieved a jinshi degree in their twenties were considered extremely fortunate. Someone who obtained a jinshi degree in their thirties, the average age of jinshi candidates, was also considered on schedule. Both were expected to study continuously for years without interruption. Without the necessary financial support, studying for the exams would have been an impractical task. After completing their studies, candidates also had to pay for travel and lodging expenses, not to mention thank-you gifts for the examiners and tips for the staff. A jinshi candidate required someone in the bureaucracy to act as his patron to vouch for his integrity. Banquets and entertainment also had to be paid for. As a result of these expenses, the nurturing of a candidate was a common burden for the whole family.

=== Procedures ===
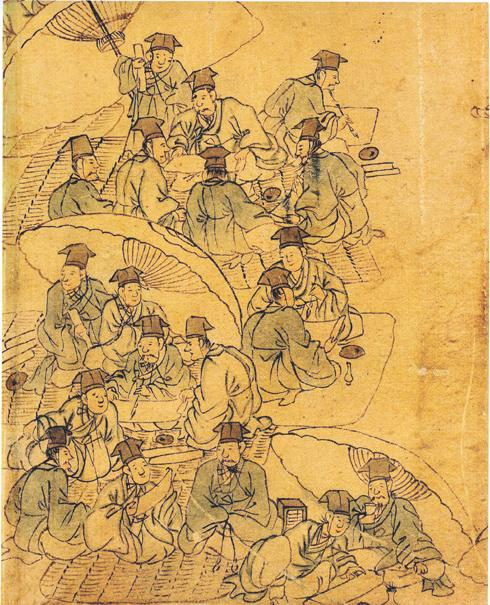
Korean candidates at the testing ground, Joseon, 18th century

Each candidate arrived at an examination compound with only a few amenities: a water pitcher, a chamber pot, bedding, food (prepared by the examinee), an inkstone, ink and brushes. Guards verified a student's identity and searched him for hidden texts such as cheat sheets. The facilities provided for the examinee consisted of an isolated room or cell with a makeshift bed, desk, and bench. Each examinee was assigned to a cell according to a pre-determined system numbered by the Heavenly Stems and Earthly Branches. Paper was provided by the examiners and stamped with an official seal. The examinees of the Ming and Qing periods could take up to three days and two nights writing "eight-legged essays"—literary compositions with eight distinct sections. Interruptions and outside communication were forbidden for the duration of the exam. If a candidate died, officials wrapped his body in a straw mat and tossed it over the high walls that ringed the compound.

At the end of the examination, answer sheets were processed by the sealing office. The Ming-era The Book of Swindles (c. 1617) contains an entire section of stories about "Corruption in Education", most of which involve swindlers exploiting exam-takers' desperate attempts to bribe the examiner. Exact quotes from the classics were required; misquoting even one character or writing it in the wrong form meant failure, so candidates went to great lengths to bring hidden copies of these texts with them, sometimes written on their underwear. The Minneapolis Institute of Arts holds an example of a Qing dynasty cheatsheet, a handkerchief with 10,000 characters of Confucian classics in microscopically small handwriting.

To prevent cheating, the sealing office erased any information about the candidate found on the paper and assigned a number to each candidate's papers. People in the copy office then recopied the entire text three times so that the examiners would not be able to identify the author. The first review was carried out by an examining official, and the papers were then handed over to a secondary examining official and to an examiner, either the chief examiner or one of several vice examiners. Judgments by the first and second examining official were checked again by a determining official, who fixed the final grade. Working with the team of examiners were a legion of gate supervisors, registrars, sealers, copyists and specialist assessors of literature.

Pu Songling, a Qing dynasty satirist, described the "seven transformations of the candidate":

When he first enters the examination compound and walks along, panting under his heavy load of luggage, he is just like a beggar. Next, while undergoing the personal body search and being scolded by the clerks and shouted at by the soldiers, he is just like a prisoner. When he finally enters his cell and, along with the other candidates, stretches his neck to peer out, he is just like the larva of a bee. When the examination is finished at last and he leaves, his mind in a haze and his legs tottering, he is just like a sick bird that has been released from a cage. While he is wondering when the results will be announced and waiting to learn whether he passed or failed, so nervous that he is startled even by the rustling of the trees and the grass and is unable to sit or stand still, his restlessness is like that of a monkey on a leash. When at last the results are announced and he has definitely failed, he loses his vitality like one dead, rolls over on his side, and lies there without moving, like a poisoned fly. Then, when he pulls himself together and stands up, he is provoked by every sight and sound, gradually flings away everything within his reach, and complains of the illiteracy of the examiners. When he calms down at last, he finds everything in the room broken. At this time he is like a pigeon smashing its own precious eggs. These are the seven transformations of a candidate.

— Pu Songling (1640–1715), who never passed the provincial examination

=== Ceremonies ===
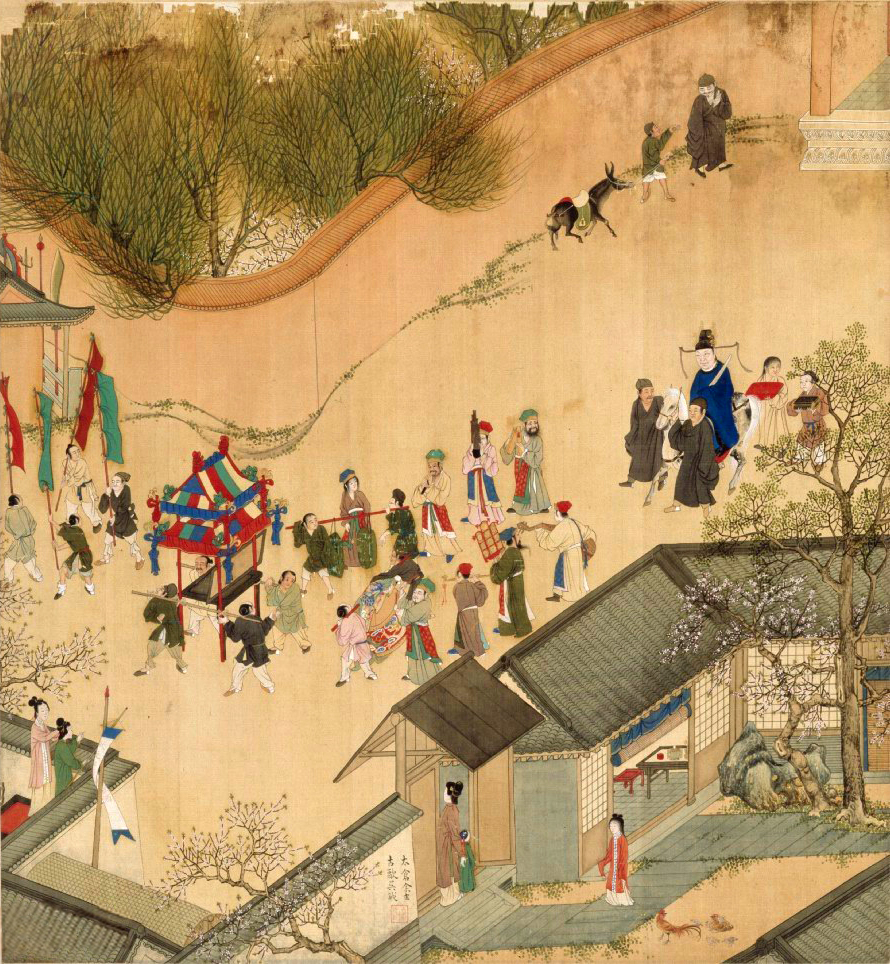
Celebration held for Xu Xianqing (pictured wearing the characteristic blue lanshan robes and Jinshi Guan of graduates), in Jinshi graduation ceremony called "Enrong Banquet" (Chinese: 恩荣宴)

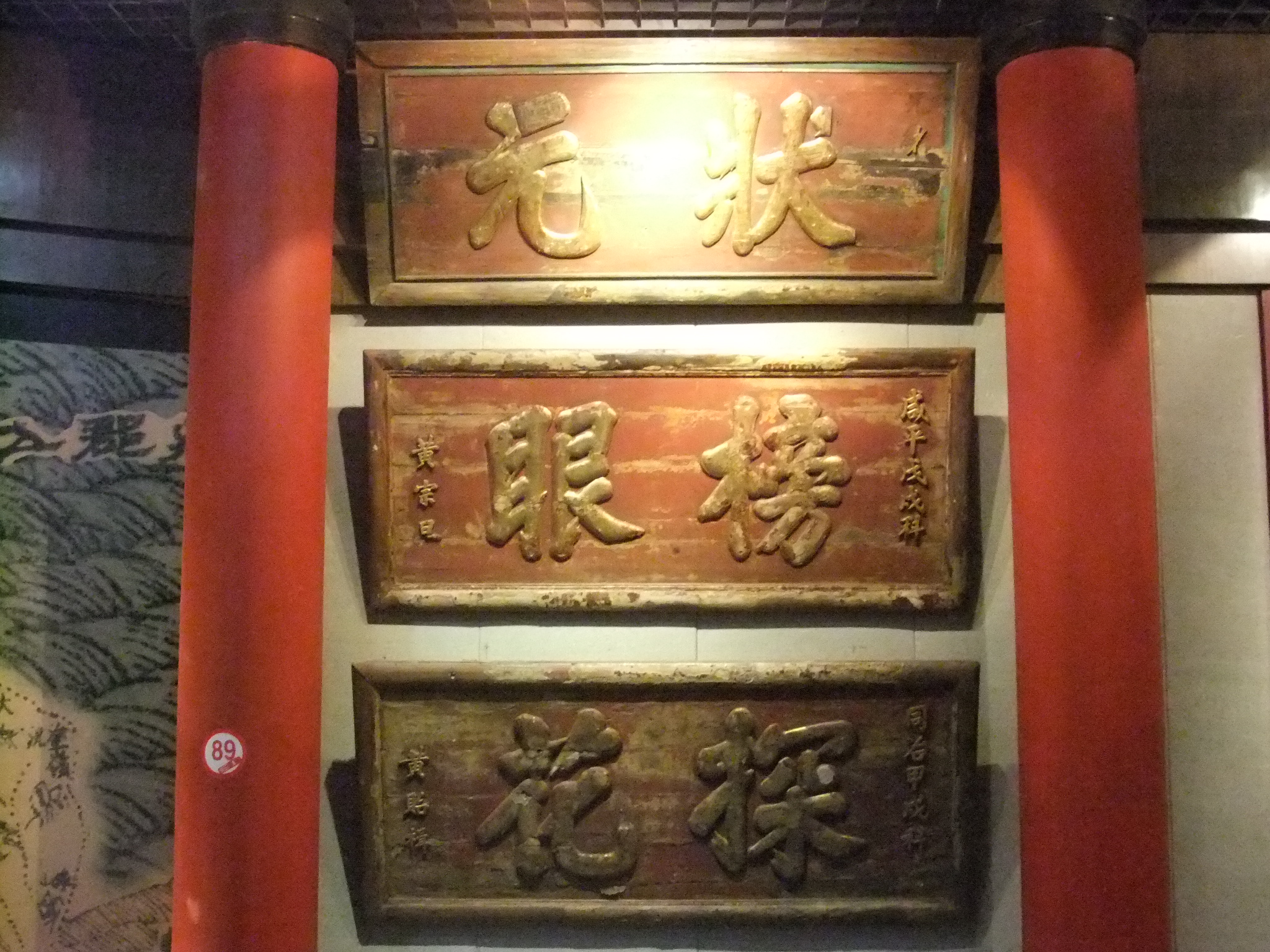
Title boards of the imperial exam winners: zhuangyuan 狀元 (1st place), bangyan 榜眼 (2nd), tanhua 探花 (3rd). Qing dynasty.

The middle of the stairs of the main hall of the imperial palace during the Tang and Song dynasties were carved with an image of the mythical turtle Ao (鼇). When the list of successful candidates of the palace examination was published, all the names of the graduates were read aloud in the presence of the emperor, and recorded in the archival documents of the dynasty. Graduates were given a green gown, a tablet as a symbol of status, and boots. The first ranked scholar received the title of Zhuàngyuán (狀元) and stood in the middle of the stairs on the carving of Ao. This gave rise to the phrase "to have seized Ao's head" (占鼇頭 zhàn ào tóu), or "to have alone seized Ao's head" (獨占鼇頭 dú zhàn àotóu) to describe a Zhuàngyuán, and more generally to refer to someone who excels in a certain field.

Once a scholar rides in a high carriage drawn by four horses, flagbearers in front, and a mounted escort forming the rear, people would gather on both sides of the road to watch and sigh. Ordinary men and stupid women rush forward in excitement and humble themselves by prostrating themselves in the dust stirred up by the carriage and the horses. This is the elation for a scholar when his ambition is fulfilled.

— Ouyang Xiu (1007–1072) describing the scene of a successful candidate returning home

=== Privileges ===
Shengyuan degree holders were given some general tax exemptions. Metropolitan exam graduates were allowed to buy themselves free of exile in cases of crime and to decrease the number of blows with the stick for a fee. Other than the title of jinshi, graduates of the palace examination were also exempted from all taxes and corvée labour.

== Post-examination appointments ==
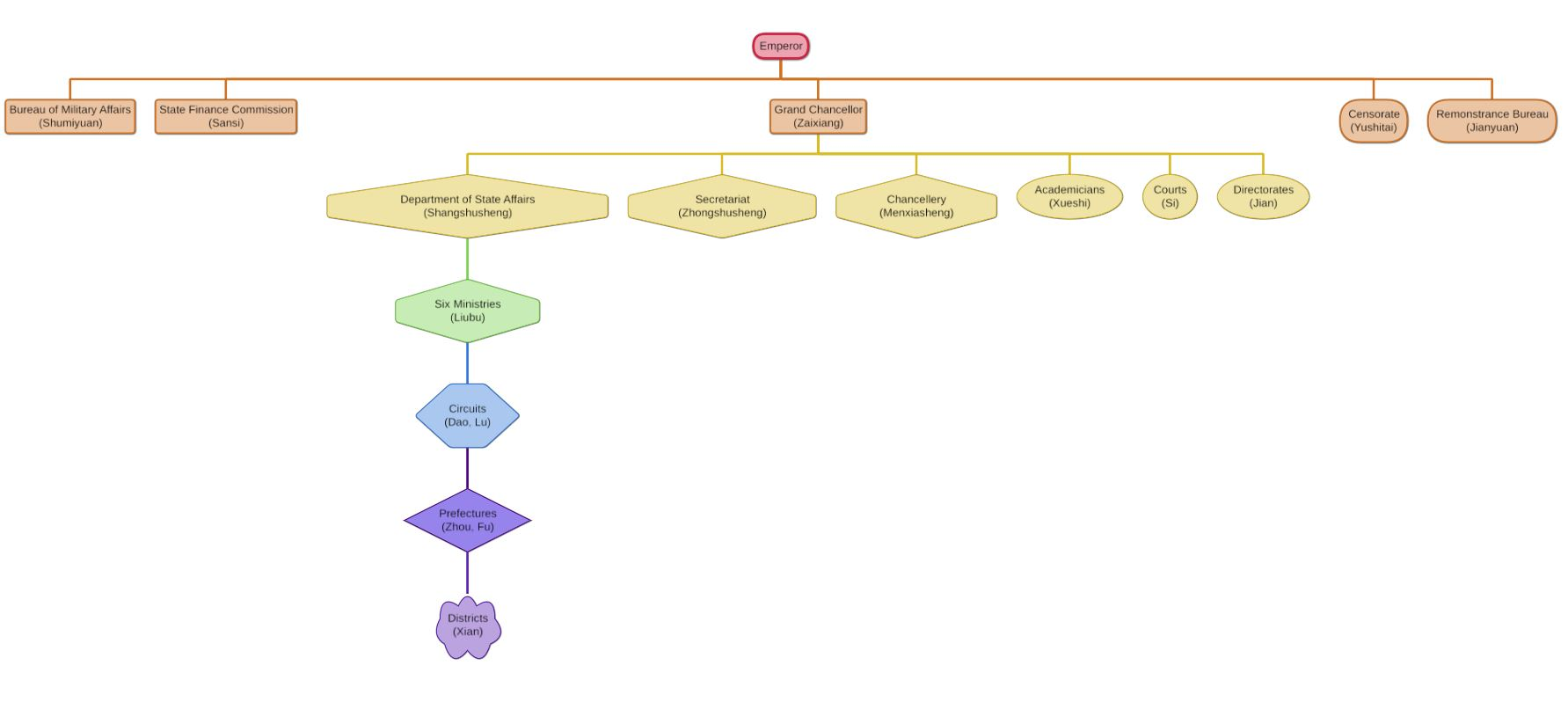
Song-dynasty government hierarchy

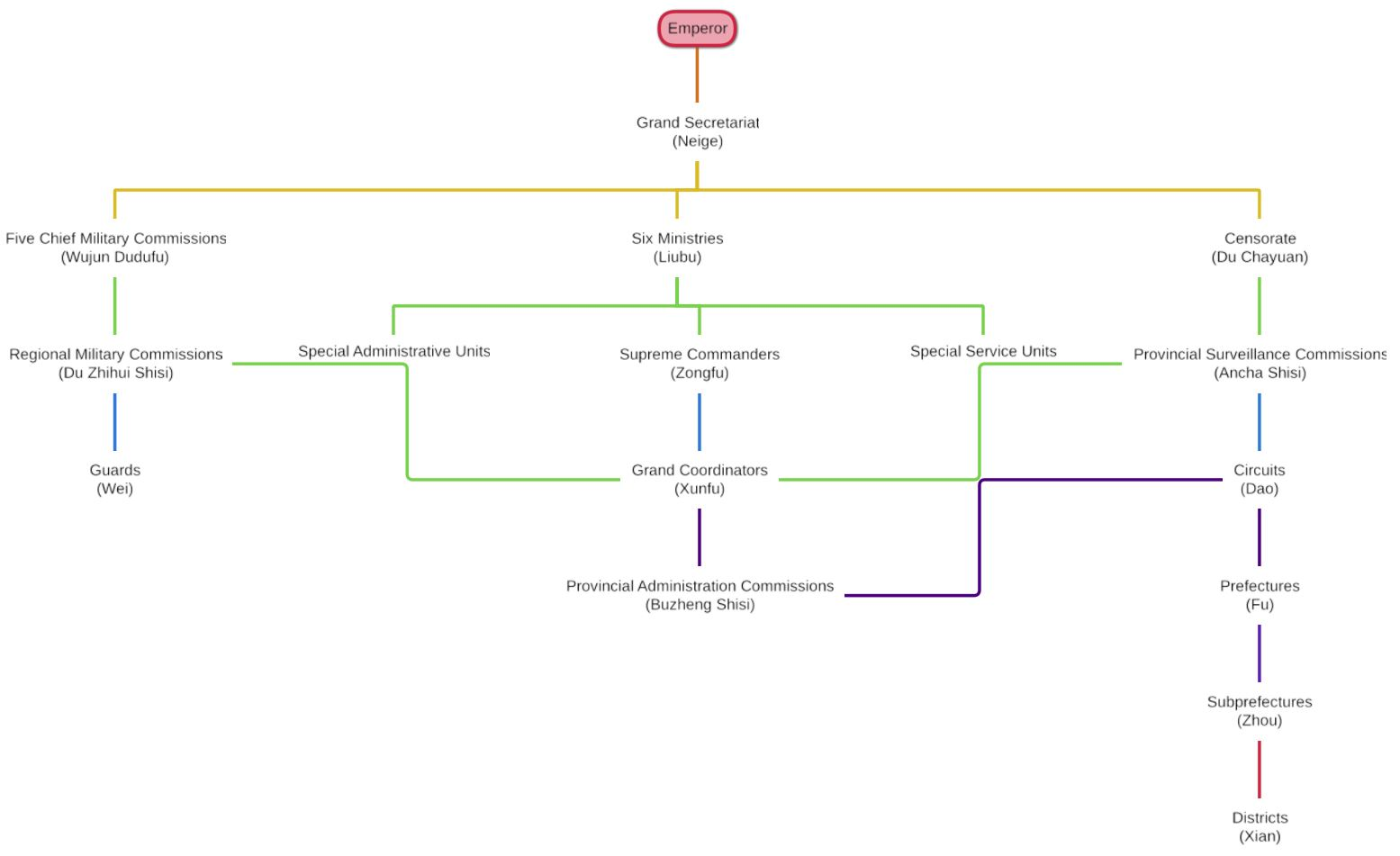
Ming-dynasty government hierarchy

Graduates of the prefectural examination qualified for employment as teachers in local or family schools, as administrators of granaries or temples, and as subofficial local administrators. The top three graduates of the palace examinations were directly appointed to the Hanlin Academy. Lower ranked graduates could be appointed to offices like Hanlin bachelor, secretaries, messengers in the Ministry of Rites, case reviewers, erudites, prefectural judges, prefects or county magistrates (zhixian 知縣).

During the Tang dynasty, successful candidates reported to the Ministry of Personnel for placement examinations. Unassigned officials and honorary title holders were expected to take placement examinations at regular intervals. Non-assigned status could last a very long time especially when waiting for a substantive appointment. After being assigned to office, a junior official was given an annual merit rating. There was no specified term limit, but most junior officials served for at least three years or more in one post. Senior officials served indefinitely at the pleasure of the emperor.

In the Song dynasty, successful candidates were appointed to office almost immediately and waiting periods between appointments were not long. Between 60 and 80 percent of the civil service was composed of low-ranking officials. They all started their careers in counties not in their home prefecture. These assignments lasted three to four years before they were reassigned to another locality and position. Annual merit ratings were still taken but officials could request evaluation for reassignment. Officials who wished to escape harsh assignments often requested reassignment as a state supervisor of a Taoist temple or monastery. Senior officials in the capital also sometimes nominated themselves for the position of prefect in obscure prefectures.

In addition to an obvious thinning of the numbers as one progresses into the upper ranks, the numbers also reveal important divisions between groups in the middle ranges of the administrative class. The distinct bulge in the court official group (grades twenty-five through twenty-three), with a total of 1,091 officials, the largest of any group, reveals the real promotion barrier between grades twenty-three and twenty-two. The wide disparity between directors (grades nineteen through fifteen) with a total of 160 officials and vice directors (grades twenty-two through twenty) with 619 officials also reveals the importance and the difficulty of promotion above grade twenty. These patterns formed because as early as 1066 the state effectively placed quotas on the number of officials who could be appointed to each group. Promotion across these major boundaries into the above group thus became more difficult.

— Charles Hartman

Recruitment by examination during the Yuan dynasty constituted a very minor part of the Yuan administration. Hereditary Mongol nobility formed the elite nucleus of the government. Initially the Mongols drew administrators from their subjects. In 1261, Kublai Khan ordered the establishment of Mongolian schools to draw officials from. The School for the Sons of the State was established in 1271 to give two or three years of training for the sons of the Imperial Bodyguards so that they might become suitable for official recruitment.

Recruitment by examination flourished after 1384 in the Ming dynasty. Provincial graduates were sometimes appointed to low-ranking offices or entered the Guozijian for further training, after which they might be considered for better appointments. Before appointment to office, metropolitan graduates were assigned to observe the functions of an office for up to one year. The maximum tenure for an office was nine years, but triennial evaluations were also taken, at which point an official could be reassigned. Magistrates of districts submitted monthly evaluation reports to their prefects and the prefects submitted annual evaluations to provincial authorities. Every third year, provincial authorities submitted evaluations to the central government, at which point an "outer evaluation" was conducted, requiring local administration to send representatives to attend a grand audience at the capital. Officials at the capital conducted an evaluation every six years. Capital officials of rank 4 and above were exempted from regular evaluations. Irregular evaluations were conducted by censorial officials.

Graduates of the metropolitan examination during the Qing dynasty were assured influential posts in the officialdom. The Ministry of Personnel submitted a list of nominees to the emperor, who then decided all major appointments in the capital and in the provinces in consultation with the Grand Council. Appointments were generally on a three-year basis with an evaluation at the end and the option for renewal. Officials rank three and above were personally evaluated by the emperor. Due to a population boom in the early modern era, qualified men far exceeded vacancies in the bureaucracy so that many waited for years between active duty assignments. Purchase of office became a common practice during the 19th century since it was very hard for qualified men to be appointed to one of the very limited number of posts. Even receiving empty titles with no active assignment required a monetary contribution.

== Institutions ==
A lecture hall in the Guozijian of Beijing

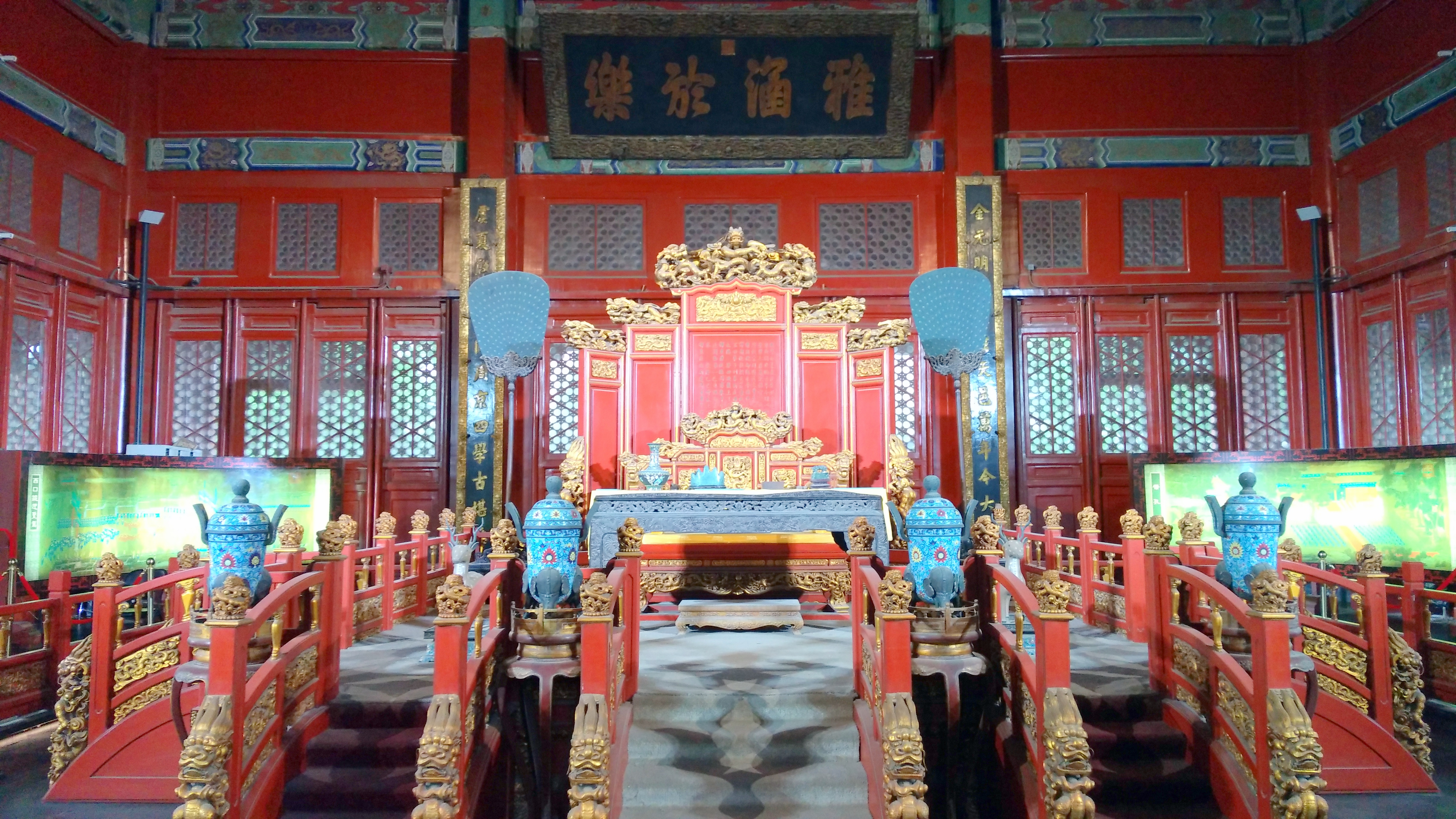
Interior seat at the lecture hall

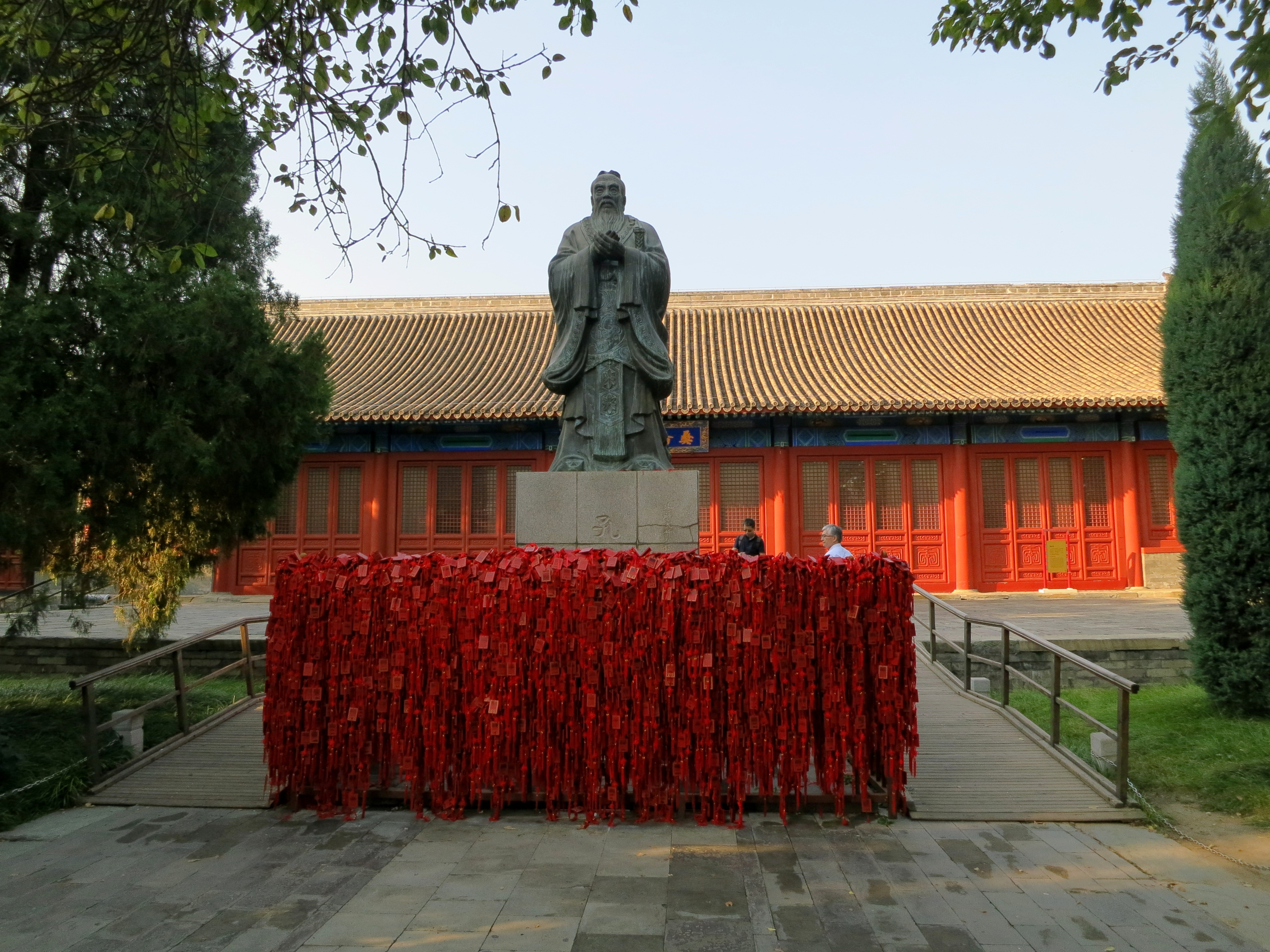
Prayers hung below a statue of Confucius at the Guozijian

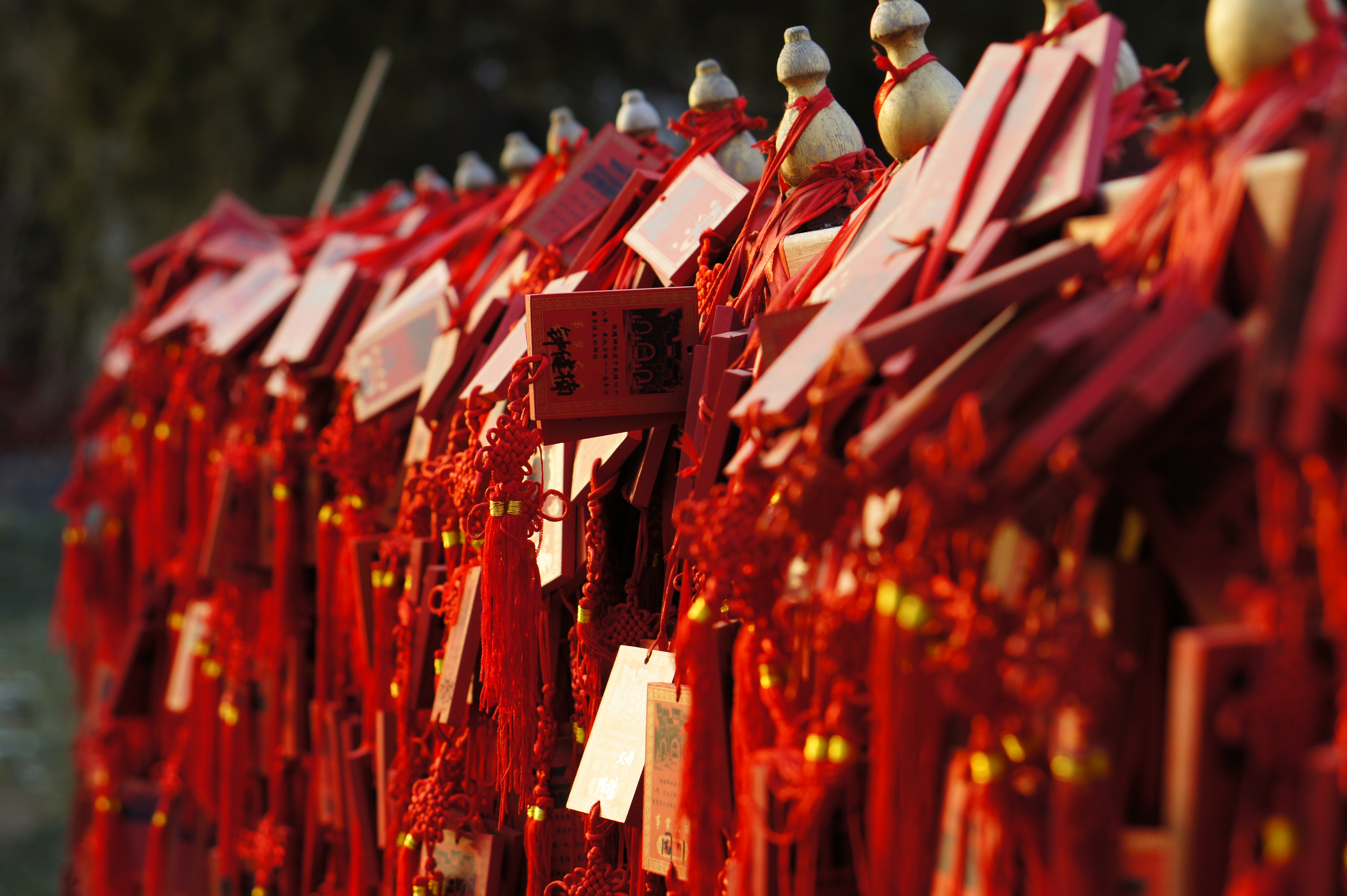
Prayers hung below the Confucius statue

=== Ministry of Rites ===
The Ministry of Rites, under the Department of State Affairs, was responsible for organizing and carrying out the imperial examinations.

=== Hanlin Academy ===
The Hanlin Academy was an institution created during the reign of Emperor Xuanzong of Tang (r. 712–755). It was located directly in the palace compound and staffed by officials who drafted official documents such as edicts. These officials, commonly appointed from the top three ranks of the palace examination graduates, came to be known as academicians (xueshi) after 738, when a new building was constructed to provide them living quarters. The title "academician" was not only for the staff of the Hanlin Academy, but any special assignment to special posts. The number of academicians in the Hanlin Academy was fixed to six at a later date and they were given the task of doing paperwork and consulting the emperor. The Hanlin Academy drafted documents about the appointment and dismissal of high ministers, proclamation of amnesties, and imperial military commands. It also aided the emperor in reading documents.

The number of Hanlin academicians was reduced to two during the Song dynasty. During the Yuan dynasty, a Hanlin Academy just for Mongols was created to translate documents. More emphasis was put on the oversight of imperial publications such as dynastic histories.

In the Qing dynasty, the number of posts in the Hanlin Academy increased immensely and a Manchu official was installed at all times. The posts became purely honorary and the institution was reduced to just another stepping stone for persons seeking higher positions in the government. Lower officials in the Hanlin Academy often had other posts at the same time.

=== Taixue ===
The Taixue (National University) was the highest educational institution in imperial China. During the reign of Emperor Wu of Han (r. 141–87 BC), Confucianism was adopted as the state doctrine. The Confucian scholar Dong Zhongshu suggested establishing a National University (Taixue) in the capital, Chang'an, so that erudites could teach the Classics. Teaching at the Taixue was a prestigious job because the emperor commonly picked from among them for appointment in high offices. At first the Taixue had only 50 students but increased to around 3,000 by the end of the millennium. Under the reign of Wang Mang (r. 9–23 AD), two other educational institutions called the Biyong and Mingtang were established south of the city walls, each able to house 10,000 students. The professors and students were able to exercise some political power by criticizing their opponents such as governors and eunuchs. This eventually led to the arrest of more than 1,000 professors and students by the eunuchs.

After the collapse of the Han dynasty, the Taixue was reduced to just 19 teaching positions and 1,000 students but climbed back to 7,000 students under the Jin dynasty (266–420). After the nine rank system was introduced, a "Directorate of Education" (Guozijian) was created for persons rank five and above, effectively making it the educational institution for nobles, while the Taixue was relegated to teaching commoners. Over the next two centuries, the Guozijian became the primary educational institute in the Southern Dynasties. The Sixteen Kingdoms and Northern Dynasties also created their own schools but they were only available for sons and relatives of high officials. The Northern Wei dynasty founded the Primary School of Four Gates.

During the Sui dynasty, a Law School, Arithmetics School, and Calligraphy School were put under the administration of the Guozijian. These schools accepted the relatives of officials rank eight and below while the Taixue, Guozijian, and Four Gates School served higher ranks. By the start of the Tang dynasty (618–907), 300 students were enrolled in the Guozijian, 500 at the Taixue, 1,300 at the Four Gates School, 50 at the Law School, and a mere 30 at the Calligraphy and Arithmetics Schools. Emperor Gaozong of Tang (r. 649–683), founded a second Guozijian in Luoyang. The average age of admission was 14 to 19 but 18 to 25 for the Law School. Students of these institutions who applied for the state examinations had their names transmitted to the Ministry of Rites, which was also responsible for their appointment to a government post.

During the Song dynasty, Emperor Renzong of Song founded a new Taixue at Kaifeng with 200 students enrolled. Emperor Shenzong of Song (r. 1067–1085) raised the number of students to 2,400. He also implemented the "three-colleges law" (sanshefa 三舍法) in 1079, which divided the Taixue into three colleges. Under the three-colleges law, students first attended the Outer College, then the Inner College, and finally the Superior College. One of the aims of the three colleges was to provide a more balanced education for students and to de-emphasize Confucian learning. Students were taught in only one of the Confucian classics, depending on the college, as well as arithmetics and medicine. Students of the Outer College who passed a public and institutional examination were allowed to enter the Inner College. At the Inner College there were two exams over a two-year period on which the students were graded. Those who achieved the superior grade on both exams were directly appointed to office equal to that of a metropolitan exam graduate. Those who achieved an excellent grade on one exam but slightly worse on the other could still be considered for promotion, and having a good grade in one exam but mediocre in another still awarded merit equal to that of a provincial exam graduate.

Since the court ordered the erection of countrywide schools in the Qingli era, prefectures and counties had their own school campuses, fields and hostels. The Directorate of Education in the capital was also split to establish the Imperial University. Usually a few hundred students attend the Imperial University, while the number of students in the prefectural school have nearly reached a hundred. Such flourishing schools were reminiscent of the preceding Han and Tang dynasties. Nevertheless, our country does not have a selection mechanism through schools. I sincerely hope that those prefectural officials in service for over a year could nominate students of extraordinary talent and conduct for promotion to the Imperial University. When students are judged to be of insufficient merit, no nomination shall be made. After these students have registered at the Imperial University, the government should provide daily and monthly stipends, while closely observing and frequently evaluating their conduct and ability. Every year, the directorate supervisor and lecturers shall nominate ten candidates. After examination by the court, those selected candidates would be conferred the advanced scholar degree using the degree quota. For the scions of high officials as well as existing students, admissions should be sought in other ways.

— Sun Jue, a student writing in 1068

In 1104, the prefectural examinations were abolished in favor of the three-colleges system, which required each prefecture to send an annual quota of students to the Taixue. This drew criticism from some officials who claimed that the new system benefited the rich and young, and was less fair because the relatives of officials could enroll without being examined for their skills. In 1121, the local three-college system was abolished but retained at the national level. For a time, the national examination system was also abandoned in favor of directly appointing students of the Taixue to government posts. The Taixue itself did not survive the demise of the Song dynasty and ceased to exist afterwards, becoming a synonym for the Guozijian.

=== Guozijian ===
The Guozijian (Directorate of Education) was founded under Emperor Wu of Jin (r. 265–289) to educate the nobility. Under the Song dynasty, the Guozijian became the central administrative institution for all state schools throughout the empire. Among its duties were the maintenance of the buildings, the construction of new facilities, and the promotion of students. The Guozijian itself was equipped with a library and printing shop to create model printing blocks for distribution. The Guozijian was abolished in 1907.

== Organization ==
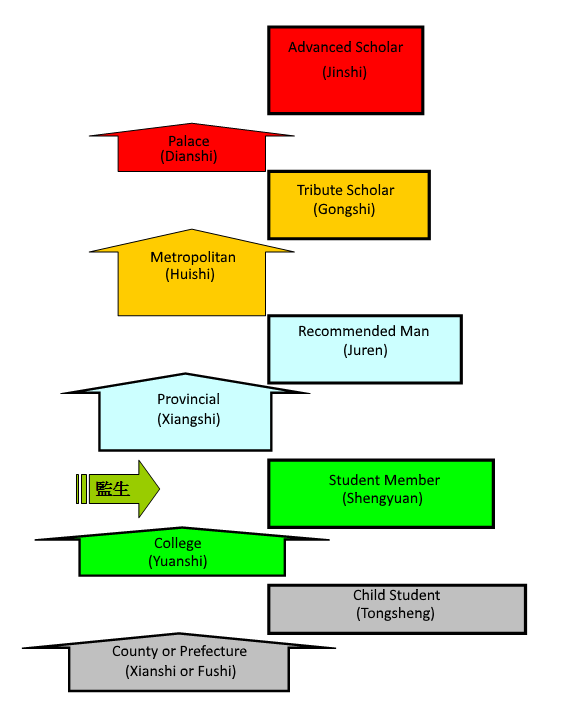
The imperial examination hierarchy

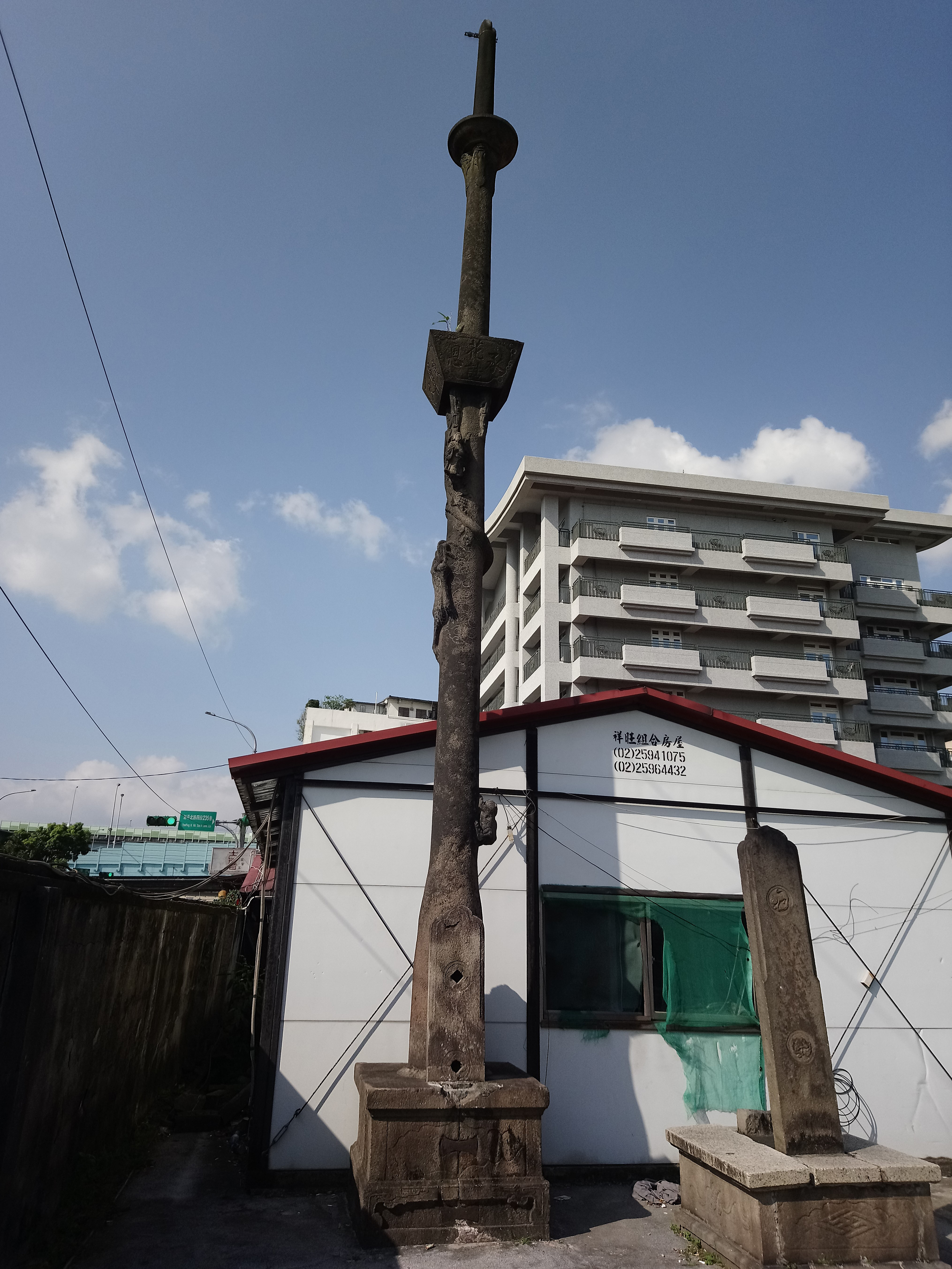
Stone pole planted at a scholar's abode indicating the juren imperial examination status

The examinations were given a formal structure and tier system during the Song dynasty but the exact number of tiers, their titles, degrees awarded, and names differed depending on era and dynasty. Sometimes examinations of the same tier from different dynasties had different names. For example, the palace examination was called dianshi or yushi during the Song, but tingshi in the Ming, while the metropolitan examination was shengshi in the Song and huishi in the Jin, Yuan, and Ming. In other cases, examinations of different tiers used the same name. Fushi in the Liao meant prefectural examination but provincial examination in the Jin. The lowest tier examinations were usually held annually while higher tier examinations held triennially.

Examination hierarchy by dynasty
Song	Liao	Jin	Yuan	Ming	Qing
Palace	Palace	Metropolitan	Palace	Palace	Palace
Metropolitan	Metropolitan	Provincial	Metropolitan	Metropolitan	Metropolitan
Prefectural	Prefectural	Prefectural	Provincial	Provincial	Provincial
	Township				Apprentice

- Entry-level examinations (collectively known as tóngshēngshì (童生试) or simply tóngshì (童试); lit. "child examinations"): held every year locally and accessible to educated individuals from their early teenage years. The examinations were broken down hierarchically into: xiànshì (縣試, lit. "county examination"), fǔshì (府試, lit. "prefectural examination") and yuànshì (院試, lit. "college/academy examination").
- Provincial examination (called xiāngshì (鄉試) and fǔshì (府試); lit. "countryside/hometown examination" and "prefectural examination"): held every three years in provincial capitals.
- Metropolitan examination (called huìshì (會試), shěngshì (省試) and lǐbùshì (禮部試); lit. "metropolitan examination", "department examination" and "ministry of rites examination"): held every three years in the national capital.
- Palace examination (called diànshì (殿試), yùshì (御試) and tíngshì (廷試); lit. "hall examination", "imperial/government examination" and "courtyard examination"): held every three years in the imperial palace and often supervised by the emperor himself.

=== Degree types ===
By the Ming dynasty, the examinations and degrees formed a "ladder of success", with success generally being equated with graduating as jinshi, a degree similar to a modern PhD. Modifications to the basic jinshi or other degrees were made for higher-placing graduates, similar to the modern latin honors. The examination process extended down to the county level, and included examinations at the provincial and metropolitan levels. The highest level examination would be at the palace level, with successful candidates being known as jinshi. Special purpose exams were occasionally offered by imperial decree.

- Tongsheng (童生, lit. "child student"), an examinee who had passed the county/prefecture examination of the entry-level examinations.
- Shengyuan (生員, lit. "student member"), commonly called xiucai (秀才, lit. "outstanding talent"), a scholar who had passed the academy examination of the entry-level examinations. Xiucai enjoyed officially sanctioned social privileges such as exemption from statute labour, access into local government facilities and limited immunity against corporal punishments. They were further divided into three classes according to their performance in the examination.
  - Linsheng (廩生, lit. "granary student"), the first class of shengyuan, who were the best performers in the academy examination, and got to receive government-issued rations and pay for their achievements. The top performers within this class would get accepted into the Imperial Academy as gongsheng (貢生, lit. "tribute/selected student"), and will then sit the provincial examination or even be eligible for the metropolitan examination directly.
    - Anshou (案首, lit. "first desk"), the highest ranking linsheng, and thus the top shengyuan who ranked first in the academy examination.
  - Zengsheng (增生, lit. "gained student"), the second class of shengyuan, who performed less well than linsheng and enjoyed similar legal perks, but not the material rewards.
  - Fusheng (附生, lit. "attached student"), the third class of shengyuan and considered substitute recruits outside the official quota of enrollment. They were considered passable examinees but needed more improvements.
- Juren (舉人, lit. "recommended man"), a scholar who passed the triennial provincial examination.
  - Jieyuan (解元, lit. "foremost among present scholars"), the juren who ranked first in the provincial examination.
- Gongshi (貢士, lit. "tribute scholar"), a scholar who passed the triennial metropolitan examination.
  - Huiyuan (會元, lit. "top conference examinee"), the gongshi who ranked first in the metropolitan examination.
- Jinshi (進士, lit. "advanced scholar"), a scholar who passed the triennial palace examination.
  - Jinshi jidi (進士及第, lit. "distinguished advanced scholar"), the first class in the palace examination, usually only the top three individuals were qualified for this title.
    - Zhuangyuan (狀元, lit. "top thesis author"), the jinshi who ranked first overall.
    - Bangyan (榜眼, lit. "eyes positioned alongside"), the jinshi who ranked second overall.
    - Tanhua (探花, lit. "flower snatcher"), the jinshi who ranked third overall.
  - Jinshi chushen (進士出身, lit. "advanced scholar background"), the second class in the palace examination, ranking immediately after the tanhua.
  - Tong jinshi chushen (同進士出身, lit. "along with advanced scholar background"), the third class in the palace examination.

== Other examinations ==
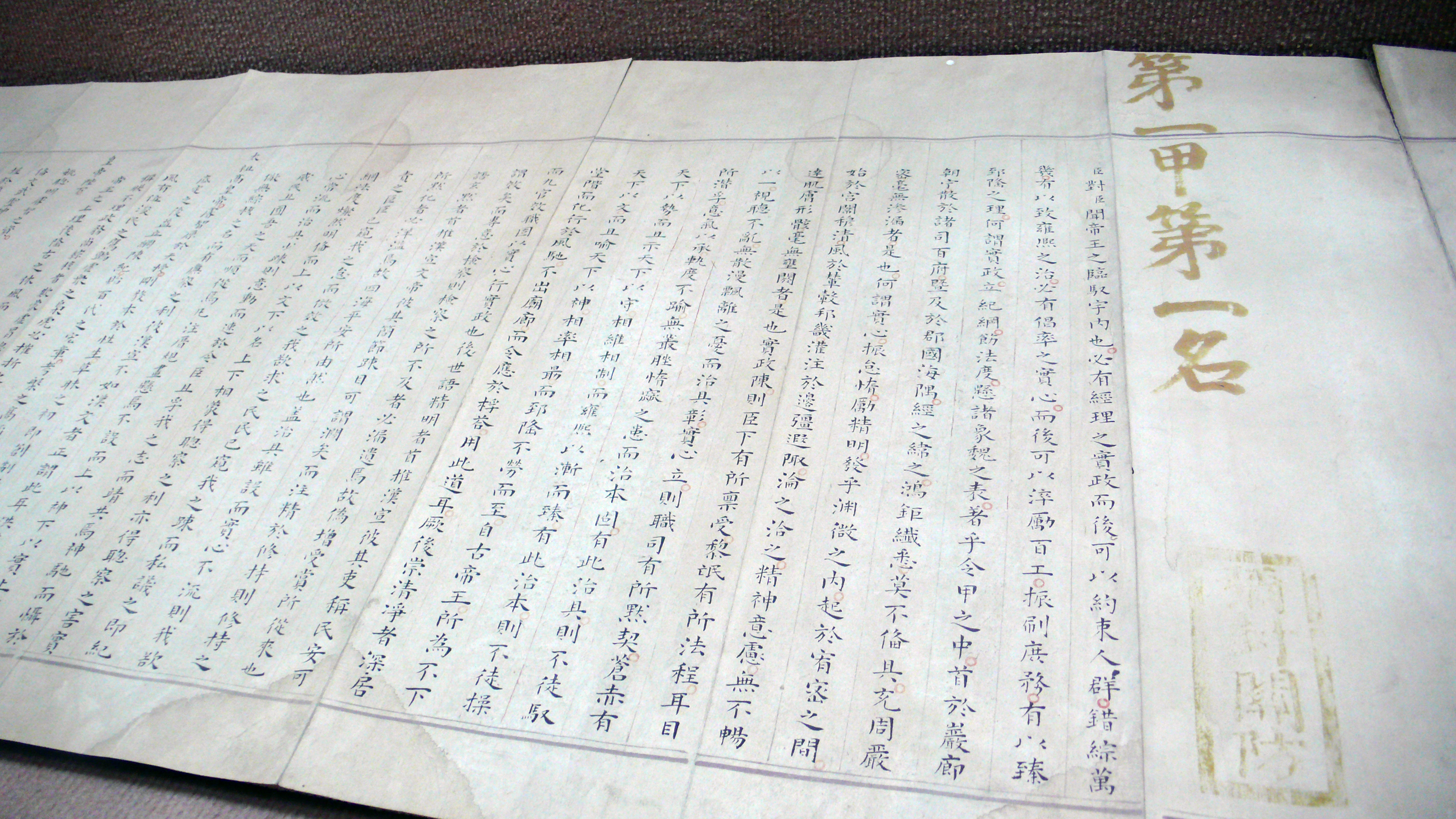
Exam paper of Ming dynasty Zhuangyuan Zhao Bing-zhong in 1598 AD

=== Classicist ===
The classicist (mingjing) originated as a category for recruitment by local authorities to the appointment of state offices. The term was created during the Han dynasty under Emperor Wu of Han for candidates eligible for official appointment or for enrolment in the Taixue. Classicists were expected to be familiar with the Confucian canon and the Taoist text Laozi. The classicist category fell out of use under Cao Wei and the Jin dynasty but was revived during the Southern Dynasties for filling places in the Taixue.

During the Sui dynasty, examinations for classicists and cultivated talents were introduced. Unlike cultivated talents, classicists were only tested on the Confucian canon, which was considered an easy task at the time, so those who passed were awarded posts in the lower rungs of officialdom. Classicists were tested by being presented phrases from the classic texts. They then had to write the whole paragraph to complete the phrase. If the examinee was able to correctly answer five of ten questions, they passed. This was considered such an easy task that a 30-year-old candidate was said to be old for a classicist examinee, but young to be a jinshi. An oral version of the classicist examination known as moyi also existed but consisted of 100 questions rather than just ten. In contrast, the jinshi examination tested not only the Confucian classics, but also history, proficiency in compiling official documents, inscriptions, discursive treatises, memorials, and poems and rhapsodies. In 742, Laozi was replaced in the examination by the glossary Erya. In 1071, Emperor Shenzong of Song (r. 1067–1085) abolished the classicist as well as various other examinations on law and arithmetics.

=== Cultivated talent ===
The cultivated talent (xiucai) originated in the Han dynasty when Emperor Wu of Han declared that each province had to present one cultivated talent per year to be appointed in the government. During the Sui dynasty, examinations for "cultivated talents" were introduced. They were tested on matters of statecraft and the Confucian canon. This type of examination was very limited in its implementation and there were only 11 or 12 graduates throughout its entire history. During the Song dynasty, cultivated talent became a general title for graduates of the state examinations.

=== Strategic questions ===
The strategic questions examination (cewen) was a question-and-answer type essay examination introduced during the Han dynasty. The purpose of the exam was to ensure examinees could apply Confucian doctrine to practical matters of statecraft. A question on a problematic political issue was asked and the examinee was expected to answer it according to his own opinion and how the issue could be resolved. The strategic questions examination became obsolete during the Ming dynasty due to the prevalence of the eight-legged essay.

=== Military ===
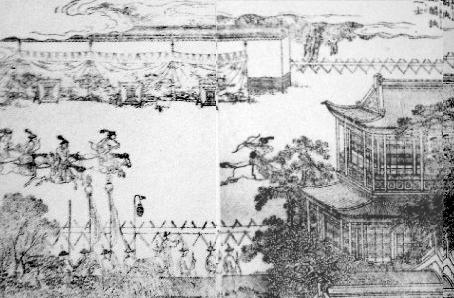
Military examinees being tested on mounted archery, Qing dynasty

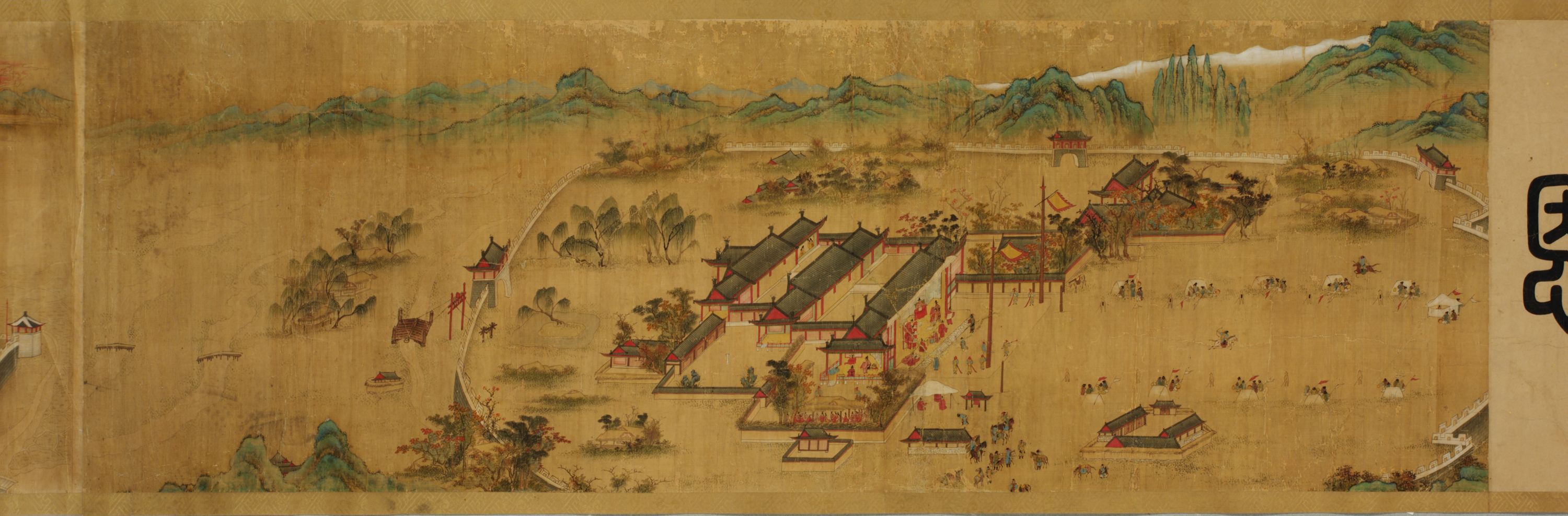
A military exam conducted in Joseon

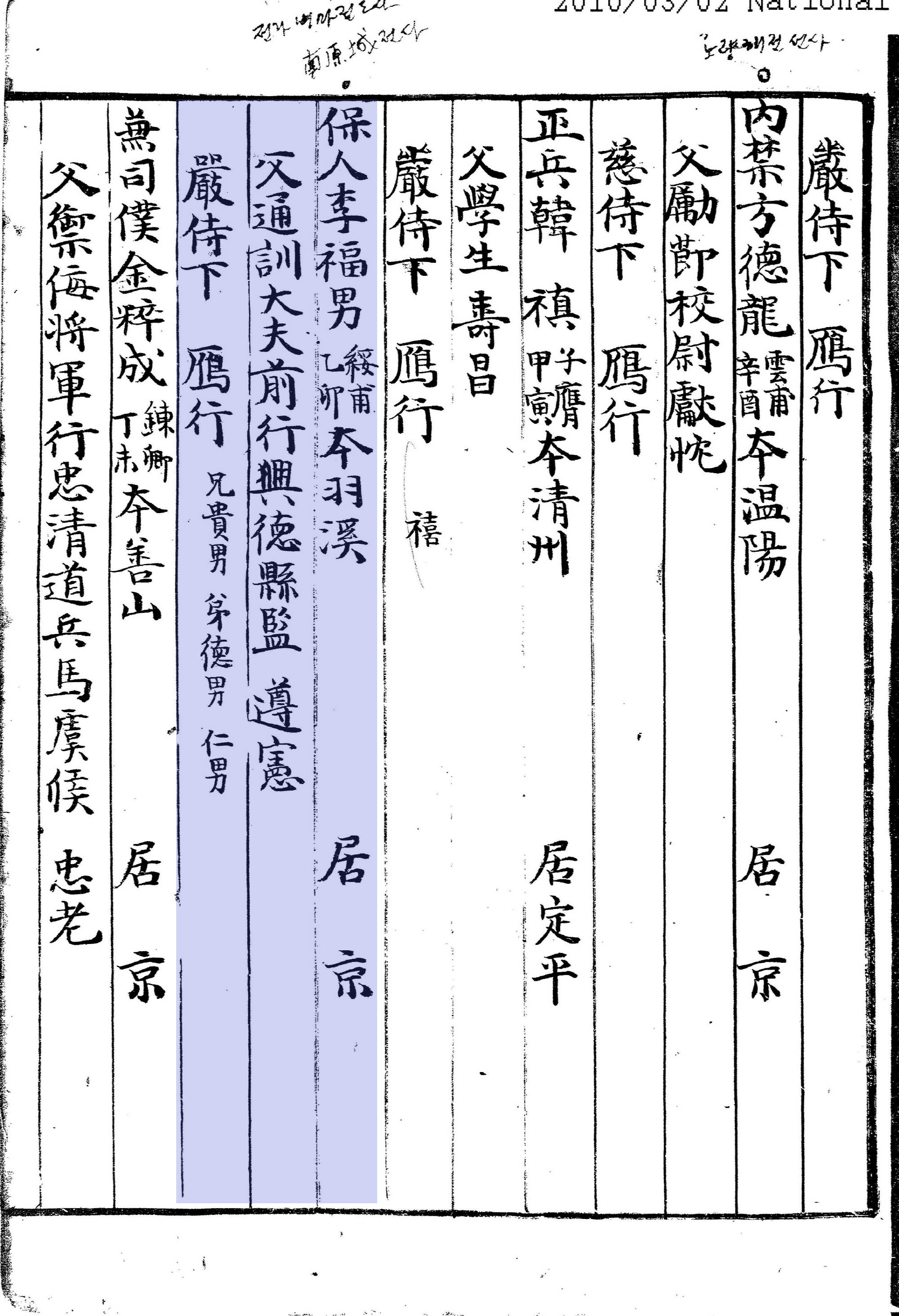
Military exam pass certificate, Joseon, 16 March 1588

During the reign of Wu Zetian the imperial government created military examinations for the selection of army officers as a response to the breakdown of garrison militias known as the Fubing system. The first formal military examinations (武舉 Wǔjǔ) were introduced in 702. The military examinations had the same general arrangement as the regular exams, with provincial, metropolitan and palace versions of the exams. Successful candidates were awarded military versions of Jinshi and Juren degrees: Wujinshi (武進士) and Wujuren (武舉人), and so on.

The military exam included both a written and physical portion. In theory, candidates were supposed to master not only the same Confucian texts as required by the civil exam, but also Chinese military texts such as The Art of War, in addition to martial skills such as archery and horsemanship. The district exam was conducted by the county magistrate and consisted of three sessions.

The first session tested mounted archery by having candidates shoot three arrows while riding a horse toward a target at a distance of 35 and 80 paces. The target was in the shape of a man 1.6 meters high. A perfect score was three hits, a good score two, and one hit earned a pass. Those who fell off their horse or failed to score even one hit were eliminated. The second session was held in a garden at the prefectural office. Candidates were ordered to shoot five arrows at a target at 50 paces. Again, five hits were graded excellent while one hit earned a pass. Next they had to bend a bow into the shape of a full moon. The bows were graded by strength into 72 kg, 60 kg, and 48 kg weapons. Bending a 72 kg bow was excellent while bending a 48 kg bow earned a pass. Then they were ordered to perform a number of exercises with a halberd without it touching the ground. The halberds were graded by weight from 72 kg to 48 kg, with the lowest-grade weapon earning a pass. For the final portion of the second session, candidates were required to lift a stone 35 cm off the ground. Lifting a 180 kg stone earned an excellent grade, a 150 kg stone good, and a 120 kg stone passing.

The third session involved writing out by memory entire portions of the Seven Military Classics, but only three of the classics were ever used, those being The Methods of the Sima, the Wuzi, and The Art of War. Even just memorizing the reduced portion of the classics was too difficult for most military examinees, who resorted to cheating and bringing with them miniature books to copy, a behavior the examiners let slide owing to the greater weighting of the first two sessions. In some cases the examinees still made mistakes while copying the text word for word. The contents of the military exam were largely the same at the prefectural, provincial, metropolitan, and palace levels, with the only difference being tougher grading.

Military degrees were considered inferior to civil degrees and did not carry the same prestige. The names of civil jinshi were carved in marble whereas military jinshi were not. While the military and civil services were imagined in Chinese political philosophy as the two wheels of a chariot, in practice, the military examination degree was highly regarded by neither the army or the world at large. Soldiers preferred not having military exam graduates as commanders whose skills in test taking did not necessarily transfer to the army. Final decision for appointment in the military still came down to forces outside the examination system. For example, at the beginning of 755, An Lushan replaced 32 Han Chinese commanders with his own barbarian favorites without any repercussions. During the Qing dynasty, the pre-existing institutions of the Eight Banners and Green Standard Army had their own rules for promotion and left little room for military exam graduates. Some of the few military examination graduates who did achieve distinction include the Tang general Guo Ziyi, the father of the founder of the Song dynasty Zhao Hongyin, Ming generals Yu Dayou and Qi Jiguang, and Ming general turned traitor Wu Sangui. However, these are but a minuscule number among those who passed the 282 military metropolitan exams held between their inception in 702 and abolishment in 1901. Even in desperate times of war, the majority of distinguished military figures in Chinese history have come from civil degree holders. The practices of the Ming and Qing military exams were incorporated into physical education in the Republic of China.

=== Translation ===
During the Qing dynasty, translation examinations were held for young men from the Eight Banners who held no military post. Manchus, Mongols and Chinese Bannermen were allowed to participate in the Manchu exam while the Mongolian exam was restricted to Mongol Bannermen. The examinees did not take the examinations expecting to become translators. The content of the exam consisted of material from the Manchu or Mongol versions of the Four Books and the Five Classics, while only a minor part of the exam consisted of translation from Chinese into Manchu or Mongolian. Three levels of the exam were implemented but there was no palace examination. The quota on the provincial level was 33 persons for the Manchu, and 9 for the Mongolian examination. The number of graduates declined to just 7 and 3 persons, respectively, in 1828, and 4 and 1 in 1837. In 1840 the Mongolian exam was abolished because there were only 6 candidates. Graduates of the metropolitan translation examination were all given the title of regular metropolitan translation graduate without further gradation or extraordinary designations. Excellent graduates of the Manchu exam were directly appointed secretaries in one of the Six Ministries while those of the Mongol one were commonly made officials in the Court of Colonial Affairs.

=== Special ===
Besides the regular tests for the jinshi and other degrees, there were also occasionally special purpose examinations, by imperial decree (zhiju). Decree examinations could be for a number of purposes such as identifying talent for specific assignments, or to satisfy particular interest groups such as ethnic groups and the imperial clan. In the Tang dynasty, the emperor held on occasion special examinations for specialized topics. These were open to persons already employed by the government. During the Song dynasty, in 1061, Emperor Renzong of Song decreed special examinations for the purpose of finding men capable of "direct speech and full remonstrance" (zhiyan jijian): the testing procedure required the examinees to submit 50 previously prepared essays, 25 on particular contemporary problems, 25 on more general historical governmental themes. In the examination room, the examinees then had a day to write essays on six topics chosen by the test officials, and finally were required to write a 3,000-character essay on a complex policy problem, personally chosen by the emperor, Renzong. Among the few successful candidates were the Su brothers, Su Shi and Su Zhe (who had already attained their jinshi degrees, in 1057), with Su Shi scoring exceptionally high in the examinations, and subsequently having copies of his examination essays widely circulated.

== Culture ==
=== Language ===
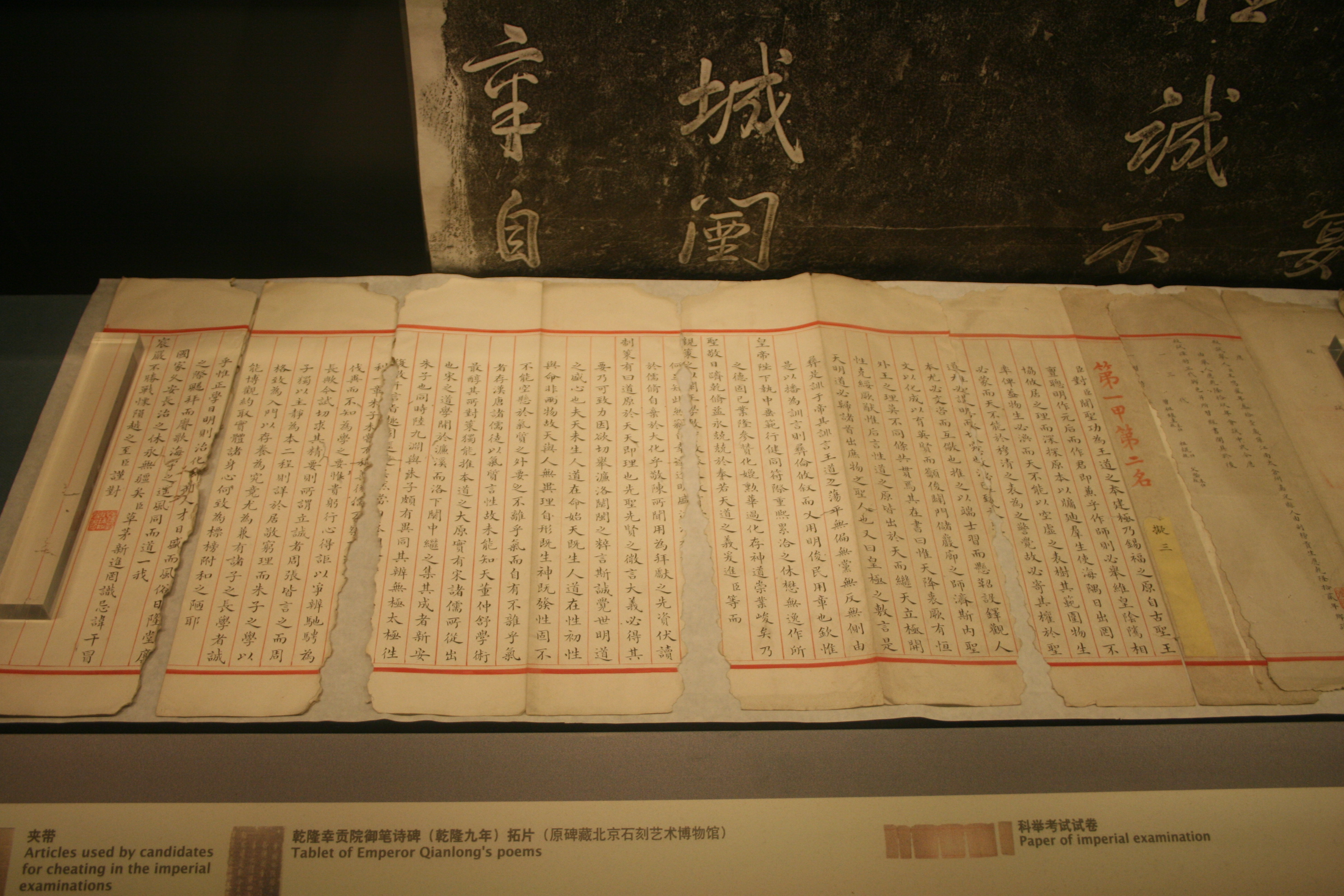
Examination paper written in regular script, Qing dynasty

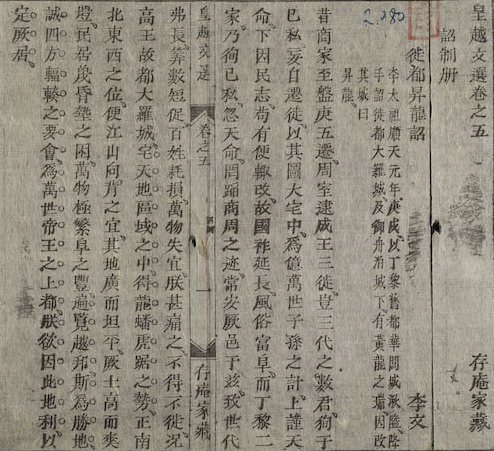
Edict on the Transfer of the Capital written in Classical Chinese by Lý Thái Tổ in 1010

All Chinese imperial examinations were written in Classical Chinese, also known as Literary Chinese, using the regular script (kaishu), which is today the most commonly seen calligraphic style in modern China. The importance of knowledge in Classical Chinese was retained in examination systems in other countries such as in Japan, Korea, and Vietnam, where candidates were required to be well versed in the Confucian classics, to be able to compose essays and poetry in Classical Chinese, and to be able to write in regular script. Owing to the examination system, Classical Chinese became a basic educational standard throughout these countries. Readers of Classical Chinese did not need to learn spoken Chinese to understand or read the text because of its logographic nature. Texts written in Classical Chinese could be "read and understood by any sufficiently literate person, even if a given text was ultimately voiced in Japanese, Korean, or Vietnamese and not mutually intelligible in speech". This shared textual tradition and common understanding of the Confucian canon allowed these countries to communicate with each other through "brush talk" in the absence of a common language.

In both Korea and Japan, forms of writing were developed to assist readers in understanding Classical Chinese. The Korean Gugyeol and Japanese Kanbun Kundoku writing systems modified the Chinese text with markers and annotations to represent their respective languages' pronunciation and grammatical order. While Chinese texts was glossed with Vietnamese giải âm. Chinese script was also adapted to write Korean and Japanese in their respective native word order. In Korea this was called the Idu script (official reading) and in Japan, Man'yōgana (ten thousand leaves). In Japan, Kanbun was used to write official documents from the 8th century until after World War 2. In Korea, the Idu script was used for writing official documents in the Korean language and the civil service examinations from their establishment in 958 to termination in 1894. The Korean examinations were also written in Classical Chinese. Vietnamese examinations used chữ Hán (Chinese characters), also called chữ Nho (Confucian script), which is virtually indistinguishable from Classical Chinese (Hán văn) in its written form, but uses Vietnamese pronunciations when read aloud. Hán văn was made the official writing system of Đại Việt in 1174 and remained the writing system of the administration until Vietnam was taken over by France in the 19th century. Similar to Korea and Japan, Vietnam also adapted Chinese script to write the Vietnamese language in what is known as chữ Nôm (southern characters).

Owing to the shared literary and philosophical traditions rooted in Confucian and Buddhist texts and the use of the same script, a large number of Chinese words were borrowed into Korean, Japanese, and Vietnamese (KJV). To prepare for the civil service exams, candidates mastered Chinese words through reciting the texts and composing prose and verses in Classical Chinese, so it is hardly surprising that they gradually added Chinese vocabulary to their native lexicon. In today's terms, these borrowed words are referred to as Sino-Korean, Sino-Japanese, and Sino-Vietnamese words, where the prefix "Sino-" refers to China. However, they have long been integrated into the vocabulary of the KJV languages so that native speakers may be oblivious of their Sinitic origin.

— Yu Li

=== Poetry ===
Some of the main outstanding questions regarding the imperial examinations are in regard to poetry. There is a long history of debate on the usefulness of the procedure of testing the ability of the candidates to write poetry. During the Tang dynasty, a poetry section was added to the examinations, requiring the examinee to compose a shi poem in the five-character, 12-line regulated verse form and a fu composition of 300 to 400 characters. The poetry requirement remained standard for many decades, despite some controversy, although briefly abolished for the examination year 833–34 (by order of Li Deyu). During the Song dynasty, in the late 1060s Wang Anshi removed the traditional poetry composition sections (regulated verse and fu), on the grounds of irrelevancy to the official functions of bureaucratic office: on the other side of the debate, Su Shi (Dongpo) pointed out that the selection of great ministers of the past had not been obstructed by the poetry requirements, that the study and practice of poetry encouraged careful writing, and that the evaluation and grading of poetry was more objective than for the prose essays, due to the strict and detailed rules for writing verse according to the formal requirements.

Starting from the Yuan dynasty, poetry was abolished as a subject in the examinations, being regarded as frivolous. This process was completed at the inception of the following Ming dynasty. It was revived in 1756 by the Qing dynasty.

=== Religion ===
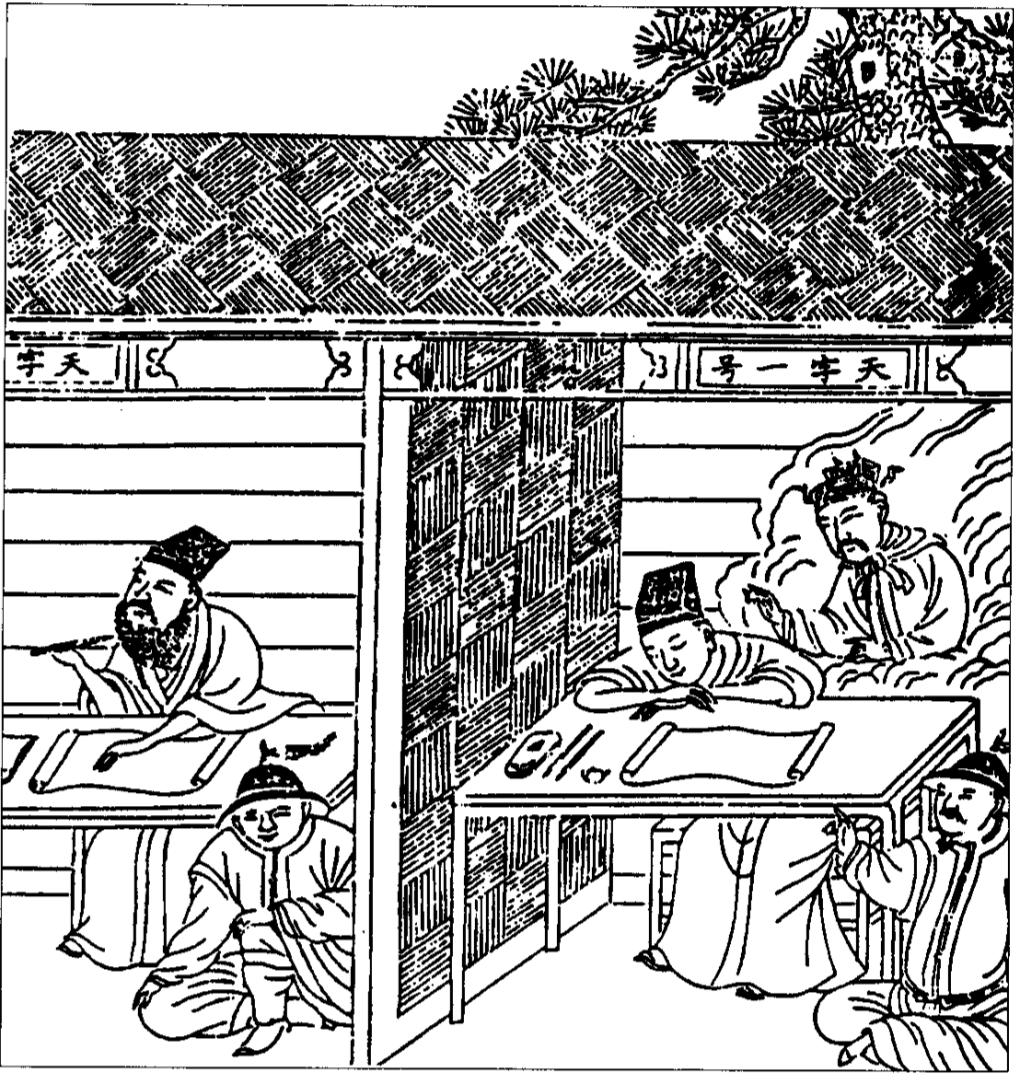
An examinee drunk in the cell, 1605

The imperial examinations influenced traditional Chinese religion as well as contemporary literary tradition. The examination system ostensibly represented the Confucian system in its most rationalist expression and was designed to achieve a society ruled by men of merit, as determined by an objective measure of the candidates' knowledge and intelligence. In practice, the examinations also included various religious and superstitious beliefs that extend the examinations beyond Confucian idealism. Traditional beliefs about fate, that cosmic forces predestine certain human affairs, and particularly that individual success or failure was subject to the will of Heaven and the influence and intervention by various deities, played into the interpretation of results when taking the tests. Zhong Kui, also known as Chung-kuei, was a deity associated with the examination system. The story is that he was a scholar who took the tests, and, despite his most excellent performance, he was unfairly deprived of the first-place prize by a corrupt system: in response, he killed himself, the act of suicide condemning him to be a ghost. Many people afraid of traveling on roads and paths that may be haunted by evil spirits have worshiped Zhong Kui as a protective deity. Also known as Kechang Yiwen Lu, the Strange Stories from the Examination Halls was a collection of stories popular among Confucian scholars of the Qing dynasty. The theme of many of the stories is that good deeds are rewarded by success in the examination halls, often by Heaven-inspired deities acting on karmic principles; and evil deeds result in failure, often under the influence of the ghosts of victims.

Some individuals were discriminated against because of their names, due to a naming taboo. For example, because the Tang dynasty poet Li He's father's name sounded like the jin, in jinshi, he was discouraged from taking the tests. The claim was that if Li He was called a jinshi, it would be against the rule of etiquette that a son not be called by his father's name.

== Influence ==
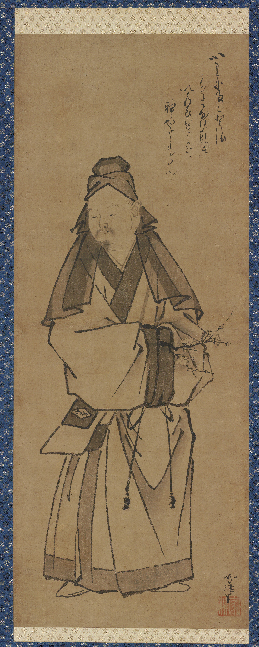
Tenjin (Michizane) Crossing to China, late 15th century by Sesshin, Muromachi period, Ink on paper

=== Japan ===
Chinese legal institutions and the examination system began to heavily influence Japan during the Tang dynasty. In 728, Sugawara no Kiyotomo took part in the Tang examinations. Near the end of the Tang era, Japan implemented the examination system, which lasted for some 200 years during the Heian period (794–1185). According to the Records of Palace Examinations, four shinshi (jinshi) passed the exams in 916: Fujiwara Takaki, Oue Koretoki, Harubuchi Yoshiki, and Fujiwara Harufusa. Poets such as Sugawara no Michizane and Miyoshi Yoshimune mentioned their experiences with the examinations in their writing:

Recalling the hard days of preparing for exam, I feel the present happiness is greater than any other happiness; having passed the imperial exam, I feel my present standpoint is higher than any others.

— Sugawara no Michizane

When I am alone, I cannot help thinking of successive failures in exams due to illness and inadequate talent, revealing the agony of those who failed.

— Miyoshi Yoshimune

Like the Chinese examinations, the curriculum revolved around the Confucian canon. As Japanese examinations developed, they diverged in practice from the Chinese ones. The xiucai exams became more popular than the jinshi because it was simpler and considered more practical. The Japanese examinations were also never opened to the common folk to the same extent as in China during the Song dynasty. Due to aristocratic influence, by the 10th century, only students recommended based on their reputation and record of service could take the exams. While the exams were still held after the 11th century, they had lost all practical value, and any candidates who had been nominated by dignitaries passed unconditionally. The Japanese imperial examinations gradually died out afterwards. The examinations were revived in 1787 during the Edo period. The new examinations, called sodoku kugin, were more or less the same as the Chinese ones in terms of content (Confucianism and Neo-Confucianism), but did not confer official titles, only honorary titles. During the early Meiji era, Kanda Takahira wrote a letter advocating for the establishment of a Japanese recruitment system with the Chinese imperial examination system as a model. The proposal failed to gain support.

Heian Japan did have a three-step exam system, with testing on the bureau, ministry, and imperial levels. But due to the power of aristocratic lineages, exam success did not translate into recruitment and political success. Scholars did have authoritative status, which is even obvious in parodies castigating their stuffiness, presumption, and lackadaisical diction appearing in vernacular works such as Murasaki Shikibu's The Tale of Genji (Genji monogatari 源氏物語, ca. 1014). But after the heyday of the State Academy during the eighth and ninth centuries, its social significance declined, to the point that it was not even rebuilt when it burned down in the twelfth century. With the famous exception of Sugawara no Michizane 菅原道真 (845–903), who earned senior first rank posthumously after dying miserably in exile due to machinations of the ascendant Fujiwara clan, scholars were and remained typically of middle rank. The function of the Academy was taken over by clan schools (J. bessō 別曹), and Confucian learning became a hereditary profession, with members of the Nakahara and Kiyohara clans specializing in the Classics and members of the Sugawara, Ôe, and some branches of the Fujiwara clan focusing on the Letters track.

— Wiebke Denecke and Nam Nguyen

=== Korea ===
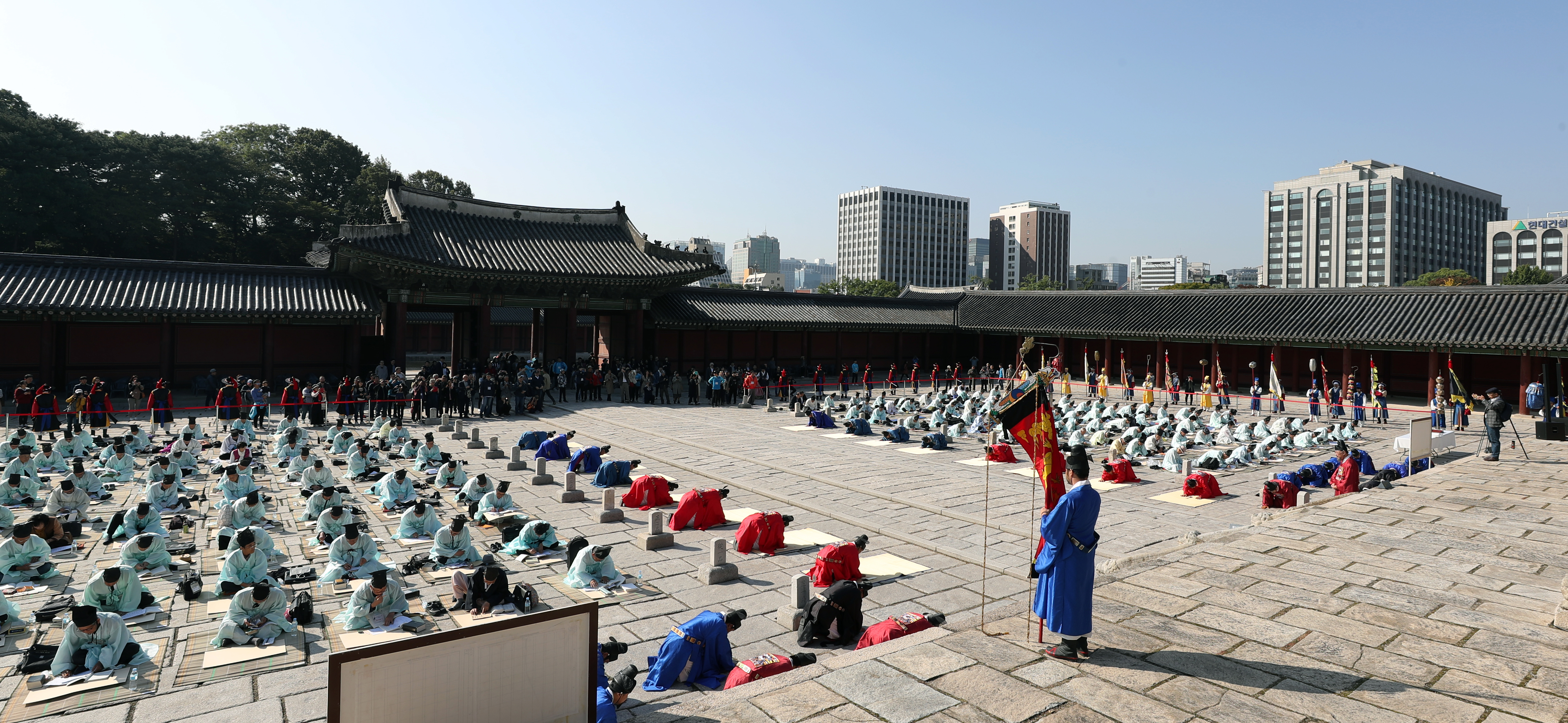
Gwageo reenactment, 2018

Korea directly participated in the Chinese imperial examination system during the 9th century when as many as 88 Sillans received degrees after passing the Tang examinations.

The Korean examination system was established in 958 under the reign of Gwangjong of Goryeo. The examination system was spread to Goryeo in 957 by a visiting Hanlin scholar named Shuang Ji from Later Zhou. Gwangjong was highly pleased with Shuang Ji and requested that he remain at the Korean court permanently.

According to Xu Jing, writing during the Song dynasty, the Korean examinations were largely the same as the Chinese ones with some differences. Unlike in China, the examination papers were written in both the Idu script and Classical Chinese. The exam takers did not sit in separate cells like in China, but rather sat on the ground in the open under sunshades.

The Korean civil service recruitment system follows that of our country with some differences: the students take primary exams in the temple of King Wenxuan every year and the eligible ones are titled as gongshi; among them about 350 will be selected after another examination one year later; those people then will take a higher exam held in Ying'en accommodation; about thirty to forty people will be admitted and classified to five grades, which is similar to metropolitan examination of our country; the final exam will be presided by the king himself who will test them on poetry, prose and argumentation essays. I think it is ridiculous that there is no question about current affairs in the exam. Moreover, there is one subject of diction in the exam, though seldom held, valuing literary grace and rhymes more than essence of classics, which might be inherited from the malpractices of the Tang dynasty.

— Xu Jing

Some Korean examination practices converged with the Chinese system. By the end of the Goryeo period, a military exam had been added, the triennial schedule observed, and the exam hierarchy organized into provincial, metropolitan, and palace levels, similar to the Chinese. Other practices, such as the inclusion of exams on Buddhism and the worship of Confucius, were not shared with China. Outside China, the examination system was most widely implemented in Korea, with enrollment rates surpassing even that of China. In theory, any free man (not Nobi) was able to take the examinations, but in practice the yangban aristocratic class eventually monopolized the system. At the start of the Joseon period, 33 candidates were selected from every triennial examination, and the number increased to 50 later on. In comparison, China's selected candidates after each palace examination were no more than 40 to 300 from the Tang to Ming dynasties while encompassing a landmass six times larger than Korea. By the Joseon period, high offices were closed to aristocrats who had not passed the exams. Over the span of 600 years, the Joseon civil service selected more than 14,606 candidates in the highest level examinations on 744 occasions. The examination system continued until 1894 when it was abolished by the Gabo Reform.

=== Vietnam ===
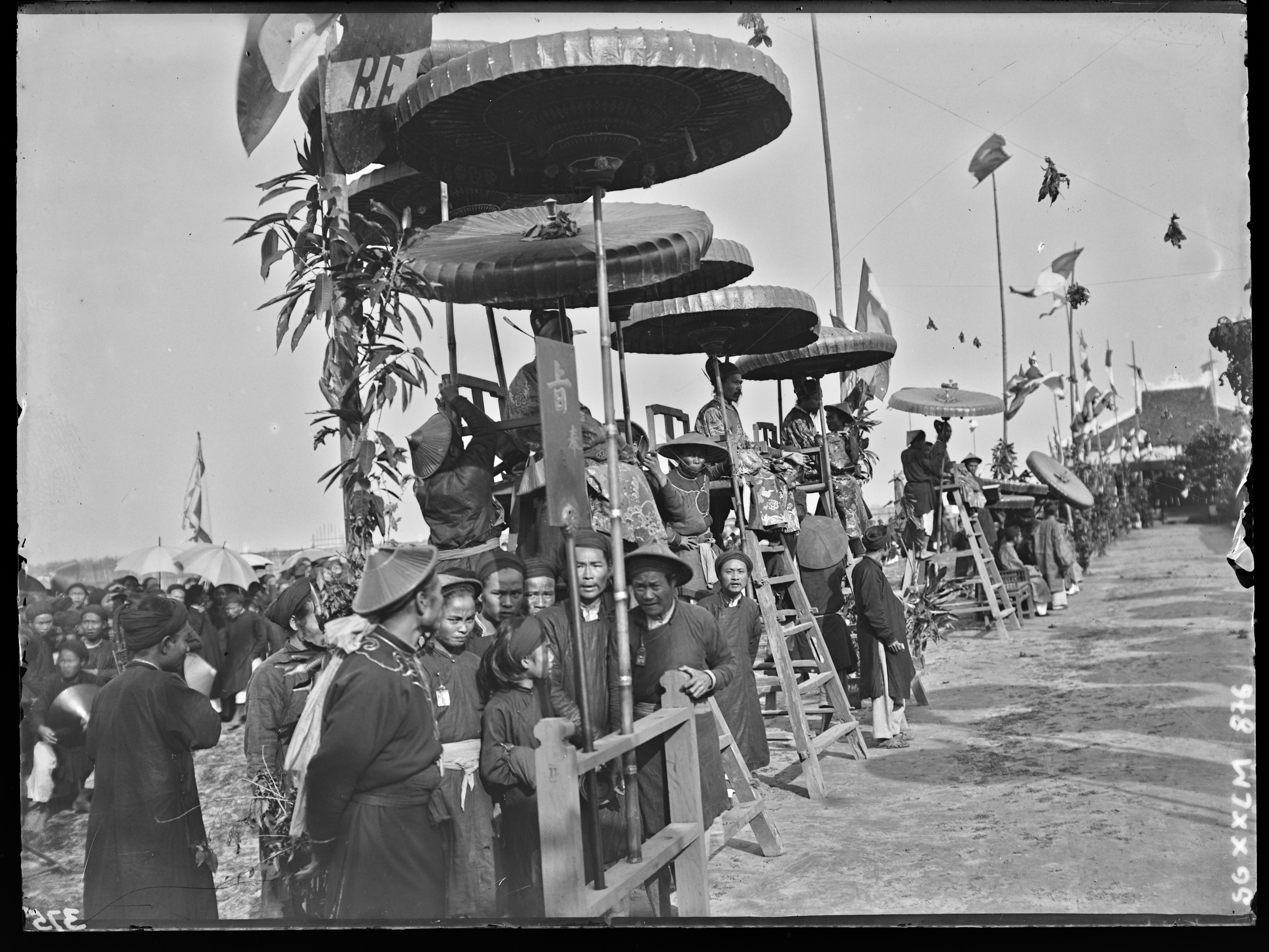
Invigilators lined up to receive the greetings of the successful candidates during the 1897 Nam Định provincial examination.

The Confucian examination system in Vietnam was established in 1075 under the Lý dynasty Emperor Lý Nhân Tông and lasted until the Nguyễn dynasty Emperor Khải Định (1919). During the Lý dynasty (1009–1225) the imperial examinations had very limited influence. Only four were held throughout the entire duration of the dynasty, producing a small handful of officials. Later during the Trần dynasty (1225–1400), Trần Thái Tông began to filter students through the Tiến sĩ (jinshi) examinations. From 1232 to 1314, ten Tiến sĩ examinations were held. In 1314, 50 Tiến sĩ were recruited in one exam. The exams were open to native Vietnamese as well as immigrant Chinese. For the first few centuries after the examinations were instituted, a significant portion of degree holders were of Chinese descent. Examinees during the Lê dynasty were seated according to name order in bamboo cages. This switched to tents during the Nguyễn dynasty.

Throughout most of the Vietnamese examinations' history, there were only three levels to the Vietnamese system: provincial, metropolitan, and court. A provincial examination was re-implemented by the Nguyễn dynasty (1802–1945) in 1807 after stabilizing the state and a metropolitan examination in 1825. Emperor Minh Mạng (r. 1820–1839) paid special attention to the examinations and even dined with newly recruited Tiến sĩ frequently. Although Confucian content took precedence in the examinations, material on Buddhism and Daoism were also included. In 1429, Lê Thái Tổ ordered famous Buddhist and Daoist monks to take the exams, and if they failed, they had to forfeit their religious life. Elephants were used to guard the examination halls until 1840. During the 845 years of civil service examinations held in Vietnam, about 3,000 candidates passed the highest level exams and had their names carved on stelae in the Temple of Literature in Hanoi.

=== In the West ===
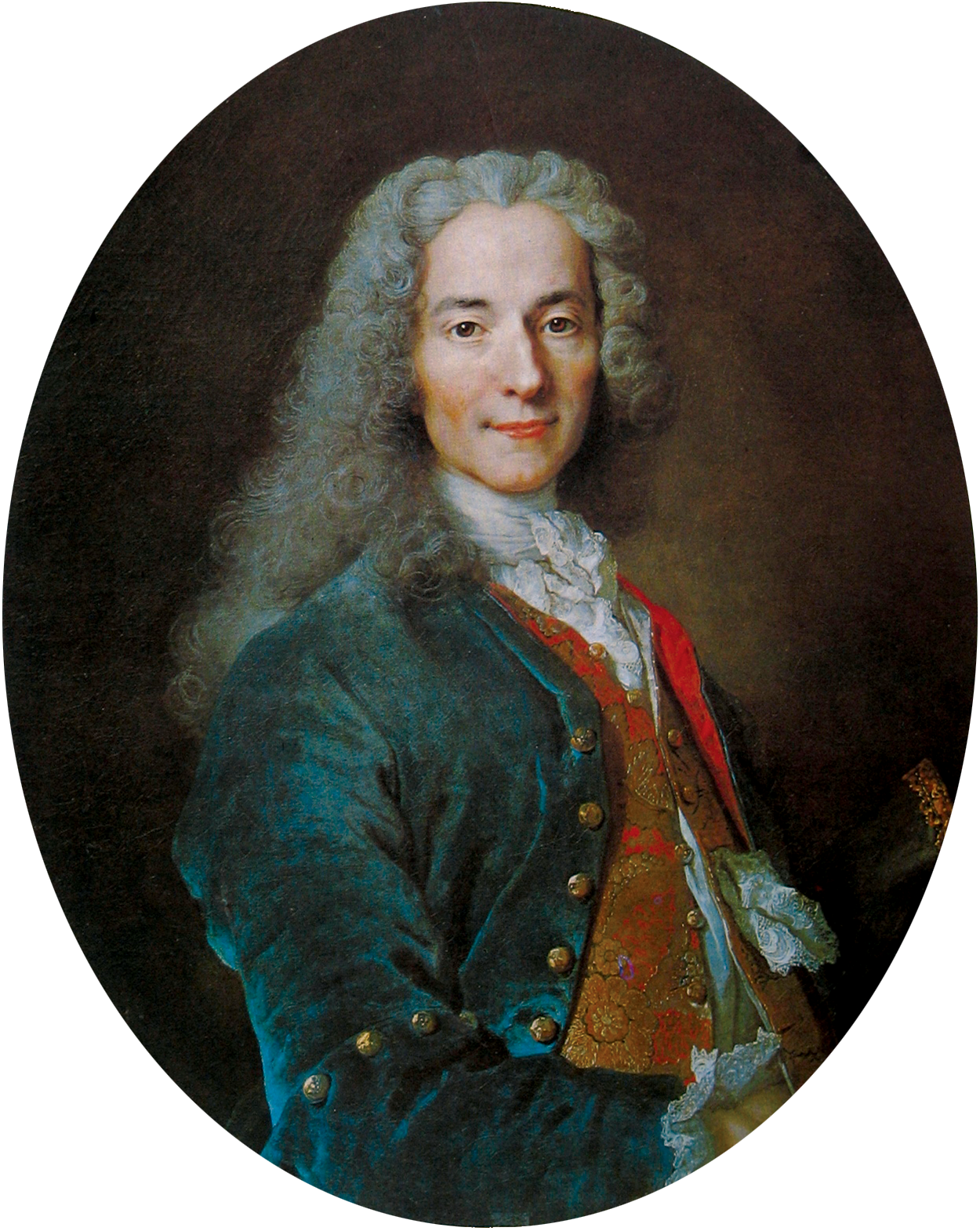
Voltaire

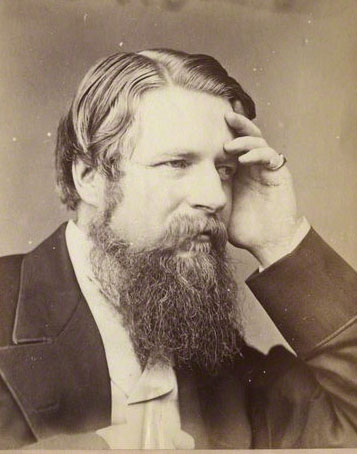
Stafford Northcote, 1st Earl of Iddesleigh

The imperial examination system was known to Europeans as early as 1570. It received great attention from the Jesuit Matteo Ricci (1552–1610), who viewed it and its Confucian appeal to rationalism favorably in comparison to religious reliance on "apocalypse". Knowledge of Confucianism and the examination system was disseminated broadly in Europe following the Latin translation of Ricci's journal in 1614. During the 18th century, the imperial examinations were often discussed in conjunction with Confucianism, which attracted great attention from contemporary European thinkers such as Gottfried Wilhelm Leibniz, Voltaire, Montesquieu, Baron d'Holbach, Johann Wolfgang von Goethe, and Friedrich Schiller. In France and Britain, Confucian ideology was used in attacking the privilege of the elite. Figures such as Voltaire claimed that the Chinese had "perfected moral science" and François Quesnay advocated an economic and political system modeled after that of the Chinese. According to Ferdinand Brunetière (1849–1906), followers of physiocracy such as François Quesnay, whose theory of free trade was based on Chinese classical theory, were sinophiles bent on introducing the "Chinese spirit" to France. Brunetière also claimed that French education was really based on Chinese literary examinations which were popularized in France by philosophers, especially Voltaire. Western perception of China in the 18th century admired the Chinese bureaucratic system as favourable over European governments for its seeming meritocracy. However those who admired China such as Christian Wolff were sometimes persecuted. In 1721 he gave a lecture at the University of Halle praising Confucianism, for which he was accused of atheism and forced to give up his position at the university.

Johann Heinrich Gottlob Justi based much of his inspiration for cameralism on contemporary accounts of the Chinese imperial bureaucracy. The growth of cameralist studies, which played an important role in Prussian civil service training, may be traced to Justi's admiration for the Imperial examinations of China. Justi, like other cameralists, also lauded many Chinese public policies including the examination system.

East Asia's academies were associated with an examination system. What stunned early modern European missionaries in China was the connection between a state-run examination system and recruitment into civil service. The idea of a system that seemed to place merit over birth and allow for dramatic social mobility was most attractive for contemporary Europeans in the grip of the hazards of absolutist monarchies. Although access to the academies was often limited to children from families of a certain rank, and much modern scholarship has highlighted the limitations for social mobility in these systems, it is important to acknowledge the very existence of institutions that in their principles and ideological rhetoric rewarded moral and academic worth.

— Wiebke Denecke and Nam Nguyen

The earliest evidence of examinations in Europe date to 1215 or 1219 in Bologna. These were chiefly oral in the form of a question or answer, disputation, determination, defense, or public lecture. The candidate gave a public lecture of two prepared passages assigned to him from the civil or canon law, and then doctors asked him questions, or expressed objections to answers. Evidence of written examinations do not appear until 1702 at Trinity College, Cambridge. According to Sir Michael Sadler, Europe may have had written examinations since 1518 but the "evidence is not very clear". In Prussia, medication examinations began in 1725. The Mathematical Tripos, founded in 1747, is commonly believed to be the first honor examination, but James Bass Mullinger considered "the candidates not having really undergone any examination whatsoever" because the qualification for a degree was merely four years of residence. France adopted the examination system in 1791 as a result of the French Revolution but it collapsed after only ten years. Germany implemented the examination system around 1800. In 1840, France set an envoy to Germany to examine its examination system with a view of applying it in France. Competitive exams were set up respectively in 1872, 1879 and 1886 for the three administrative Grands corps (Conseil d'État, Inspection des Finances and Cour des Comptes) until the generalisation of an examination to enter the French Civil Service in 1941.

Englishmen in the 18th century such as Eustace Budgell recommended imitating the Chinese examination system. Adam Smith recommended examinations to qualify for employment in 1776. In 1838, the Congregational church missionary Walter Henry Medhurst considered the Chinese exams to be "worthy of imitating". In 1806, the British East India Company established a Civil Service College near London for training of the company's administrators in India. This was based on the recommendations of East India Company officials serving in China and had seen the Imperial examinations. In 1829, the company introduced civil service examinations in India on a limited basis. This established the principle of qualification process for civil servants in England. In 1847 and 1856, Thomas Taylor Meadows strongly recommended the adoption of the Chinese principle of competitive examinations in Great Britain. Both Thomas Babington Macaulay, who was instrumental in passing the Saint Helena Act 1833, and Stafford Northcote, 1st Earl of Iddesleigh, who prepared the Northcote–Trevelyan Report that catalyzed the British civil service, were familiar with Chinese history and institutions. When the report was brought up in parliament in 1853, Lord Monteagle argued against the implementation of open examinations because it was a Chinese system and China was not an "enlightened country". Lord Stanley called the examinations the "Chinese Principle". The Earl of Granville did not deny this but argued in favor of the examination system, considering that the minority Manchus had been able to rule China with it for over 200 years. In 1854, Edwin Chadwick reported that some noblemen did not agree with the measures introduced because they were Chinese. The examination system was finally implemented in the British Indian Civil Service in 1855, prior to which admission into the civil service was purely a matter of patronage, and in England in 1870. Even as late as ten years after the competitive examination plan was passed, people still attacked it as an "adopted Chinese culture". Alexander Baillie-Cochrane, 1st Baron Lamington insisted that the English "did not know that it was necessary for them to take lessons from the Celestial Empire". In 1875, Archibald Sayce voiced concern over the prevalence of competitive examinations, which he described as "the invasion of this new Chinese culture".

After Great Britain's successful implementation of systematic, open, and competitive examinations in India in the 19th century, similar systems were instituted in the United Kingdom itself, and in other Western nations. Like the British, the development of the French and American civil service was influenced by the Chinese system. When Thomas Jenckes made a Report from the Joint Select Committee on Retrenchment in 1868, it contained a chapter on the civil service in China. In 1870, William Spear wrote a book called The Oldest and the Newest Empire: China and the United States, in which he urged the United States government to adopt the Chinese examination system. Like in Britain, many of the American elites scorned the plan to implement competitive examinations, which they considered foreign, Chinese, and "un-American". As a result, the civil services reform introduced into the House of Representatives in 1868 was not passed until 1883. The Civil Service Commission tried to combat such sentiments in its report:

... with no intention of commending either the religion or the imperialism of China, we could not see why the fact that the most enlightened and enduring government of the Eastern world had acquired an examination as to the merits of candidates for office, should any more deprive the American people of that advantage, if it might be an advantage, than the facts that Confucius had taught political morality, and the people of China had read books, used the compass, gunpowder, and the multiplication table, during centuries when this continent was a wilderness, should deprive our people of those conveniences.

— Civil Service Commission

== Examinations in modern China ==
=== 1912–1949 ===
After the fall of the Qing in 1912, Dr. Sun Yat-sen, the leader of the newly risen Republic of China, developed similar procedures for the new political system through an institution called the Examination Yuan, one of the five branches of government, although this was quickly suspended due to the turmoil in China between the two world wars, such as the Warlord era and the Japanese invasion. The Kuomintang administration revived the Examination Yuan in 1947 after the defeat of Japan. This system continues into present times in Taiwan along with the government itself after loss of the mainland to the Chinese Communist Party.

=== 1949–present ===
In the People's Republic of China (PRC), the revolutionary government of Mao Zedong rejected the imperial examination system in favor of cadres chosen for loyalty to the ruling Communist Party. Since the economic reform era of the 1980s, the Civil Service maintains a system of examinations for selection and promotion of civil servants.

In the Republic of China (ROC), the constitution specifies that a public servant cannot be employed without going through an examination. The employment is usually also lifelong (that is, until age of retirement).

== See also ==
- Gaokao
- Bar exam
- Chinese classic texts
- Confucian court examination system in Vietnam
- Donglin Academy
- Education in the People's Republic of China
- Eight-legged essay, a literary form developed in association with examination requirements
- Four Books and Five Classics, Confucian works used in the examinations
- Gwageo, Korean national examination system begun in Unified Silla, expanded in Goryeo dynasty, and continued by the Joseon administration
- Hanlin Academy
- Huang Zongxi
- Imperial examination in Chinese mythology, cultural and mythological features related to the examinations
- Mandarin square
- Music Bureau
- Nine-rank system, a predecessor to the later imperial examination system
- Rulin Waishi, a Qing-dynasty satirical novel that ridicules the imperial examination and scholars around it
- Scholar-bureaucrats, a class of educated government officials in Chinese history
- Wen Wu temple, official temples dedicated to the worship of the Civil and Martial Deities
