= Six Chapters from My Life in the Cadre School =

Memoir on Cultural Revolution

Six Chapters of Life in a Cadre School: Memoirs from China's Cultural Revolution (Chinese: 干校六记; pinyin: Gānxiào liùjì) is a memoir by Chinese author, playwright, and translator Yang Jiang. First published in 1981, it recounts Yang's experiences with her husband Qian Zhongshu during their re-education through manual labor at a May Seventh Cadre School in rural Henan Province from 1969 to 1972, amid the Cultural Revolution. Modeled on the Qing dynasty classic Six Records of a Floating Life by Shen Fu, the book employs restrained prose yet poignant ironies to depict daily hardships and personal reflections, subtly critiquing the era while emphasizing human resilience and marital devotion.

== The work ==
=== Background ===
Yang Jiang and Qian Zhongshu, both prominent intellectuals with overseas study experience, were targeted during the Cultural Revolution (1966–1976). Qian was dispatched to a cadre school in 1969, with Yang joining in 1970; they returned to Beijing in 1972. The cadre schools aimed to reform intellectuals through labor. The memoir, written years later, focuses on everyday life rather than overt political commentary. Nonetheless, for western critics, the apparent absence of sensitive subject matters and omissions does not diminish the work's impact and criticism on the Cultural Revolutions and its senseless policies.

=== Content ===
The six chapters echo the structure of Shen Fu's Six Records of a Floating Life. The narratives seemingly unfolded around the "insignificant" and "commonplace events", while omitting major political incidents or figures making the era including Chairman Mao, Jiang Qing, and Lin Biao.

- I. Farewell: Departing for "Downunder": This chapter records the family's forced separation in November 1969, when Qian Zhongshu was sent to the "May Seventh Cadre School" in Henan. Yang describes the hurried departure on the eve of Qian's 60th birthday and the somber farewell at the railway station. Beyond the personal parting, the narrative subtly references the tragic suicide of her son-in-law, Deyi, amid political upheavals.
- II. Labor: Digging a Well: Following the author's own relocation to Henan, Yang documents her experience with grueling manual labor, specifically digging wells and planting vegetables. She records the physical toll on aging intellectuals and observes the palpable social divide between the "re-educated" and their peasant overseers. The chapter serves as a critique on the systemic waste of human talents.
- III. Leisure: Tending a Vegetable Patch: Assigned to tend a remote vegetable nursery, Yang describes how this workspace transformed into a clandestine meeting point for her and her husband Qian Zhongshu. Since Qian's duties involved delivering farming tools, the couple exploited their relative freedom to share brief, quiet moments together along the riverbanks. Despite the title's suggestion of "leisure," the chapter emphasizes the resilience of marital devotion and the pursuit of private emotional sanctuary within a highly surveilled and oppressive environment.
- IV. "Quickie: A Loving Companion: This chapter focuses on "Xiaoqu," a stray dog the couple adopted for companionship in the harsh wilderness of the cadre school. Yang details the dog's unwavering loyalty, which offered a rare source of comfort amidst social isolation. By using the dog's spirit as a foil to the complexity and occasional cruelty of human nature during the Cultural Revolution, Yang creates a poignant metaphor for the displacement and vulnerability of the intellectuals themselves.
- V. Adventure: While all Ends Well: Yang recounts a perilous journey she undertook during a violent rainstorm to visit her ailing husband in a different camp. Braving rising floodwaters and treacherous wilderness alone, she eventually confirmed Qian's safety, an act of defiance against both nature and the restrictive rules of the school. The "luck" referenced in the title signifies both the physical survival of the trek and the preservation of individual human emotion over the "political storms" that sought to suppress it.
- VI. Wronged: But Home - At Last: The final chapter captures the psychological toll of the "misinformation" and shifting rumors regarding the couple's return to Beijing. Yang describes the "false joys" of rumored recalls that never materialized, until they were eventually permitted to leave and return home in 1972. Reflecting on these two years, Yang concludes that she remained her original self, never ideologically transformed as the movement intended.

Yang's restrained style, marked by irony and humor, conveys sorrow without anger, highlighting endurance and affection between the spouses amid oppression. Yang's husband, eminent writer and critic Qian Zhongshu, noted in the foreword that a missing Chapter Seven should have been included titled "Shame: Participating in Political Campaigns". Qian believed that a sense of grievances or remorse should have been felt by the wrongly accused, the "flag wavers", the blind followers, and the cowardly audience including Yang Jiang and himself. However, Qian remarked ironically at the same time, that such emotions were not welcomed and therefore were "forgotten" and "eliminated".

=== Publication history ===
The essays first appeared in a Hong Kong magazine in 1981. The mainland publication was facilitated by editor Fan Yong of Sanlian Bookstore, after an affirmation by senior communist party cadre Hu Qiaomu for its restrained style and truthful depiction. The first English translation by Geremie Barmé appeared in 1982. A most popular edition was translated by Howard Goldblatt with Jonathan Spence's preface, published in 1984, incorporating additional afterword, blurbs, notes, and cover images to assist readers in understanding the historical contexts. In a period of 4 years, there were 83 letters exchanged between the author, the translator Goldblatt, and the editors, in an effort to refine language choices. A third translation by Djang Chu with annotations was published by Westview Press in 1986. Paratexts in editions vary, with Western editions emphasizing political context.

== Reception ==
Western critics praise its subtle restraint and moral urgency. Chinese literary responses highlighted its truthful depiction and stylistic features "Sorrow without being overwhelmed; grieved yet not enraged." Scholarship notes its role in canonization through publishing, criticism, and literary history inclusion. It is seen as innovative narrative prose providing poetic testimony to history.

Professor Tao Dongfeng of Capital Normal University addressed the omission of major political events and apparently selective story telling in Yang's work. Unlike other scar literature arising from similar experiences, Yang adopts the perspective of a level-headed observer rather than that of a direct participant or victim of the political campaigns. Professor Tao held that such narrative approach reflected Yang's disposition as an independent intellectual rather than that of a revolutionary scholar. Yang was born into a cultured family and studied in Europe in the 1930s before the Communist regime took control. Yang remained in China after 1949 out of patriotism rather than political alignment. As an "outsider" to the Communist Party and its ideologies, she adopted the perspective of an observer. This detachment informed her restrained tone and narrative choices throughout China's most turbulent periods.
