= Fortress Besieged =

1947 novel by Qian Zhongshu

- Cover art of the 1st edition of Fortress Besieged, 1947
- Author: Qian Zhongshu
- Language: Standard Chinese
- Genre: Novel
- Publication date: 1947
- Publication place: China
- Media type: Print (Hardback & Paperback)
- ISBN: 978-0-14-118786-0 (2006 Penguin edition)

Fortress Besieged (simplified Chinese: 围城; traditional Chinese: 圍城; pinyin: Wéichéng) is a Chinese satirical novel written by Qian Zhongshu (Ch'ien Chung-shu), first published in 1947, and widely considered one of the masterpieces of twentieth century Chinese literature. The novel is a humorous tale about middle-class Chinese society in the late 1930s. It gained worldwide popularity after it was reprinted in the 1980s and made into a television series in 1990.

== Origin and History ==
Qian Zhongshu started writing the novel in 1944 and completed it in 1946. He began writing the book while he and his wife, Yang Jiang, were living in Shanghai during the Japanese occupation. According to Yang Jiang, the successful production of several of her plays inspired Qian to write a full-length novel.

Qian's personal experiences abroad and in China inspired the characters and plot of the novel. For example, both Qian and the protagonist, Fang Hongjian, studied abroad in the mid-1930s. Furthermore, Qian's journey through rural China during the war to teach at Lantian Normal College in Hunan in 1939 influenced Fang's journey to San Lü University.

The title is based on a purportedly French proverb:

Marriage is like a fortress besieged: those who are outside want to get in, and those who are inside want to get out. (Le mariage est une forteresse assiégée, ceux qui sont dehors veulent y entrer, ceux qui sont dedans veulent en sortir.)

The novel is known for its acerbic asides, such as describing one young lady in the following way:

Others called her "Truth," since it is said that "the truth is naked." But Miss Pao wasn't exactly without a stitch on, so they revised her name to "Partial Truth."
又有人叫她「真理」，因為據說「真理」是赤裸裸的。鮑小姐並未一絲不掛，所以他們修正為「局部的真理」。

Qian never completed another novel after the 1940s, shifting to writing research publications on classical Chinese literature. He began work on a second novel entitled Bai He Xin (Chinese: 百合心; lit. 'Lily Heart'), but the manuscript was lost when he and his family moved to Beijing in 1949.

== Publishing history ==
The literary work was published in its original version in Shanghai during the year of 1947. The second edition was published in 1948. The third edition in 1949. After the Communist Revolution, the book was not reprinted in mainland China again until 1980. In the meantime, it was also banned in Taiwan because of its scathing satire of the Nationalist government.

Although the domestic distribution faced decades of restrictions under political sensitivity, the novel was translated and published and internationally distributed starting from the 1960s. Currently the novel is translated into languages such as English, French, German, Russian and Japanese.

== Plot summary ==
Set in the 1930s, the novel follows the misadventures of Fang Hongjian. (Note: Fang Hung-chien in other romanization.) The book begins with Fang returning home to China after running out of money while studying abroad. It is revealed that his studies were financed by a family friend, but Fang Hongjian wasted his time aimlessly bouncing between European schools. Fang bought a fake degree to have something to show for his studies.

On board the Vicomte de Bragelonne, Fang meets Su Wenwan (Chinese: 蘇文紈; pinyin: Sū Wénwán), a young woman in her late 20s. She is quite pretty, if thin and pallid, but her pickiness means she is unmarried. He also meets the tanned and voluptuous Miss Pao (Chinese: 鮑小姐; pinyin: Bào xiǎojiě), whom Fang pursues with some success during the voyage. When the boat reaches Hong Kong Miss Pao disembarks into the embrace of her fiancé, a middle-aged balding doctor, and Fang realizes he has been used.

Fang returns to Shanghai and joins his family who are fleeing Japanese occupation. He encounters Su Wenwan, her cousin Tang Xiaofu (Chinese: 唐曉芙), and Su Wenwan's suitor Zhao Xinmei (Chinese: 赵辛楣). Fang Hongjian wants to pursue Tang Xiaofu, but Su Wenwan expects him to propose to her instead. Zhao Xinmei also misinterprets Fang Hongjian's intentions and sees him as a romantic rival. Their romantic ambitions are all foiled: Tang Xiaofu moves away and Su Wenwan marries another man. Eventually Fang Hongjian and Zhao Xinmei both receive job offers to teach at San Lü University in the countryside. Zhao Xinmei gathers other teachers hired by San Lü in order to make the journey from Shanghai as a group. The story the follows the group's journey through the Chinese countryside to reach their new employer.

At the university Fang Hongjian develops a friendship with Zhao Xinmei and falls in love with assistant professor Sun Roujia (Chinese: 孫柔嘉). All three characters become involved in the workplace politics of the faculty members. Eventually both Fang Hongjian and Zhao Xinmei are forced out of the university. Zhao Xinmei goes to Chengdu to work in the government. Fang Hongjian and Sun Roujia decide to return to Shanghai together and they marry each other en route.

The final part of the book centers around Fang Hongjian and Sun Roujia's disastrous marriage. Extended family members frequently interfere in their lives and both of them are slighted by their respective in-laws. The two of them go through multiple rounds of arguing and reconciliation. After a particularly intense argument Sun Roujia leaves to stay with her aunt. The novel ends with Fang Hongjian listening to the chiming of a clock in the empty house.

== Influence ==
The novel have been described by Jonathan Spence as "a classic of world literature, a masterpiece of parodic fiction" and the "greatest Chinese novel of the twentieth century", while the literary critic C.T. Hsia has called Fortress Besieged, "the most delightful and carefully wrought novel in modern Chinese literature" and "perhaps ... the greatest". The satiric and metaphorical novel echoed the multilayers of phenomenons faced by China. Aspects of the novel have entered the Chinese idiomatic lexicon. For example, the fictional "Carleton University" (克萊登大學), where the novel's character obtained his bogus degree, is used as an idiom to signify an illegitimate foreign degree qualification or academic institution. Likewise, the novel's title, deriving from the French proverb, has given rise to a similar saying in Chinese.

Fortress Besieged English cover design from Penguin Books

The novel also shed light on perspectives in topics such as identity, women, marriage, education and middle-class snobbery during the Chinese Republic period. Qian reflected on "harmony without uniformity" in Sino-Western intercultural dialogue through incorporating cultural relativism and the principle of "diversity" in Fortress Besieged. The cross cultural references create literary and theoretical links between the West and the East in 20th century Chinese academic history. With the translated versions in majority speaking languages, the novel connects foreign and domestic readers to interpret the social complexities in China through relatable cultural references.

== Translation ==
The novel has been translated into many languages. The translation was translated into English version by Nathan K. Mao (茅国权) and Jeanne Kelly in 1979, a Russian version in 1979, a German version in 1982, a French version in 1987, and a Japanese version in 1988. In April 1980, the Indiana University Press published it. It was updated in 2004 by New Directions Publishing with an additional foreword by the historian Jonathan Spence. The novel was reissued by New Directions Publishing on May 5, 2026 with an introduction by Yiyun Li.
