= Yang Bi =

Chinese translator and academic (1922–1968)

- 杨必
- Born: May 1922; Shanghai, China
- Died: March 4, 1968 (aged 45); Shanghai, China
- Education: Aurora Women's College of Arts and Sciences
- Occupations: Translator, professor
- Relatives: Yang Yinhang (father); Tang Xu'an (mother); Yang Jiang (sister)
- Writing career
- Pen name: Xinyi (心一)
- Language: Chinese, English
- Notable work: Vanity Fair

Yang Bi (simplified Chinese: 杨必; traditional Chinese: 楊必; pinyin: Yáng Bì; born May 1922 - 4 March 1968) was a Chinese translator and associate professor at Fudan University.

== Biography ==
Yang was born in May 1922 in Shanghai, while her ancestral home in Wuxi, Jiangsu. Her father Yang Yinhang ((Chinese: 杨荫杭); 1878 - 1945) was a jurist who graduated from Waseda University and the University of Pennsylvania. Her mother Tang Xu'an (Chinese: 唐须荌) was a housewife. Her sister Yang Jiang was a writer and translator. She was raised in Suzhou. She studied and then taught at Aurora Women's College of Arts and Sciences. In 1952, Aurora Women's College of Arts and Sciences was merged into Fudan University, she was promoted to associate professor. In 1968, she was asked to account for the International Labour Office in the "Cleaning up the Class Movement" (Chinese: 清理阶级队伍运动). She died during that movement at the age of 46.

== Translation ==
- Vanity Fair (William Makepeace Thackeray) (名利场)
