= Francis L. K. Hsu =

American anthropologist (1909–1999)

- 許烺光 Xu Hongguang
- Born: 28 October 1909; Zhuanghe, Liaoning, China
- Died: 15 December 1999 (aged 90); Tiburon, California, United States
- Education: University of Shanghai; Fu Jen Catholic University; London School of Economics
- Scientific career
- Fields: Anthropology
- Workplaces: Northwestern University; Cornell University; Columbia University
- Doctoral advisor: Bronisław Malinowski

Francis L. K. Hsu
- Traditional Chinese: 許烺光
- Simplified Chinese: 许烺光
Transcriptions
Standard Mandarin
- Hanyu Pinyin: Xǔ Lǎngguāng

Francis L. K. Hsu (28 October 1909 Zhuanghe County, Liaoning, China – 15 December 1999 Tiburon, California) was a China-born American anthropologist, one of the founders of psychological anthropology. He was president of the American Anthropological Association from 1977 to 1978.

== Career ==
Hsu was born on October 28, 1909, in Zhuanghe, Liaoning, China. He entered Tianjin Nankai High School in 1923, graduated from the Department of Sociology at the University of Shanghai in 1933, entered the Graduate School of Fu Jen Catholic University in the same year, and later engaged in social work at Peking Union Medical College Hospital.

He obtained the Boxer Indemnity Scholarship (United Kingdom) in 1937 and went to London to study anthropology at the London School of Economics, where he studied under Bronisław Malinowski. He obtained a doctorate in 1941 and was invited by Fei Xiaotong to return to China. In 1943, he was invited by Ralph Linton to visit the United States and he has since stayed in the country as a teacher.

He served as a lecturer at Columbia University from 1944 to 1945. Acting Assistant Professor at Cornell University from 1945 to 1947. In 1947, he was hired as a formal assistant professor at Northwestern University. He was promoted to professor ten years later and served as the head of the anthropology department from 1957 to 1976 for two decades. In 1964, he went to Japan to serve as a visiting professor at Kyoto University and conducted a field survey.

== Contributions ==
Hsu was among the founders of psychological anthropology. He has updated and renewed the methodology of cultural and personality research and expanded knowledge of large-scale civil society. His theory has influenced the development of Chinese psychology and the production of psychoculture. His research provides a non-Western perspective on the study of human behavior and is of great reference value to the research of behavioral science.

== Retirement and death ==
Hsu retired from Northwestern in 1978 and was hired by the University of San Francisco as the director of the Cultural Research Center. He also served as a senior researcher at the East–West Center at the University of Hawaii. He retired again in 1982, but continued lectures and academic work.

He continued to write in 1986 in spite of a myocardial infarction, and then had another two strokes and had to stop academic research. He died in San Francisco on December 15, 1999, at the age of 91.

== Recognition ==
The American Anthropological Association established the Francis L. K. Hsu Book Prize to commemorate his contribution.

- The 62nd (1977-1978) President of the American Anthropological Association
- Honorary Professor of Northwest University
- Academician of the 12th (1978) Academia Sinica.
- Deputy Editor of the Journal of Comparative Family Studies
- Advisor of the International Journal of Social Psychiatry

== Selected publications ==
=== Books ===
- ——— (1949). "Suppression Versus Repression, a Limited Psychological Interpretation of Four Cultures". Psychiatry. 12 (3). Place of publication not identified: 223–242. doi:10.1080/00332747.1949.11022736. PMID 24536183.
- Shih, Kuo-heng; Tian, Rukang; Mayo, Elton; Mayo, Dorothea McConnel (1944). Fei, Xiaotong; Hsu, Francis L. K. (eds.). China Enters the Machine Age; a Study of Labor in Chinese War Industry. Cambridge, Mass.: Harvard University Press. OCLC 404562.
- ——— (1948). Under the Ancestors' Shadow; Chinese Culture and Personality. New York: Columbia University Press.
- ——— (1952). Religion, Science and Human Crises; a Study of China in Transition and Its Implications for the West. London: Routledge & K. Paul.
- ——— (1953). Americans and Chinese: Two Ways of Life. New York: H. Schuman.
- ——— (1961). Psychological Anthropology; Approaches to Culture and Personality. Homewood, Ill: Dorsey Press.
- ——— (1963). Clan, Caste, and Club. Princeton, N.J: Van Nostrand.
- ——— (1967). Under the Ancestors' Shadow : Kinship, Personality, and Social Mobility in Village China. Garden City, N.Y: Anchor Books.
- ——— (1969). The Study of Literate Civilizations. New York: Holt, Rinehart and Winston.
- ——— (1970). Americans and Chinese: Purpose and Fulfillment in Great Civilizations. Garden City, N.Y: Published for the American Museum of Natural History [by] the Natural History Press.
- ——— (1971). Under the Ancestors' Shadow; Kinship, Personality, and Social Mobility in China. Stanford, Calif: Stanford University Press. ISBN 0804707677.
- ——— (1971). The Challenge of the American Dream: The Chinese in the United States. Belmont, Calif: Wadsworth Pub. Co. ISBN 0534000436.
- ——— (1971). Kinship and Culture. Chicago: Aldine Pub. Co. ISBN 0202010783.
- ——— (1972). Psychological Anthropology. Cambridge, Mass: Schenkman Pub. Co.; distributed by General Learning Press [Morristown, N.J.
- ——— (1973). The Minority Experience in Anthropology : Report of the Committee on Minorities and Anthropology. Washington: American Anthropological Association.
- Hsü-Balzer, Eileen; Hsu, Francis L. K. (1974). China Day by Day. New Haven: Yale University Press. ISBN 9780300017519. OCLC 947696.
- ——— (1975). Iemoto: The Heart of Japan. Cambridge, Mass: Schenkman Pub. Co.; [distributed by] Halsted Press, New York.
- ——— (1981). Americans and Chinese : Passage to Differences. Honolulu: University Press of Hawaii. ISBN 0824807103.
- Chu, Godwin C. and Francis L. K. Hsu (1983). China's New Social Fabric. London: Kegan Paul International in association with the East-West Center, Honolulu. ISBN 0710300506.
- ——— (1983). Exorcising the Trouble Makers : Magic, Science, and Culture. Westport, Conn: Greenwood Press. ISBN 0313237808.
- Marsella, Anthony J.; De Vos, George A.; Hsu, Francis L. K. (1985). Culture and Self : Asian and Western Perspectives. New York: Tavistock Publications. ISBN 042279130X. OCLC 11624089.
- Hsu, L. K. Francis and Hendrick Serrie (1998). The Overseas Chinese : Ethnicity in National Context. Lanham, Md: University Press of America. ISBN 076181163X.

=== Articles and chapters ===
- ———— (1979). "The Cultural Problem of the Cultural Anthropologist". American Anthropologist. 81 (3): 517–532. doi:10.1525/aa.1979.81.3.02a00010.. Presidential Address, American Anthropological Association, Los Angeles, 1978. Free access HERE
- ———— (1980). "Passage to Understanding". In Spindler, George D. (ed.). The Making of Psychological Anthropology. Vol. 239. Univ of California Press. pp. 142–173. ISBN 0520039572.
- ———— (1999). "My Life as a Marginal Man: Autobiographical Discussions with Francis Lk Hsu (Interviewed and Recorded by Glt Hsu and Flk Hsu's Family)". Taipei, Taiwan: National Institute for Compilation and Translation/SMC.

== References and further reading ==
- Busch, Ruth C. (1977). "If the Hsu Fits ... an Extension of the Hypothesis Relating Kinship and Culture Developed by Francis L.K. Hsu". Journal of Comparative Family Studies. 8 (3): 301–313. doi:10.3138/jcfs.8.3.301.
- Claes, Tom (1996). "Theorizing the West: A Second Look at Francis L.K. Hsu". Cultural Dynamics. 8 (1): 79–99. doi:10.1177/092137409600800105. S2CID 144696882.
- Northwestern University Archives, Hsu, Francis L.K., 1909-1999
- Liang, Yongjia (2010). "The 'Ethnic Error' in Under the Ancestors' Shadow and Dali Society in the Period of the Nationalist Government". Chinese Sociology & Anthropology. 42 (4): 78–94. doi:10.2753/CSA0009-4625420405. S2CID 144747767.
- Serrie, Hendrick (March 2001). "Francis L. K. Hsu (1909-1999)". American Anthropologist. 103 (1): 168–171. doi:10.1525/aa.2001.103.1.168.
- Zhang, Huazhi (2006). "Family Enterprises and Extending Research on the Fieldwork of Francis L.K. Hsu". Chinese Sociology & Anthropology. 38 (2): 32–57. doi:10.2753/CSA0009-4625380203. S2CID 144016268.
