= May Seventh Cadre School =

Rural commune for education through labor

May Seventh Cadre Schools (simplified Chinese: 五七干校; traditional Chinese: 五七幹校) were a system of rural communes throughout mainland China established during the Cultural Revolution. The aim was to train Chinese Communist Party (CCP) Cadres to have a thorough understanding of the rural proletarian work ethic— for government cadres to work towards a communal good while purging their more bourgeois elements. This was achieved through two means: through manual agricultural labour and close study of Marxist and Maoist texts.

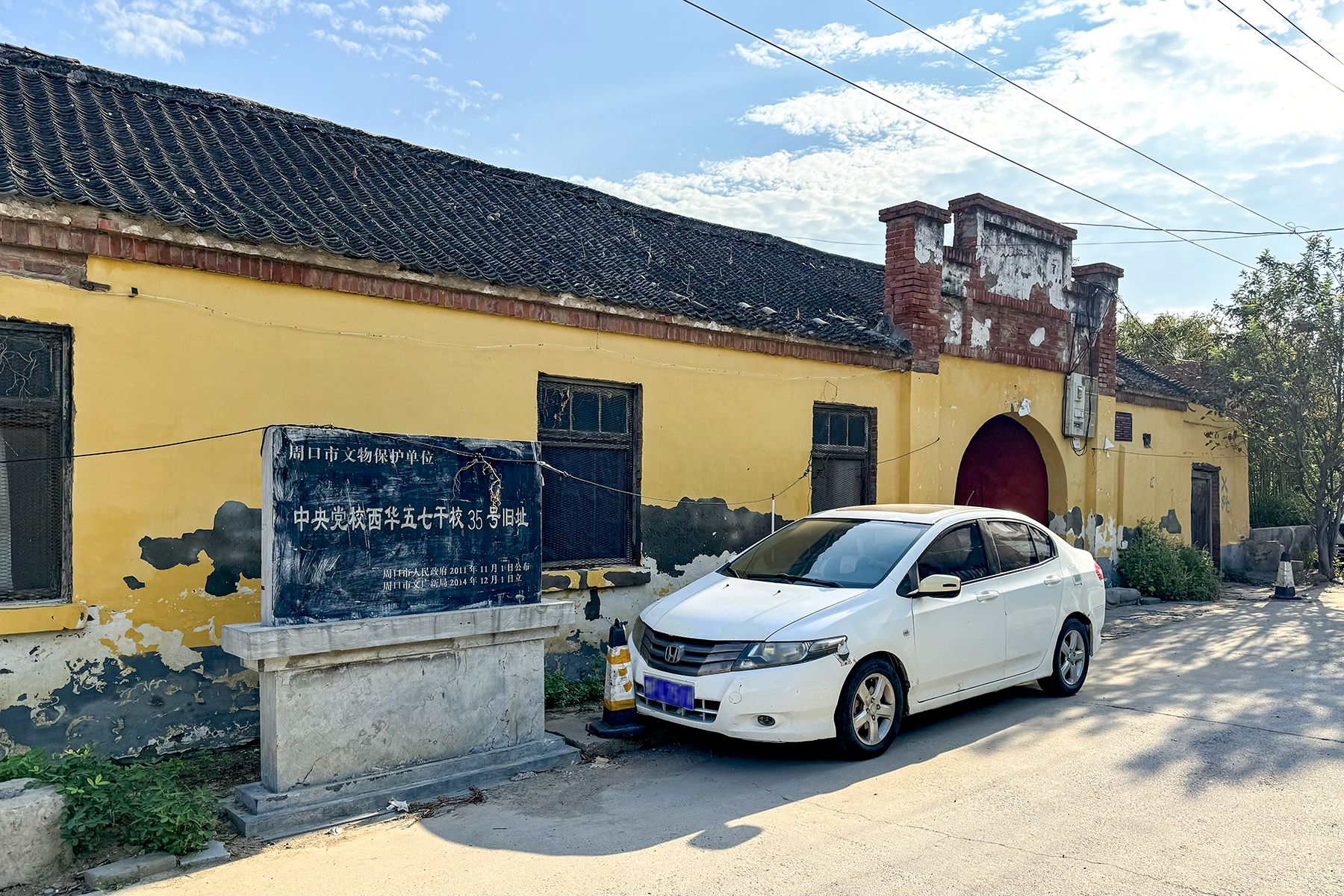
No. 35 of the Xihua May Seventh Cadre School of The Central Party School of CPC

From 1968 to 1976, millions of people— government cadres, doctors, artists, writers, scientists, teachers, and academics— were sent to these rural communes throughout the country. While most individuals were socially and politically pressured to attend, there were also those who volunteered, and others who applied but were rejected. The aim was to integrate with and learn from poor and lower-middle class peasants.

Unlike the Laogai or Laojiao labour camps, the May Seventh Cadre Schools were not intended as a system of penal servitude. Rather, it was a means of ideological reformation for cadres and intellectuals, some of whom fell under the categories of "capitalist roaders," "reactionary academic authorities," or "rightists".

By 1975, there were approximately 3,000 operational cadre schools in China, at least one in nearly every province.

== Origins of term ==
The term "May Seventh Cadre School" can be traced to two original interpretations.

The first, and most prominent, was that the term was derived from Mao Zedong's 1966 May Seventh Directive, which was a response to Lin Biao on improving soldier training within the General Logistics Department. In it, Mao addressed the People's Liberation Army (PLA) and individuals from all trades and professional sectors to participate in areas other than their own. In particular, he urged individuals to educate themselves on agricultural, industrial, and military concerns and production, as an extension of the wider Down to the Countryside Movement.

Eight days later, the CCP Central Committee forwarded the document to all party members with the note, "The letter Comrade Mao Zedong wrote to Comrade Lin Biao is a historically important document. This is a new development in Marxism and Leninism." Recalling the experience of the revolutionary base areas during the Second Sino-Japanese War, Mao wrote that the People's Liberation Army should not only focus on military matters, but should serve as a broader school which would provide opportunities for political study, agricultural work, and mass production.

As mentioned in multiple speeches and directives during and prior to 1966, it was integral to Mao that government cadres work and live amongst the working class, to keep sight of the needs and conditions of the majority population of China.

In his view, these activities would integrate the people and the military, enabling millions of troops to also advance civilian activities. According to Mao, workers should take production as their first priority but should likewise be trained in military affairs and culture, and should take an active role in political matters such as the Four Clean-ups Movement. Farmers and students should likewise be involved in broader matters than agricultural production and traditional academic study. Thus while it did not specifically concern itself with the training of cadre or rehabilitation of wayward cadre, the May Seventh Directive broadly advocates for a polytechnical culture.

A second, less prominent interpretation is that May Seventh Cadre Schools take their name from that of the first such cadre school, which was established on May 7, 1968 (11). In this regard, academic Sing-Nan Fen observes that unlike the May Seventh Directive, a directive issued by Mao on October 4, 1968, addresses cadre training specifically:

"Sending the masses of cadres to do manual work gives them an excellent opportunity to study once again; this should be done by all cadres except those who are too old, too weak, ill or disabled. Cadres at work should also go group by group to do manual work."

== Development ==
The Cultural Revolution sought to address the disconnect between the people and the bureaucracy. Among the Maoist prescriptions for addressing this "bureaucratism" was through requiring officials and other intellectual workers to participate regularly in labor, based on the rationale that such participation would prevent them from becoming "divorced from the masses." May Seventh Cadre Schools were an institutionalized means of implementing this concept. They sought to erase distinctions between mental and physical work.

They became prominent topics in Chinese journals and newspapers and a feature of Chinese political and public life during the Cultural Revolution. During this period, they were acclaimed for their role in countering bureaucratism. Between 1968 and 1976, millions of people attended May Seventh Cadre Schools. These included many Communist Party officials and cadre who had resisted the policies of the Cultural Revolution.

Historian Maurice Meisner writes, "Tilling virgin lands and living a spartan life for several years, it was hoped, would cure them of their bureaucratic habits before they were returned to their official posts." May Seventh Cadre Schools were thus intended as a means to ease tensions between the masses and the CCP.

== History ==
The first May Seventh Cadre School, the Liuhe School was established on May 7, 1968. It was located in Heilongjiang Province, and was established by the Heilongjiang Provincial Revolutionary Committee. From 1968 to its closure on May 8, 1974, the Liuhe school was recorded to have trained over 5,600 cadres, 2,500 in leadership positions.

Following the example of the Liuhe School, 3,000 more such cadre schools would open throughout the country.

Figures for the May Seventh School in Eastern Peking show that 3,300 cadres were trained and 'graduated' from the school between November 7, 1968, to January 7, 1973. During a visit to the school in January 1973, Professor James C.F. Wang of the University of Hawaii, noted that there were 350 enrolled cadres, most of whom were males in their mid-thirties. Additionally, he observed that the majority fit into three occupational groups: "1. cadres associated with municipal administrative bureaux for the district of Eastern Peking, 2. leading cadres from schools, factories, hospitals and clinics and, 3. teachers and support personnel from the school district."

At the Nanniwan May 7th Cadre School in Shaanxi Province, 476 cadres were enrolled by November 1968. The school building was developed over two years, and opened officially in March, 1970. The original group of cadres who constructed the school 'graduated' and were sent home. A group of 600 new cadres were enrolled in their place. At the time of journalist Alexander Casella's 1971 fall visit, there were 560 enrolled cadres, 500 of whom were party members, and 34 of whom were women. The average age of those enrolled was around forty, but individuals ranged from their early twenties to mid-fifties. 1,100 cadres had graduated in previous years.

After 1969, May Seventh Cadre Schools began placing an increased emphasis on the study of communist doctrine. This arose from a growing concern that cadres and intellectuals could not be properly 'reeducated' without the fundamentals of communist theory. Proponents of greater focus on manual labor cited Mao's May Seventh Directive, while proponents of greater focus on theoretical study cited a later directive by Mao to "study conscientiously, [and] become expert in Marxism." Ultimately, manual labor remained the core focus of May Seventh Cadre Schools countrywide while some schools did incorporate more theoretical study.

In April 1974, The Hunan Province Revolutionary Committee assembled a reading list to be used by all May Seventh Cadre Schools. Such titles included The Communist Manifesto, Anti Dühring, and The Civil War in France, among many others.

Towards the end, the Schools had also become a way for government officials and Committee members to seek out talented and hardworking cadres. Upon their return from the schools, many were given more responsibilities and promoted in their jobs.

Following the Lin Biao Incident in 1971, Zhou Enlai expedited the 'graduation' of cadres and intellectuals to return them to their former work positions.

The institutional status of May Seventh Cadre Schools became uncertain after Mao's death. On November 9, 1978, People's Daily reported that Beijing and Shanghai authorities were exempting technical and scientific cadre from being required to attend May Seventh Cadre Schools which focused primarily on manual labor.

The May Seventh Cadre Schools were officially abolished by the State Council in February 1979. May Seventh Cadre Schools that occupied secondary schools, junior colleges, or had uncultivated agricultural land had to rescind the property and vacate.

== Conditions ==
The typical duration of stay at the May Seventh Cadre Schools ranged from approximately six months to two years. The length of stay typically depended on one's career, age, physical health, status, connections, and personal reputation.

Cadres continued to earn their previous salaries but had to set aside a small monthly boarding fee. Salaries were typically saved, sent home to family, or used to purchase local goods. They were also allowed home visits biweekly and every long weekend. Some schools, such as the Eastern Peking school, provided transportation for home visits, but with an extensive check-out system.

Once established, the schools adopted a militant structure; cadres were organized into battalions, companies, and platoons. It was a self-sufficient commune system in which those attending housed and fed themselves and each other. The first group of cadres to arrive at the newly established schools were responsible for constructing houses, building the surrounding infrastructure, paving roads, rearing livestock, and establishing appropriate farming conditions on previously unoccupied, rented, or borrowed land. Cadres who arrived in subsequent groups continued to maintain and build upon infrastructure and agriculture. Manual labor was emphasized not just for its productive value, but also because it was seen as a tempering influence or mechanism for personal transformation. Cadres who were "old, weak, sick, and disabled" but were sent to the schools regardless, were allocated easier, less physically demanding tasks.

Sing-Nan Fen, a former Professor at the University of Nebraska, quoted one cadre's experience in his writing:

"In November of last year, we came in high spirits to the May 7 cadre school situated beside Sung-yang Lake. However, quite a number of our people were stunned by the sight upon their arrival. They had never expected that they would not find here a single field, a single house, or even a brick or a tile... Without dormitories we put up huts of reeds and bamboo. But what huts they were! When the wind was blowing hard outside, we would be exposed to breezes inside; when it was raining heavily, the water would drizzle in; and when there was a snow fall, the inside would turn white with snow flakes... Battling the wilderness we cut reeds and bamboo and dug the mountains to fill in the lake. We built homes, opened up fields, raised pigs and bred fish."

In the evenings, after physical labour, cadres were required daily to participate in theoretical seminar style discussions of Marxist and Maoist works. It was standard to conduct regular progress reports for individuals following discussions. At night, individuals slept together on earthen kangs, or heated brick beds, where many subsequently experienced frostbite or carbon monoxide poisoning during the winter months.

Many doctors and nurses in training, termed Barefoot Doctors, were sent to May Seventh Cadre Schools in lieu of a full-term medical residency. The background notes of Yang Jiang's famous memoir, Six Chapters from My Life Downunder, states:

" ... The regular training period of a medical student, lasting six to seven years, was considered much too long and wasteful. The pre-medical courses and theoretical teaching, therefore, were suspended so that a greater number of students could be turned out within a short period of time by learning the treatment of the most common forms of illness with the air of a rudimentary knowledge and acupuncture."

In the case of medical emergencies that could not be dealt with on-site, it was very challenging to acquire permission to register for a hospital visit. This was to prevent individuals from escaping the cadre school.
