= Six Records of a Floating Life =

1877 autobiography by Shen Fu

- A 1946 edition cover
- Author: Shen Fu
- Original title: 浮生六記
- Translator: Lin Yutang, Shirley M. Black, Leonard Pratt and Su-Hui Chiang, Graham Sanders
- Language: Literary Chinese
- Genre: Autobiography
- Set in: Suzhou, 1780s–1807
- Published: 1877
- Publisher: Wang Tao
- Publication place: Qing China
- English publication date: 1936
- Dewey Decimal: 895.144
- LC Class: PL2724.H4 Z46513
- Original text: 浮生六記 at Chinese Wikisource

Six Records of a Floating Life
- Chinese: 浮生六記
- Literal meaning: fleeting life, six chronicles
Transcriptions
Standard Mandarin
- Hanyu Pinyin: fúshēng liù jì
- Wade–Giles: Fu^{2}-shêng^{1} Liu^{4} Chi^{4}

Six Records of a Floating Life (Chinese: 浮生六記, Fúshēng liù jì), also translated into English as Six Records of a Life Adrift, is an autobiography by Shen Fu (沈復, 1763–1825), who lived in Changzhou (now Suzhou) during the Qing dynasty. The four extant records are "Wedded Bliss", "The Little Pleasures of Life", "Sorrow", and "The Joys of Travel". Two further "records" are lost (or perhaps were never completed): "A History of Life at Zhongshan" and "The Way of Living".

Yang Yin, the brother-in-law of the prominent writer Wang Tao, found the incomplete manuscript of the work at a stall selling second-hand books. He gave the four parts to Wang Tao, who was in charge of the Shanghai newspaper Shen Bao. Wang Tao published the manuscript in letterpress in 1877, whereupon it became an instant bestseller. The "Fourth Record" was written in 1808, so the book is believed to be finished sometime after that date. Based on the index, scholars have been able to determine that the fifth record was intended to be called "A History of Life at Chungshan" and the sixth was intended to be called "The Way of Living". The fifth and sixth sections have never been found, despite various fraudulent claims.

The phrase "floating life" (浮生 fúshēng) originates from the preface to a poem by the Tang-era poet Li Bai: "This floating life is but as a dream; how much longer can we enjoy our happiness?"

== Style ==
A page from a 19th century printed edition of Six Records of a Floating Life

A page from an early 20th century printed edition

The book is written in what translator Graham Sanders calls "the literary language of poetry, essays and official histories rather than in the more verbose vernacular language used for the popular lengthy novels and dramas of the Ming and Qing dynasties". According to Sanders, this choice allowed Shen Fu to "slip readily into a poetic lyrical mode," although he is also able to address topics as diverse as "gardening, finance, social roles of women, tourism, literary criticism, prostitution, class relations, and family dynamics."

== Outline ==
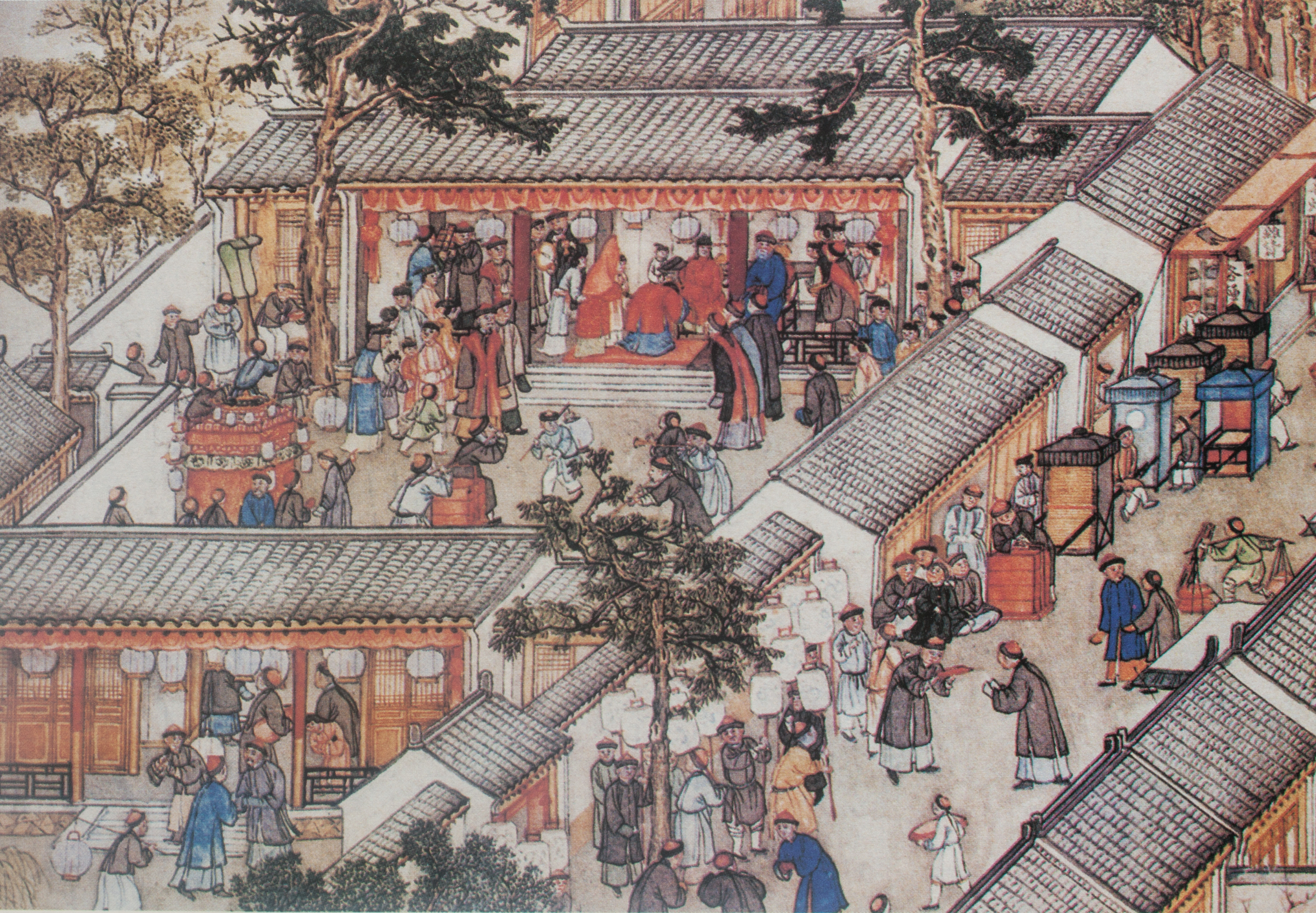
A marriage in 18th-century Suzhou (from the painting Prosperous Suzhou)

The four extant records are:

1. "Wedded Bliss" (閨房記樂 guīfáng jì lè, "Record of Boudoir Music"), in which the author mainly puts the focus on his wife Chen Yun (陳芸), with whom Shen Fu fell in love when they were both young. Although Chen Yun is not considered beautiful, she pursues beauty in other areas. She considers painting and embroidering to be necessary to composing poetry, and regards a simple life as an ideal existence. Shen Fu considers her to be not only his wife but also his close friend who can share in his hobbies and his feelings, which was considered an unorthodox approach to marriage in Chinese society at the time.
2. "The Little Pleasures of Life" (閑情記趣 xiánqíng jì qù, "Record of Leisure and Fun"), which gives a vivid description of the leisure activities enjoyed by Shen Fu: the joys of his childhood, his adult life cultivating flowers, and his experiences of composing poems with other scholars. He tended to be close to nature in childhood, but in adulthood he had very little time to focus on nature, and was often chained to worldly possessions. Many of the episodes in this section are involved with discussions of aesthetic experiences.
3. "Sorrow" (坎坷記愁 kǎnkě jì chóu, "Bumpy Record of Sorrow"), in which Shen Fu points out that most of his frustrations are due to his uprightness and his commitment to words. Though this chapter opens with the author's own sorrow, its content also addresses the difficulties of Chen Yun's life; which also grows out of her character, and with the author’s endless love for his wife and his resentment over her unfair fate.
4. "The Joys of Travel" (浪遊記快 làng yóujì kuài, "Quick Travel Records of Joy") portrays beautiful scenic spots that the author has visited, and records anecdotes, local customs and historical allusions. Shen Fu expounds his belief that it is the gaining of experience that counts, rather than following what others have said.

== Translations ==
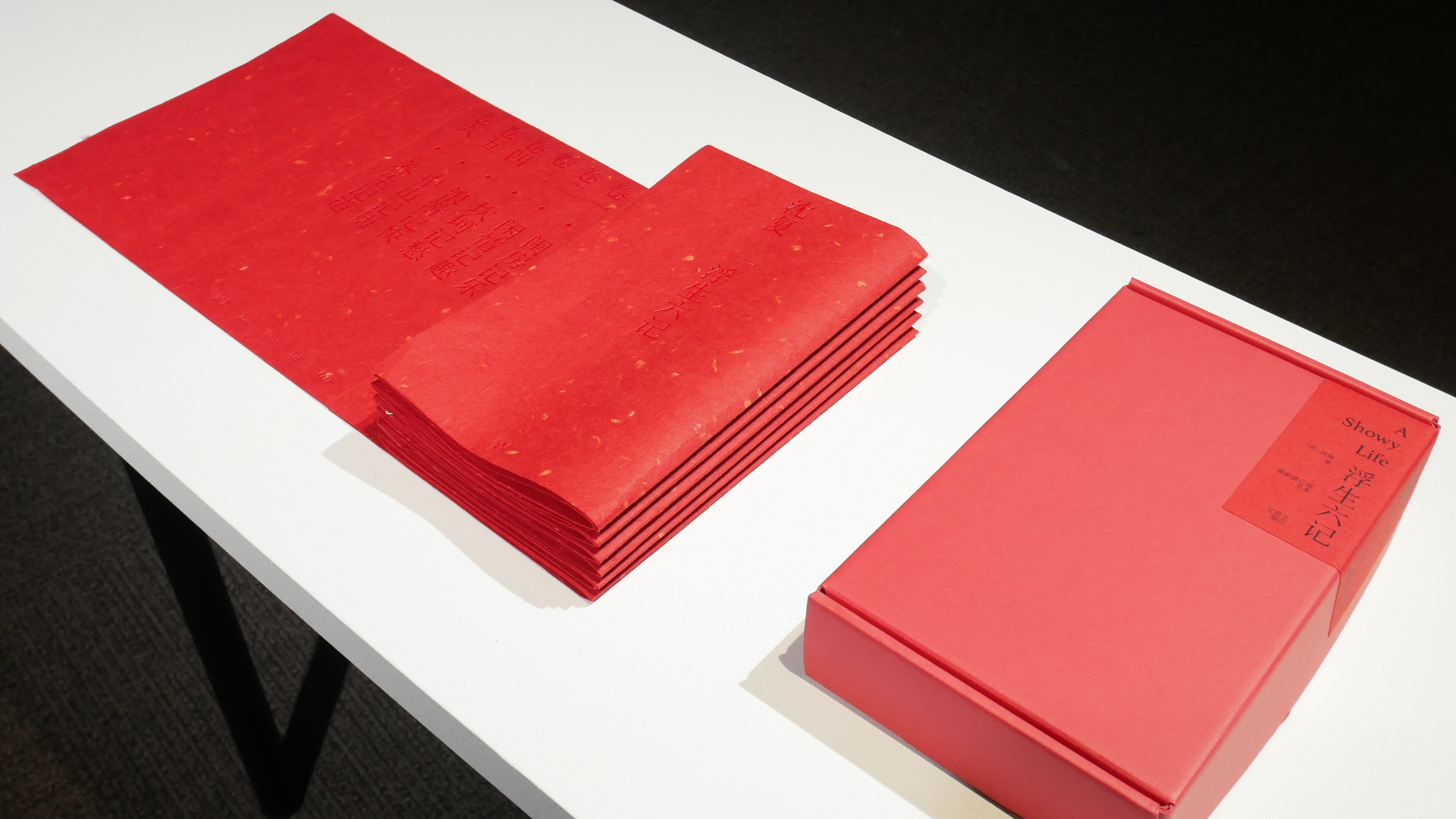
Chapter lists of Six Records of a Floating Life (with title translated as "A Showy Life") displayed in Songshan Cultural and Creative Park, Taipei.

English

- Six Chapters of a Floating Life (Shanghai, 1936) - translated by Lin Yutang
  - Reprinted in The Wisdom of China and India by Lin Yutang (New York: Random House, 1942)
- Chapters from a Floating Life: The Autobiography of a Chinese Artist (Oxford University Press, 1960) - translated by Shirley M. Black
- Six Records of a Floating Life (New York: Viking Press, 1983) - translated by Leonard Pratt and Su-Hui Chiang ISBN 0140444297
  - Also reissued by Penguin Classics
- Six Records of a Life Adrift (Indianapolis: Hackett Publishing, 2011) - translated by Graham Sanders ISBN 1603841989.

German

- Sechs Aufzeichnungen über ein unstetes Leben (Müller & Kiepenheuer, 1989) ISBN 3-7833-8046-4
- Sechs Aufzeichnungen über ein unstetes Leben (Frankfurt am Main, Wien: Büchergilde Gutenberg, 1990) - translated by Rainer Schwarz ISBN 3-7632-3666-X
- Aufzeichnungen aus einem flüchtigen Leben (Matthes & Seitz Berlin, 2019) ISBN 9783957576903

French

- Six secrets au fil inconstant des jours (Bruxelles, Éditions F. Larcier, 1966) - translated by Pierre Ryckmans ISBN 9782709631457
- Récits d'une vie fugitive: Mémoires d'un lettré fou (Gallimard / Unesco, 1986) - translated by Jacques Reclus

Danish

- Kapitler af et flygtigt liv (Omstag, 1986)

Italian

- Sei racconti di vita irreale (1955)
- Racconti di vita irreale (Marsilio, 1993) - translated by Lionello Lanciotti ISBN 9788831757478

Korean

- 부생 육기 :심 복 자서전 (1979)

Spanish

- Relatos de una vida sin rumbo (1985)
- Seis estampas de una vida a la deriva (Chindia Plataforma, 2012) ISBN 9788415577485

Dutch

- Verslagen van een vlietend leven: Biografie van een liefde (Chinaboek, 1989) - translated by Daan Bronkhorst ISBN 9071800067

Hebrew

- החיים הסחופים

Swedish

- Pilblad i strömmen: En kinesisk konstnärs självbiografi (1961)

Japanese

- 《浮生六記：うき世のさが》沈復作，佐藤春夫·松枝茂夫譯，東京：岩波書店，1938年9月

Malaysian

- Hidup bagaikan mimpi (Fou sheng liu chi): Riwayat hidup sa-orang pelukis dan sasterawan tionghoa (Oxford University Press, 1961)

Czech

- Šest historií prchavého života (Plzákovo nakladatelství, 1944)

Russian

- Шесть записок о быстротечной жизни (Наука, Moscow, 1979) - translated by Kirina Ivanovna Golygina

Vietnamese

- Phù Sinh Lục Ký (Nxb. Hội Nhà Văn, Hà Nội, 2018) - translated by Châu Hải Đường ISBN 9786049724169

Polish

- O upływającym życiu: Opowieść w sześciu rozdziałach (Państwowy Instytut Wydawniczy, 2019) - translated by Katarzyna Sarek ISBN 9788366272156

== Editions ==
Six Records of a Floating Life gained much critical acclaim during the late Qing–Republic transitions and the May Fourth era when intellectuals such as Yu Pingbo, Zhu Ziqing, Hu Shih, Ye Shengtao, Zhou Zuoren, Liang Qichao and Lin Yutang praised the work for its formal innovations, its emotional sincerity and soulfulness, and its resistance to moral didacticism.

The work was especially re-printed and evaluated during the 20th century. It continues to have a large, devoted fan base and attracts many enthusiasts in modern China.

Covers of printed editions of Six Records of a Floating Life
A late 19th century edition

A 1924 edition

A 1928 edition

A 1933 edition

A 1933 edition

A 1934 edition

A 1941 edition

A 1942 edition

A 1943 edition

A 1948 edition

A 1949 edition

== Plays ==
Six Records of a Floating Life has also been adapted as an experimental play by East Meets West Mime, mixing elements of mime, dance, pop, and theatre. Ballerina Lindzay Chan played the character of Chen Yun, while Philip Fok played Shen Fu.
