= Limited Views =

Collection of essays

Limited Views or Guanzhui bian (simplified Chinese: 管锥编; traditional Chinese: 管錐編; pinyin: Guǎnzhuī biān) is a four-volume collection of essays and reading notes about early Chinese literature by Qian Zhongshu, a renowned 20th-century Chinese literary scholar and writer. The work was written during the 1960s and 1970s, the height of Cultural Revolution and touched upon I Ching, Mao Commentary, Zuo zhuan, Records of the Grand Historian, Taiping guangji, Laozi, Liezi, Jiaoshi Yilin, Chu Ci, Quan shanggu sandai Qin Han Sanguo Liuchao wen, and other Chinese classics. Qian adopted the method of research comparing Chinese and Western culture and did extensive and detailed textual work. Half of the work is concerned with Taiping guangji and Quan shanggu sandai Qin Han Sanguo Liuchao wen. More than 4000 writers and 10,000 titles were cited in this work. Meanwhile, Qian also employed his wide knowledge of social sciences and humanities. Limited Views was published officially in September 1979 by Zhonghua Book Company in Beijing.

== Bibliography ==
- Limited Views: Essays on Ideas and Letters, Ronald C. Egan, Pʻu-sheng Chʻen, Qian Zhongshu, Harvard Univ Asia Center, 1998
