= Xu Yang (Qing dynasty) =

Xu Yang (simplified Chinese: 徐扬; traditional Chinese: 徐揚; 1712–after 1777) was a court painter to the Qianlong Emperor of the Qing dynasty. A native of Suzhou, he was active ca. 1750–1776.

He painted 12 large silk scrolls, including The Qianlong Emperor's Southern Inspection Tour and Prosperous Suzhou.
