= Shen Fu =

- 沈復
- Born: 26 December 1763; Suzhou, Jiangsu, Qing China
- Died: After 1825
- Occupation: Yamen
- Spouse: Chen Yun (m. 1780)
- Writing career
- Pen name: Sanbai
- Language: Literary Chinese
- Period: 1780s?–1807
- Genre: Autobiography
- Notable work: Six Records of a Floating Life

Shen Fu
- Traditional Chinese: 沈復
- Simplified Chinese: 沈复
Transcriptions
Standard Mandarin
- Hanyu Pinyin: Shěn Fù
- IPA: [ʂə̀n fû]

Alternative Chinese name
- Chinese: 三白
Transcriptions
Standard Mandarin
- Hanyu Pinyin: Sānbái

Shen Fu (Chinese: 沈復; 26 December 1763 – after 1825), courtesy name Sanbai (三白), was a Chinese writer of the Qing Dynasty, best known for his autobiography Six Records of a Floating Life.

== Life ==
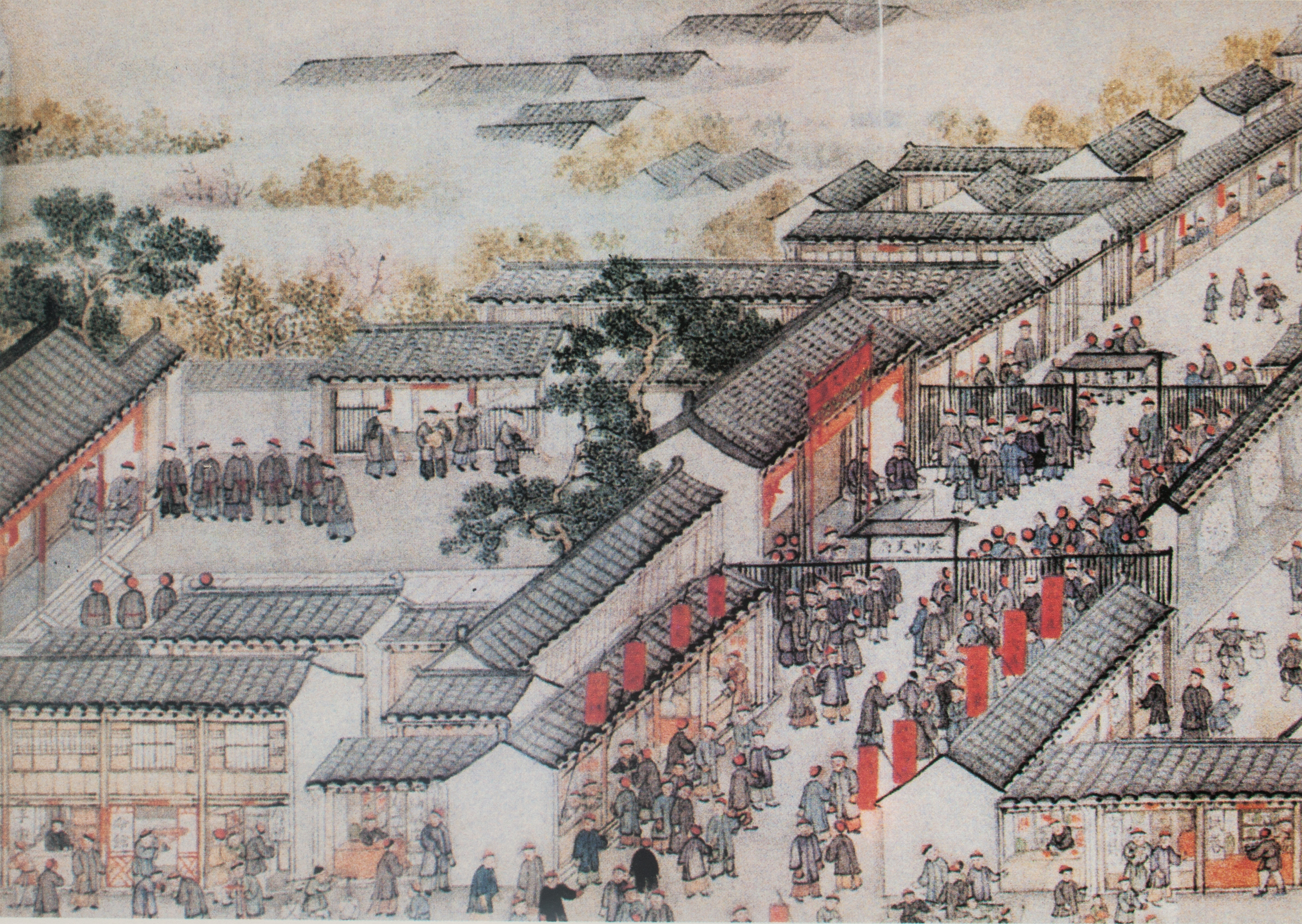
Dwelling of a yamen in Suzhou, 18th century (from the painting Prosperous Suzhou)

Shen Fu was born in Changzhou (长洲, in Suzhou, Jiangsu province) in 1763. He was known as a great writer and wrote one of the best known descriptions of everyday life during the Qing Dynasty, Six Records of a Floating Life. In this text, which was completed in 1807, Shen Fu describes the gentle personality of his wife, Chen Yun (陈芸), and his love for her. He also chronicles the rejection of Chen Yun by his parents and her untimely death. Shen Fu was a government clerk, a yamen private secretary.

The work is considered a great classic of Chinese literature.
