= Boxer Indemnity Scholarship (United Kingdom) =

Scholarship for Chinese students to be educated in the UK

- Traditional Chinese: 庚子賠款獎學金
- Simplified Chinese: 庚子赔款奖学金
Transcriptions
Standard Mandarin
- Hanyu Pinyin: Gēngzǐ Péikuǎn Jiǎngxuéjīn
- Wade–Giles: Keng-tzu P'ei-k'uan Chiang-hsüeh-chin

Alternative Chinese name
- Chinese: 英庚子
Transcriptions
Standard Mandarin
- Hanyu Pinyin: Yīnggēngzǐ
- Wade–Giles: Ying-keng-tzu

The Boxer Indemnity Scholarship by the United Kingdom (Chinese: 庚子賠款獎學金; pinyin: Gēngzǐ Péikuǎn Jiǎngxuéjīn or simply Chinese: 英庚子) was a scholarship program for Chinese students to study in the United Kingdom, funded by the remittance of the Boxer Indemnity from China to the United Kingdom. It was established after the United States' Boxer Indemnity Scholarship.

== History ==
Unlike the U.S., the remittance of the indemnity sparked a debate in the Parliament of the United Kingdom over how to allocate the funds, with options including education and other areas such as railways.

== Recipients ==
Name	Year	University	Footnotes
Qian Zhongshu		the University of Oxford	also known as Chien Chung-Shu
