= Qian Zhongshu =

Chinese literary scholar and writer (1910–1998)

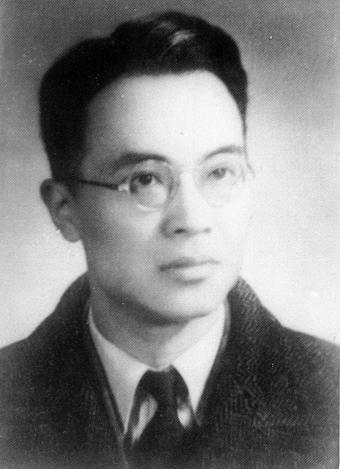
- Qian in the 1940s
- Born: November 21, 1910; Wusih, Kiangsu, Qing Empire
- Died: December 19, 1998 (aged 88); Beijing, People's Republic of China
- Education: Tsinghua University (BA); Exeter College, Oxford (BLitt)
- Spouse: Yang Jiang (m. 1935)
- Children: Qian Yuan
- Parent: Qian Jibo

Chinese name
- Traditional Chinese: 錢鍾書
- Simplified Chinese: 钱锺书 (Note: From the 1950s, in mainland China the two traditional characters 鍾 and 鐘 were both officially simplified into the character 钟, but since 2003 the two characters have been separated again, as 锺 and 钟 respectively. 钱锺书 is thus the current standard simplified form and is used, for example, in works by Qian's wife Yang Jiang, although the form 钱钟书, which was standard from the 1950s until 2003, remains in widespread use.)
Transcriptions
Standard Mandarin
- Hanyu Pinyin: Qián Zhōngshū
- Wade–Giles: Ch'ien^{2} Chung^{1}-shu^{1}
- IPA: [tɕʰjɛ̌n ʈʂʊ́ŋ.ʂú]
- Courtesy name: Zheliang (哲良); Mocun (默存)
- Art name: Huaiju (槐聚)

Qian Zhongshu (November 21, 1910 – December 19, 1998), also romanized as Ch'ien Chung-shu or Dzien Tsoong-su, was a Chinese literary scholar and writer. He was known for his satirical novel Fortress Besieged; his rarefied, polyglot nonfiction; and his role in translating Mao Zedong’s writings into English.

== Life ==
Most of what is known about Qian's early life relies on an essay written by his wife Yang Jiang. Born in Wuxi, Qian Zhongshu was the son of Qian Jibo (錢基博), a conservative Confucian scholar, landed gentry, and Chinese language professor at Tsinghua, St. John's University, and National Central University (Nanking), respectively. By family tradition, Qian Zhongshu grew up under the care of his eldest uncle, who did not have a son. Qian was initially named Yangxian (仰先; lit. "respect the ancients"), with the courtesy name Zheliang (哲良; "sagacious and upright"). However, when he was one year old, in accordance with a tradition of zhuazhou, practiced in many parts of China, he was given a few objects laid out in front of him for his "grabbing"; he grabbed a book. His uncle thusly renamed him Zhongshu, literally "fond of books," while Yangxian became his intimate name. Qian was a rather talkative child. His father later changed his courtesy name to Mocun (默存, lit. "to keep silent"), in the hope that he would talk less.

Both Qian's name and courtesy name forecasted his future life. While he remained talkative when talking about literature with friends, he kept silent most of the time on politics and social activities. Qian was indeed very fond of books. When he was young, his uncle often brought him along to teahouses during the day. There, Qian was left alone to read storybooks on folklore and historical events, which he would repeat to his cousins upon returning home.

At the age of 6, Qian went to Qinshi primary school and stayed home for less than half a year due to illness. At the age of 7, Qian studied in a private school of a relative's family. Due to inconvenience, he quit school a year later and was taught by his uncle. When Qian was 11, he entered the first grade at Donglin Elementary School, and his uncle died this year. He continued living with his widowed aunt, even though their living conditions drastically worsened as her family's fortunes dwindled. Under the strict tutelage of his father, Qian mastered classical Chinese. At the age of 14, Qian left home to attend Taowu Middle School, an English-language missionary school in Suzhou. In 1927, Qian was admitted to Furen Middle School, an English-language missionary school in Wuxi. At the age of 20, Qian's aunt died.

Despite struggling in mathematics, Qian excelled in both Chinese and English languages in the entrance exam to the Tsinghua University, which admitted him into the Department of Foreign Languages in 1929, ranking 57 out of 174 male students. One of his few friends was the budding Sinologist and comparatist Achilles Fang. Qian also frequently cut classes, though he more than made up for this in Tsinghua's large library, which he boasted of having "read through." It was probably in his college days that Qian began his lifelong habit of collecting quotations and taking reading notes. At Tsinghua, Qian studied with professors, such as Wu Mi, George T. Yeh, Wen Yuan-ning, and others.

In 1932, he met Yang Jiang. In 1933, Qian became engaged to Yang, and they married in 1935. Two years after Qian graduated from Tsinghua University in 1933, Qian taught at Kwanghua University in Shanghai and contributed to English-language publications such as The China Critic.

In 1935, Qian received a Boxer Indemnity Scholarship to further his studies abroad. Together with his wife, Qian headed for the University of Oxford. After spending two years at Exeter College, Oxford, he received a Bachelor of Letters. Shortly after his daughter Qian Yuan (錢瑗) was born in England in 1937, he studied for one more year in the University of Paris in France. In 1938, he returned to China and was appointed as a full professor at Tsinghua University, which, due to the war, had relocated to Kunming, Yunnan province and become part of National Southwestern Associated University. In 1939, after Qian returned to Shanghai to visit his relatives, he directly went to Hunan to take care of his sick father and temporarily left Southwestern Associated University. In 1941, Qian was temporarily trapped in Shanghai.

Owing to the unstable situation during the Second Sino-Japanese War and the Chinese Civil War, Qian did not hold any long-term jobs. However, it was during the late 1930s and 1940s that he wrote most of his books, including Fortress Besieged and the story collection Human, Beast, Ghost, as well as the essay collection Written in the Margins of Life. After WWII, in the late 1940s, he worked in the National Central Library in Nanjing, editing its English-language publication, Philobiblon.

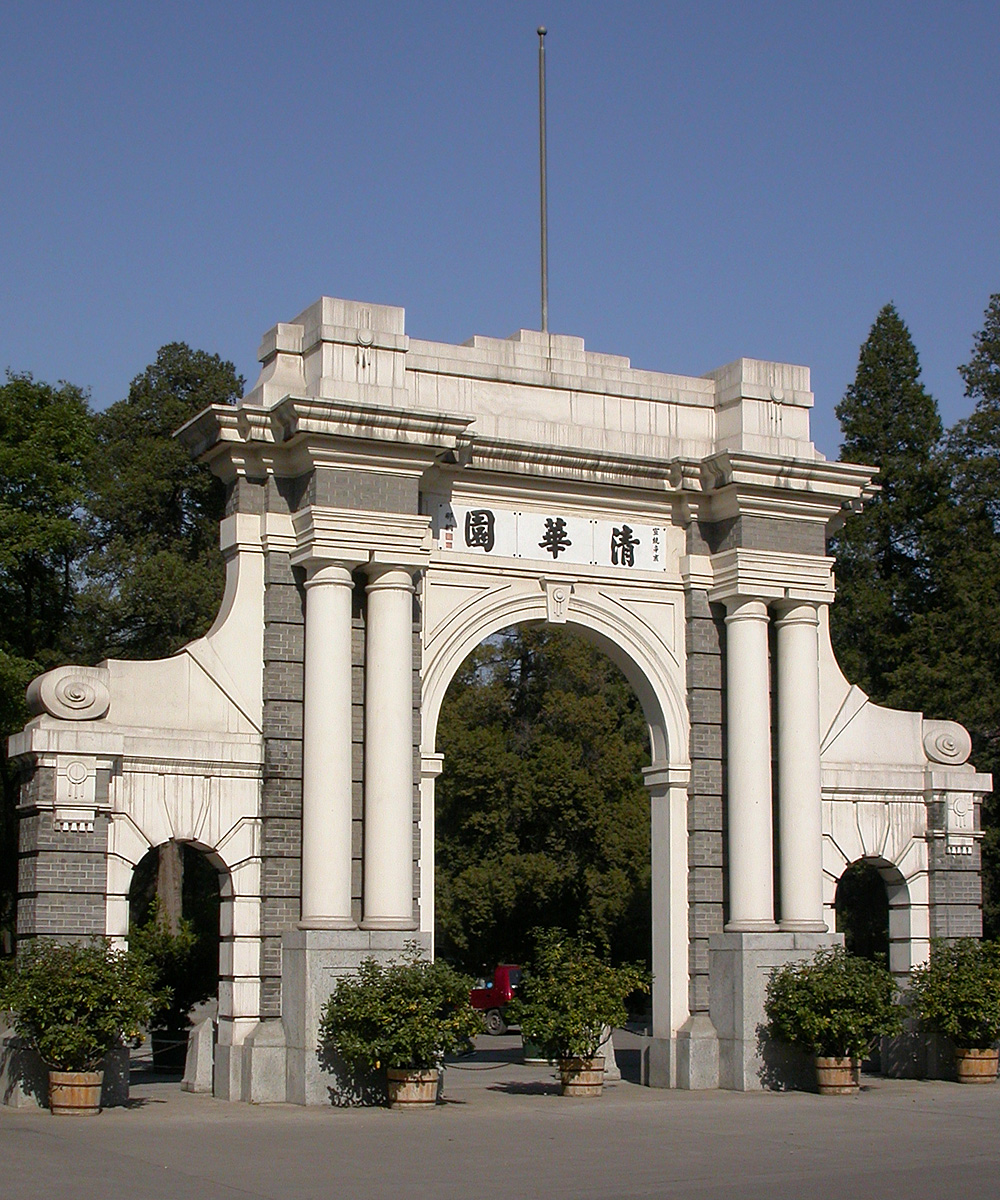
The old gate of Tsinghua University, where Qian Zhongshu studied and taught

In 1949, Qian commenced a teaching job at Tsinghua University. The 1952 reorganization of higher education in China saw Tsinghua become a science and technology-specific institution, with its liberal arts faculties largely merged into Peking University. Qian was relieved of teaching duties and worked with the Institute of Literary Studies (文學硏究所) at PKU as a senior researcher, with his wife also a researcher there. Additionally, he worked as part of an official team to translate of Mao Zedong's works into English.

During the Cultural Revolution, like many other prominent intellectuals of the time, Qian suffered persecution. Appointed to be a janitor, he was robbed of his favorite pastime, reading. Having no access to books, he had to read his reading notes. He began to form the plan to write Limited Views during this period. Qian, his wife, along with their daughter survived the hardships of Cultural Revolution, but their son-in-law, a history teacher, was driven to suicide.

After the Cultural Revolution, Qian returned to academia. From 1978 to 1980, he visited several universities in Italy, the United States and Japan, impressing his audience with his wit and erudition. In 1982, he was appointed as the deputy director of the Chinese Academy of Social Sciences. He then began working on Limited Views, which occupied the next decade of his life.

While Limited Views established his fame in the academic field, his novel Fortress Besieged introduced him to the public. Fortress Besieged was reprinted in 1980, and became a best-seller. Many illegal reproductions and "continuations" followed. Qian's fame rose to its height when the novel was adapted into a TV serial in 1990, starring Chen Daoming and Ying Da.

Qian consciously kept a distance from the mass media and political figures and played an important role in digitizing Chinese classics late in his life. Readers kept visiting the secluded scholar, and an anecdote goes that Qian when approached by a British admirer, remarked: "Is it necessary for one to know the hen if one loves the eggs it lays?"

Qian was hospitalized in 1994, and his daughter also became ill in 1995. On March 4, 1997, Qian's daughter died of cancer. On December 19, 1998, Qian died in Beijing.

== Former residence ==
Qian's former residence, covering 1,600 square meters, is located at Xinjiexiang #30 and #32 in Wuxi, Nanjing. It was built in 1923 by his grandfather Qian Fujiong. In 1926 his uncle Qian Sunqin built five buildings and several auxiliary rooms on the west side of the back of the house, covering an area of 667.6 square meters. The whole group of buildings are typical Jiangnan courtyard houses. Inside the residence, there are some unique separate buildings, such as Haixu Shulou and Meihua Shuwu. In 2018, it applied for China's significant cultural relics protection units. The former residence has related exhibitions and is open to the public without fees.

== Works ==
Qian lived in Shanghai from 1941 to 1945 under Japanese occupation, when he published most of his works. A collection of short essays, Written in the Margins of Life (寫在人生邊上), was published in 1941. Human, Beast, Ghost (人‧獸‧鬼), a collection of short stories, mostly satiric, was published in 1946. His most celebrated work Fortress Besieged appeared in 1947, but it was not until the 1980s that it received wide attention. On the Art of Poetry, written in classical Chinese, was published in 1948. Fortress Besieged has been translated into English, French, German, Russian, Japanese and Spanish. It represents an alternative strand of modernism, which has long remained hidden and unexamined in the history of modern Chinese literature. "Humans, Beasts, and Ghosts" has been translated into English, French, and Italian.

Besides rendering Mao Zedong's selected works into English, Qian was appointed to produce an anthology of poetry of the Song dynasty when he was working in the Institute of Literary Studies. The Selected and Annotated Song Dynasty Poetry was published in 1958. Despite Qian's quoting Mao Zedong, and his selecting a considerable number of poems that reflect class struggle, the work was criticized for not being Marxist enough. The work was praised highly by the overseas critics, though, especially for its introduction and footnotes. In a new preface for the anthology written in 1988, Qian said that the work was an embarrassing compromise between his personal taste and the prevailing academic atmosphere.

Seven Pieces Patched Together (七缀集), a collection of seven pieces of literary criticism written (and revised) over years in vernacular Chinese, was published in 1984, and has been translated by Duncan Campbell as Patchwork: Seven Essays on Art and Literature. This collection includes the famous essay "Lin Shu's Translation" (林纾的翻译).

Qian's magnum opus is the five-volume Limited Views (管锥编, lit. Pipe-Awl Collection). Begun in the 1980s and published in its current form in the mid-1990s, it is an extensive collection of notes and short essays on poetics, semiotics, literary history and related topics written in classical Chinese. One of the last authors to produce substantial works in classical Chinese, Qian's choice of language was seen as a challenge to the assertion that classical Chinese is incompatible with modern and Western ideas, a popular belief during the May Fourth Movement. Ronald Egan argues that the work contains an implicit negative commentary on the Cultural Revolution.

Besides both modern and classical Chinese, Qian's command of English, German, French, Italian, Spanish and Latin allowed him to construct a towering structure of polyglot and cross-cultural allusions. He took a range of Chinese classical texts as the basis of this work, including the I-Ching, Classic of Poetry, Verses of Chu, The Commentary of Tso, Records of the Grand Historian, Tao Te Ching, Lieh-tzu, Jiaoshi Yilin, Extensive Records of the T'ai-p'ing Era and the Complete Prose of the Pre-Tang Dynasties (全上古三代秦漢三國六朝文), and often shed new light on them through a comparative literary perspective. As he observed: "It is a monumental work of modern scholarship that evinces the author's great learning and his effort to bring the ancient and the modern, Chinese and Western, into mutual illumination."

== Posthumous publications ==
A 13-volume edition of Works of Qian Zhongshu (钱锺书集/钱钟书集) was published in 2001 by Joint Publishing, a hard-covered deluxe edition, in contrast to all of Qian's works published during his lifetime which are cheap paperbacks. The publisher claimed that the edition had been proofread by many experts. One of the most valuable parts of the edition which demonstrating Qian's writing ability while blending humor and irony, titled Marginalias on the Marginalias of Life (写在人生边上的边上), is a collection of Qian's writings previously scattered in periodicals, magazines and other books. The writings collected there are, however, arranged without any visible order.

Other posthumous publications of Qian's works have drawn harsh criticism. The official writing of Supplements to and Revisions of Songshi Jishi began in 1982. In the following ten years, Qian invested a lot of energy to make extensive and in-depth Supplements to and Revisions of Songshi Jishi. The 10-volume Supplements to and Revisions of Songshi Jishi (宋诗纪事补正), published in 2003, was criticized as a shoddy publication. Liaoning People's Publishing House published Qian Zhongshu's ''Supplements to and Revisions of Songshi Jishi in 2003. A facsimile of Qian's holograph has been published in 2005, by another publisher. The facsimiles of parts of Qian's notebooks appeared in 2004, and have similarly drawn criticism on account of being badly edited. In 2005, a collection of Qian's English works was published. Again, it was lashed for its editorial incompetence.

The Commercial Press has, per an agreement with Yang Jiang, begun publishing photoreproductions of Qian Zhongshu's reading notes, totaling several score volumes in both Chinese and foreign languages.

== See also ==
- List of Chinese authors
- Yang Jiang
