= Yang Jiang =

Chinese writer (1911–2016)

- 杨绛
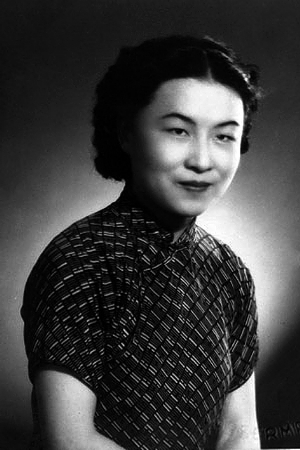
- Yang in 1941
- Born: Yang Jikang (楊季康); 17 July 1911; Beijing, China
- Died: 25 May 2016 (aged 104); Beijing, China
- Education: Soochow University; Tsinghua University; University of Oxford; University of Paris
- Spouse: Qian Zhongshu (m. 1935; died 1998)
- Children: Qian Yuan (1937–1997)
- Parent(s): Yang Yinhang (father); Tang Xuying (mother)

Yang Jiang
- Traditional Chinese: 楊絳
- Simplified Chinese: 杨绛
Transcriptions
Standard Mandarin
- Hanyu Pinyin: Yáng Jiàng
- Wade–Giles: Yang Chiang

Yang Jikang
- Traditional Chinese: 楊季康
- Simplified Chinese: 杨季康
Transcriptions
Standard Mandarin
- Hanyu Pinyin: Yáng Jìkāng

Yang Jiang (Chinese: 杨绛; Wade–Giles: Yang Chiang; 17 July 1911 – 25 May 2016) was a Chinese playwright, author, and translator. She wrote several successful comedies, and was the first Chinese person to produce a complete Chinese version of Miguel de Cervantes' novel Don Quixote.

== Biography ==
She was born in Beijing as Yang Jikang, and grew up in the Jiangnan region. After graduating from Soochow University in 1932, Yang Jiang enrolled in the graduate school of Tsinghua University. There she met Qian Zhongshu. They married in 1935. During 1935–1938, they went abroad to England for further study at Oxford University. In England, Yang gave birth to their daughter Qian Yuan (錢瑗) in 1937. They later studied at Pantheon-Sorbonne University in Paris, France. They often spoke French and English to each other throughout their lives in China.

They returned to China in 1938. Living in Shanghai, she wrote four stage plays: two comedies of manners, Heart's Desire (1943) and Forging the Truth (1944), one farce, Sporting with the World (1947), and the tragedy Windswept Blossoms (1947). After 1949, she taught at the Tsinghua University and made a scholarly study of western literature at Peking University and the Academy of Science. She published this work in 1979 in a compendium: Spring Mud. As authors, literary researchers, and translators, Yang and Qian both made important contributions to the development of Chinese literary culture.

Yang also translated into Chinese three major European works of picaresque fiction: Lazarillo de Tormes (1951), Gil Blas (1956) and Don Quixote (1978). Her Chinese translation of Don Quixote is, as of 2016, still considered the definitive version. After deeming several English and French translations unsuitable, she taught herself Spanish. "If I wanted to be faithful to the original, I had to translate directly from the original," she wrote in 2002. Ms. Yang had completed almost seven out of eight volumes of the translation when Red Guard student militants confiscated the manuscript from her home in Beijing. "I worked with every ounce of energy I could muster, gouging at the earth with a spade, but the only result was a solitary scratch on the surface," Ms. Yang wrote. "The youngsters around me had quite a laugh over that." As the Cultural Revolution subsided, Ms. Yang returned to Beijing to work on "Don Quixote." The nearly completed draft that had been confiscated by Red Guards is said to have been discovered in a pile of scrap paper and returned to Ms. Yang. Published in 1978, it remains widely regarded as the definitive translation of "Don Quixote" in China.

She was also awarded the Civil Order of Alfonso X, the Wise for this by King Juan Carlos in October 1986. Her sister Yang Bi (楊必) (1922–1968) was also a translator.

Her experience doing "reform through labor" in a "cadre school" in Henan from 1969 to 1972, where she was "sent down" with her husband during the Cultural Revolution, inspired her to write Six Chapters from My Life 'Downunder' (1981). This is the book that made her name as a writer in the post-Mao period. In connection with this memoir, she also wrote Soon to Have Tea (將飲茶) (aka Toward Oblivion), which was published in 1983.

In 1988, she published her only novel Baptism (洗澡), which was always connected with Fortress Besieged (圍城), a masterpiece of her husband. Her 2003 memoir We Three (我們仨), recalled memories of her husband and her daughter Qian Yuan, who died of cancer one year before her father's death in 1998. At the age of 96, she published Reaching the Brink of Life (走到人生邊上), a philosophic work whose title in Chinese clearly alludes to her late husband's collection of essays Marginalia to Life (寫在人生邊上).

She turned 100 in July 2011. The novella After the Baptism (洗澡之後), a coda to Baptism, appeared in 2014. On 25 May 2016, Yang died at the age of 104 at Peking Union Medical College Hospital in Beijing.

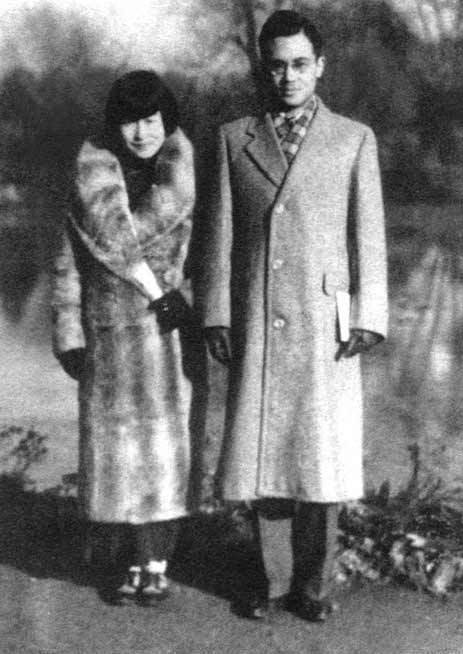
Qian Zhongshu and Yang Jiang in 1936

Contradicting a Chinese saying that it is impossible for a woman to be both a chaste wife and gifted scholar or talented artist, Qian once described Yang as "the most chaste wife and talented girl" in China.

== Works ==
=== Plays ===
- Heart's Desire (稱心如意) (1943).
- Forging the Truth (弄真成假) (1944).
- Sporting with the World (遊戲人間) (1945).
- Windswept Blossoms (風絮) (1947).

=== Novels ===
- Baptism (洗澡)(1988)
- After the Bath (洗澡之後)(2014)

=== Essays ===
- Six Chapters from My Life 'Downunder' (幹校六記) (1981)
- About to Drink Tea (將飲茶) (1987)
- We Three (我們仨) (2003)

Her 2003 essay collection "We Three," about her family life with her late husband and their daughter, was a national bestseller. Yang Jiang's daughter Qian Yuan gave the name of this book We Three. She has written the outline for it, but unfortunately died after five days in 1997. Yang withheld the news of their daughter's death from her husband Qian Zhongshu until his passing in 1998. After her husband's death, Yang compiled and edited his unpublished works, the most celebrated being We Three. The opening line for We three is:

"This is a long dream of ten thousand miles. The scene was so real that it felt like a dream after waking up. But a dream being a dream, is nothing but a dream."

"There is no absolute happiness in human life. Happiness always comes with worry and anxiety,"

- Reaching the Brink of Life (走到人生邊上) (2007)

At the age of 96, Yang surprised the world with Reaching the Brink of Life, a philosophic work whose title alludes to her husband's collection of essays Marginalia to Life. Reaching the Brink of Life is a self-reckoning that may well be Yang's most personal book. The first half of the book is structured as a self-dialogue about life, death, and the afterlife; the second part contains an assortment of family anecdotes and reading notes—the fragments of a life. What emerges from its pages is not merely the predictable inward turn toward self-consolation of a learned person facing death; in Yang's declaration of faith and her insistence that the afterlife be 'fair' is an affirmation of personal metaphysics in a nation that has long promoted collectivism while discouraging religion and 'superstition'.

"Body and soul is a twisted. Together with good evil."

=== Translation work ===
- Gil Blas
- Don Quixote
- Lazarillo de Tormes
- Phaedo

== See also ==
- List of centenarians (authors, poets and journalists)
