= Prosperous Suzhou =

Painting by Xu Yang

- Artist: Xu Yang
- Year: 1759
- Type: Handscroll; ink and color on silk.
- Dimensions: 35.8 cm × 1225 cm (14 in × 482 in)
- Location: Liaoning Provincial Museum, Shenyang

Prosperous Suzhou (simplified Chinese: 姑苏繁华图; traditional Chinese: 姑蘇繁華圖; pinyin: Gūsū Fánhuá Tú), originally entitled Burgeoning Life in a Resplendent Age (simplified Chinese: 盛世滋生图; traditional Chinese: 盛世滋生圖; pinyin: Shèngshì Zīshēng Tú), is an 18th-century scroll painting (handscroll) created in 1759 by the Chinese court painter Xu Yang. Depicting the bustling urban life of Suzhou, it combines Western perspective with traditional Chinese style. It measures 12.25 by 0.36 metres (40.2 by 1.2 feet).

== History ==
The Qianlong Emperor commissioned Prosperous Suzhou after he returned from an inspection trip to the south in 1751. It took several years for Xu Yang, a native of Suzhou, to complete. Prosperous Suzhou was renamed from Burgeoning Life in a Resplendent Age in the 1950s.

== Description ==
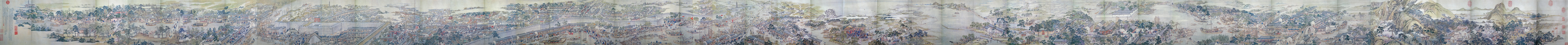
Prosperous Suzhou by Xu Yang

Prosperous Suzhou is a handscroll, a long narrow scroll for displaying a series of scenes. It is twelve meters in length. It is intended to be viewed starting from the right end, by laying it flat on a table and unrolling it. One admires it section for section during the unrolling as if traveling through a landscape, depicting a continuous journey.

European art and its techniques like linear perspective became increasingly influential in China the 18th and 19th centuries. Skillfully composed, Prosperous Suzhou combines Western linear perspective with traditional Chinese compositional devices. The scroll is invaluable from both a historical and an artistic point of view, depicting in intricate detail the mid-18th century topography and customs of Suzhou, allowing modern viewers to visit a Chinese city of 250 years ago.

In his inscription at the end of the scroll, Xu Yang wrote that he painted it in order to depict a peaceful and prosperous reign, and to pay homage to the reign of the Qianlong Emperor. In addition, his inscription describes the scroll as a journey from Mount Lingyan to the city walls of Suzhou, through the city, and ending at Tiger Hill.

The scroll vividly illustrates the visual appearance of the terrain, urban landscapes, and everyday life in an area covering several dozen miles. The middle of the scroll depicts an idealised view of all the activities of the bustling urban center of Suzhou. Viewers can see numerous merchants, traders, barges and passenger boats, as well as dense rows of shops and vendors. More than 4,800 human figures, 2,000 architectural structures, and 400 boats are present.

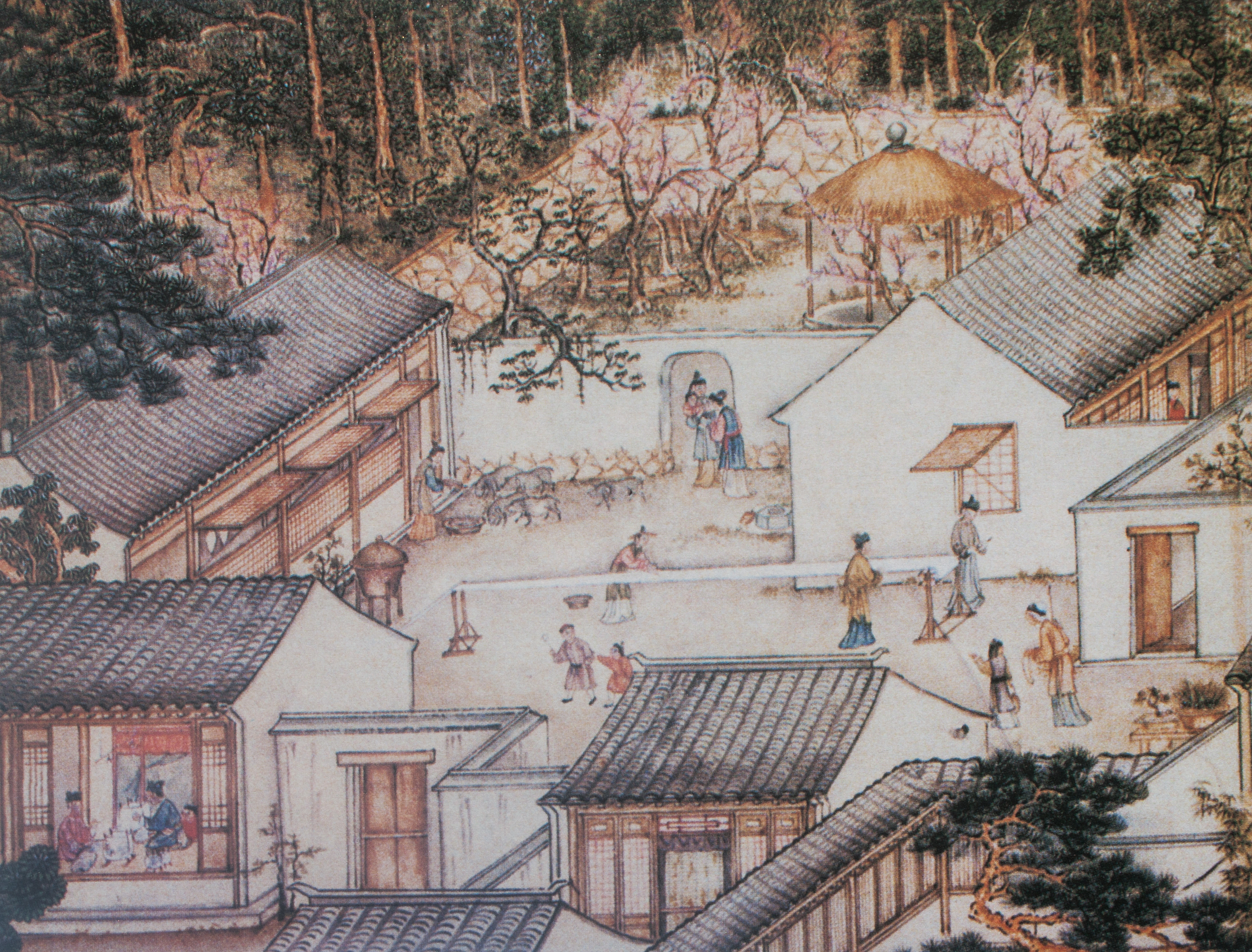
Village women at work

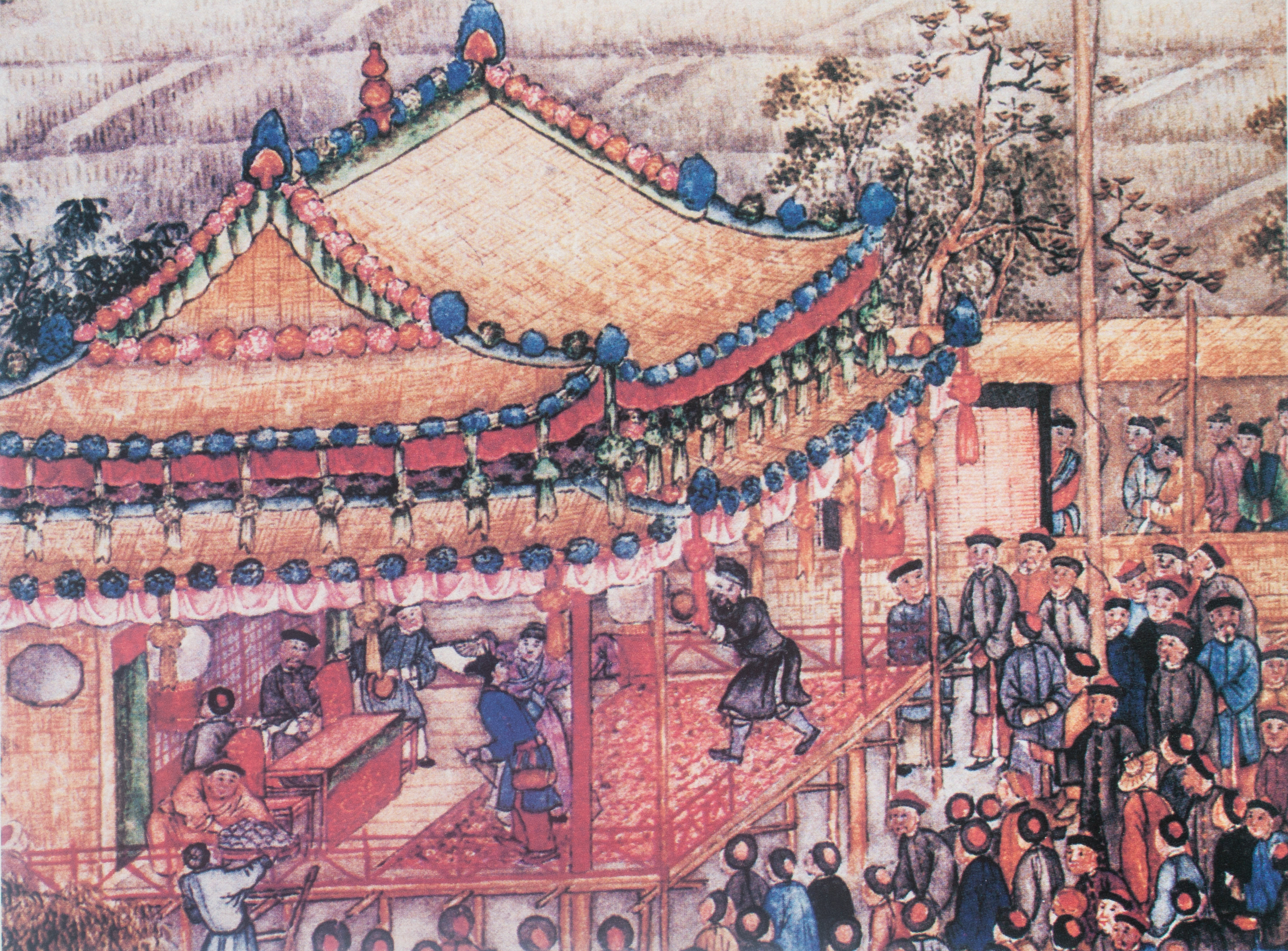
Theater

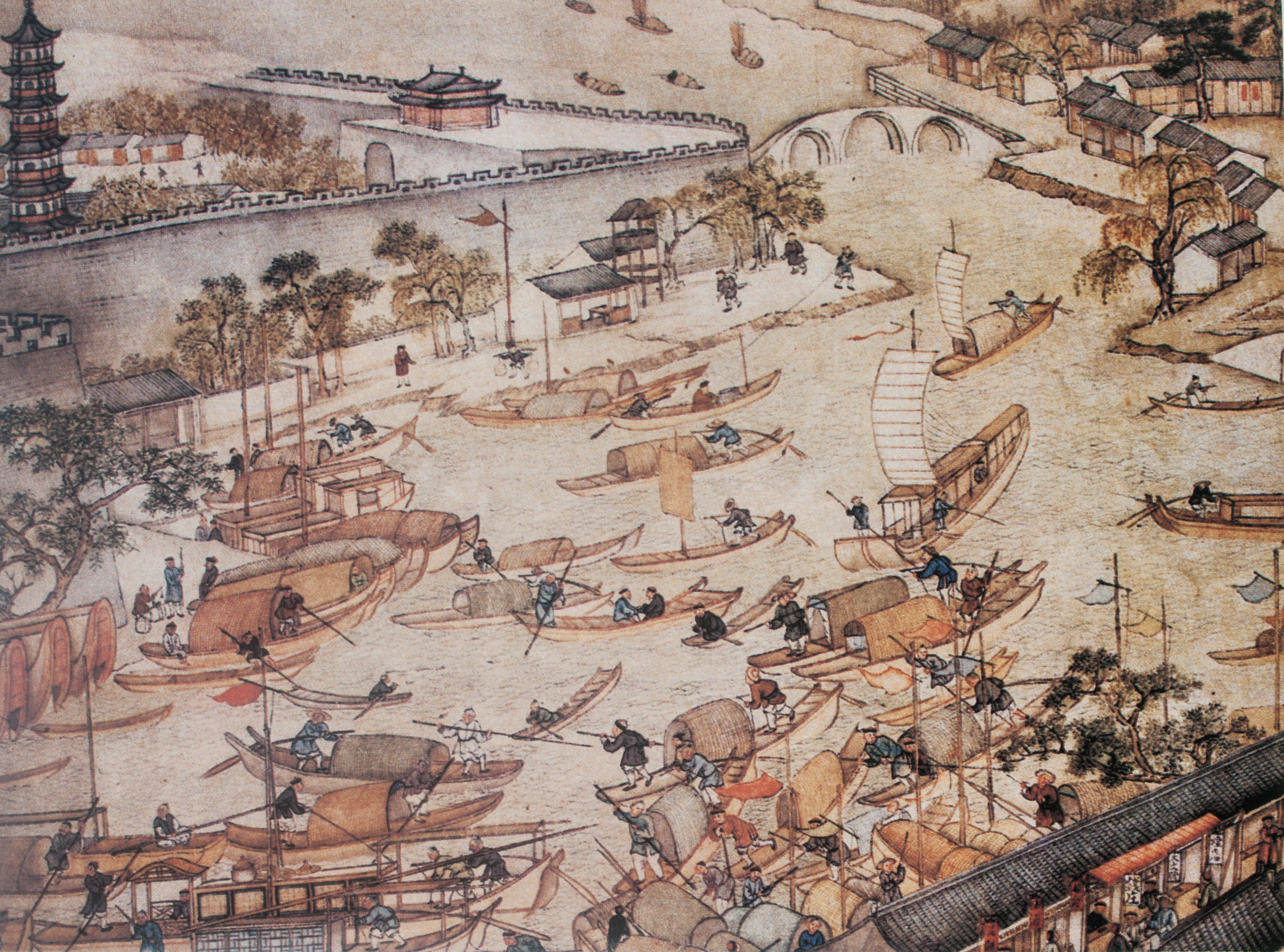
Commerce on the water

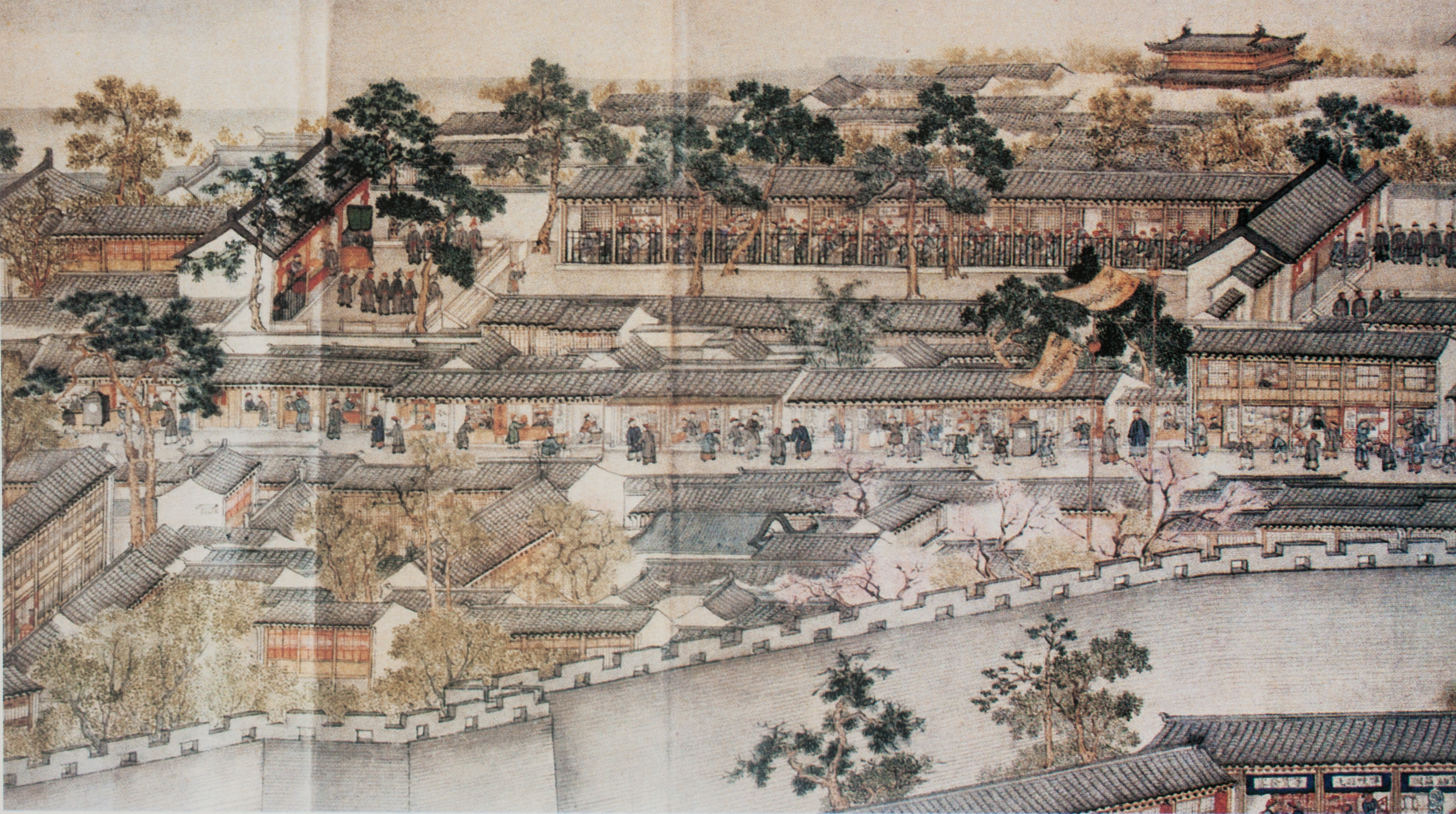
Examination hall

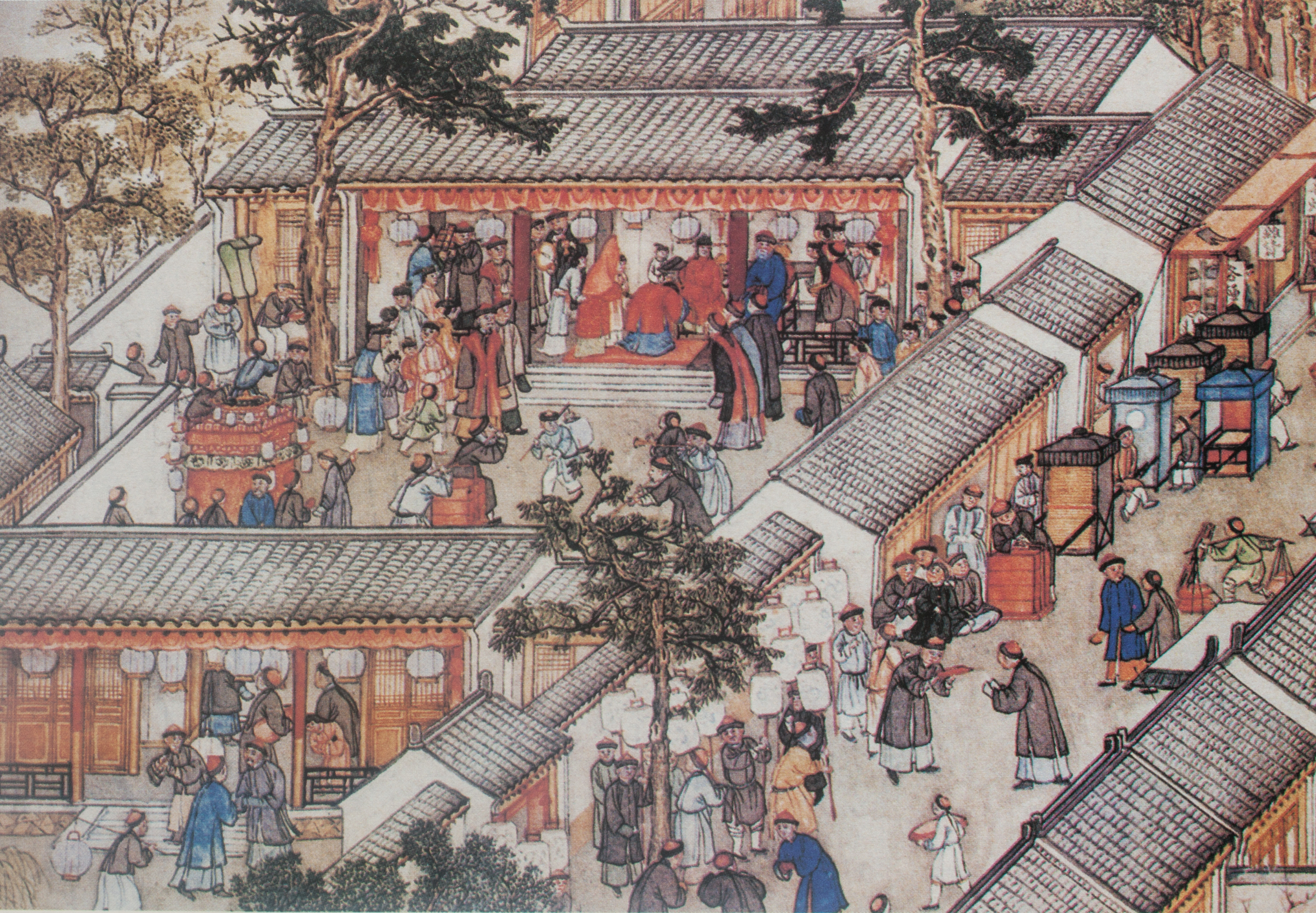
Marriage ceremony

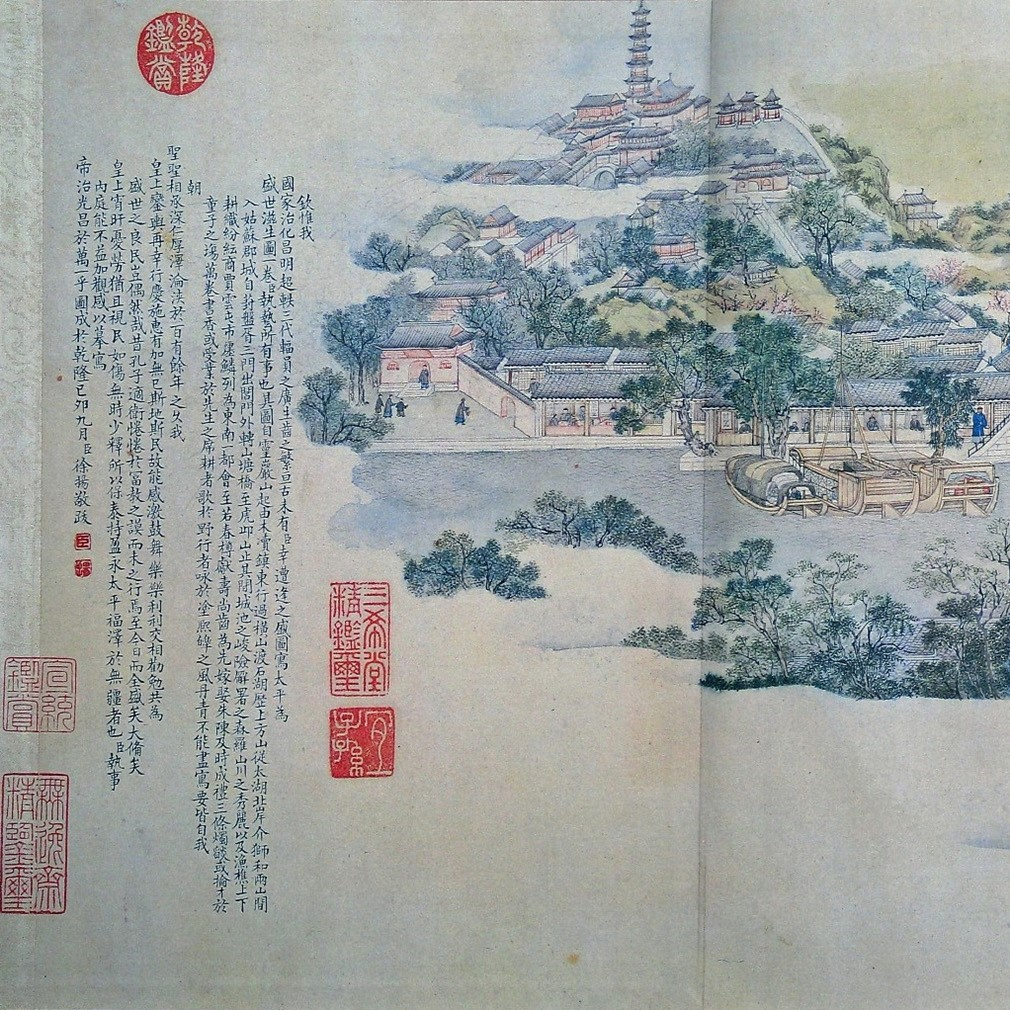
Tiger Hill and Xu Yang's inscription

== Exhibitions ==
Prosperous Suzhou along with fourteen other paintings (all on the subject of the prosperous cities of the Ming dynasty and Qing dynasty) from the Liaoning Provincial Museum were exhibited at the Hong Kong Museum of Art from 25 September 2009 to 22 November 2009 to celebrate the 60th anniversary of the founding of the People's Republic of China.

The Victoria and Albert Museum in London mounted an exhibition entitled Masterpieces of Chinese Painting that included Prosperous Suzhou from 26 October 2013 to 19 January 2014. The exhibition was organized to display the finest examples of Chinese painting from the beginning of the 8th to the end of the 19th century.

In 2016, a booklet by Michael Nicoll-Griffith was published entitled "Prosperous Suzhou" which displays a painted copy of Xu Yang's original. The booklet includes an explanation in English of pictorial descriptions in each half-metre of the painting.

== See also ==
- Chinese painting
- Along the River During the Qingming Festival
